= Cessna 340 =

Twin piston engine pressurized general aviation airplane

Cessna 335/340
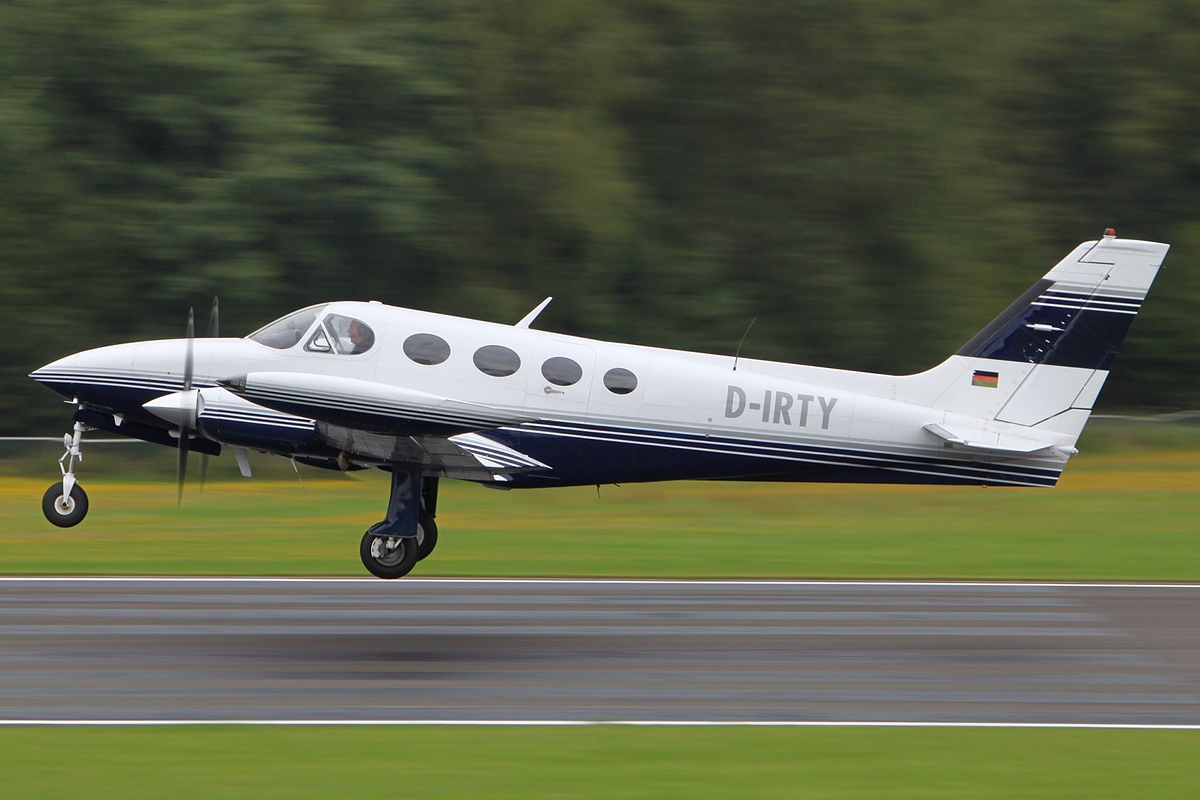
- Cessna 340A

General information
- Type: Light twin aircraft
- Manufacturer: Cessna
- Number built: 1,351

History
- Manufactured: 1971 (prototype) 1972–1984 (production)
- Introduction date: 1972
- First flight: 1970
- Developed from: Cessna 310

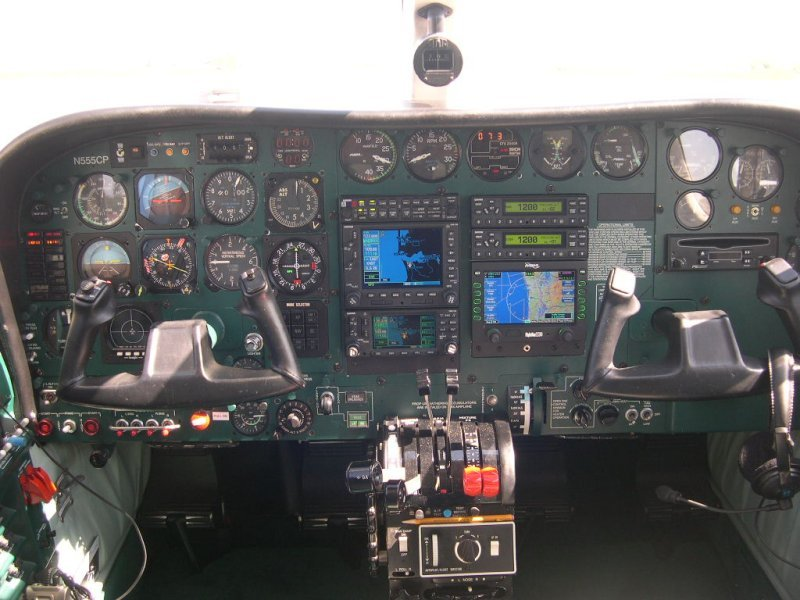
Instrument panel

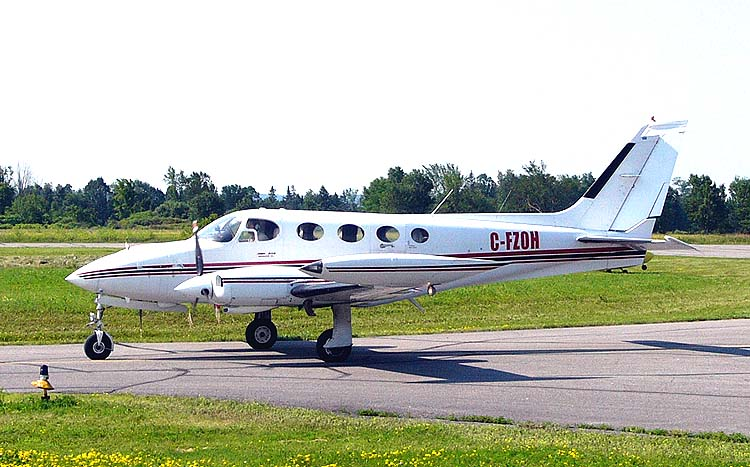
1973 model Cessna 340

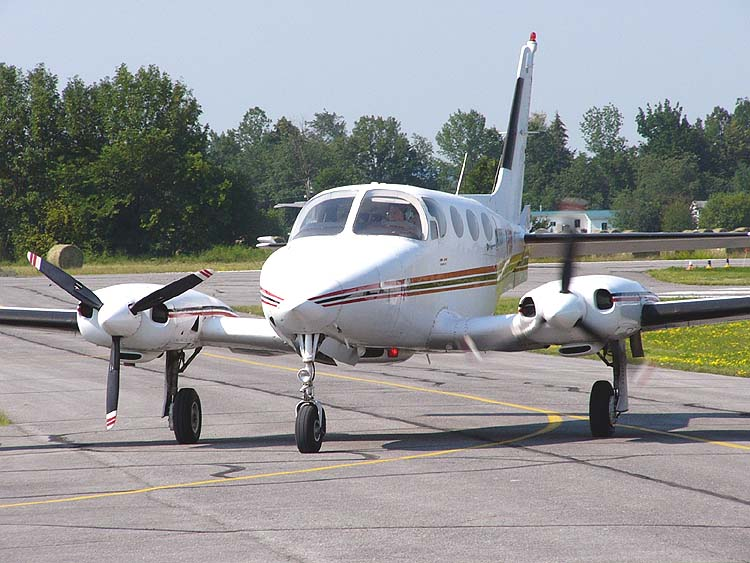
1973 model Cessna 340 front view

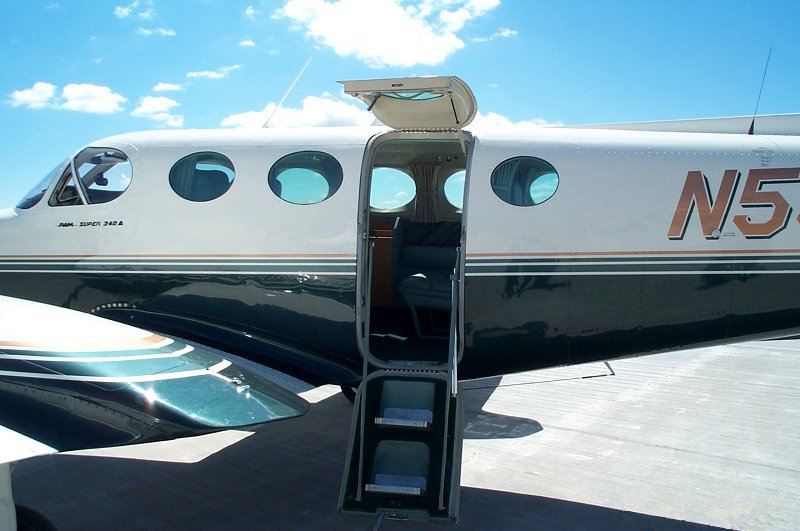
Airstair door

The Cessna 340 is a twin piston engine pressurized business aircraft that was manufactured by Cessna.

The Cessna 335 is an unpressurized version, which appears the same externally as the 340. It sold in smaller numbers than the 340.

== Design and development ==
The 340 was conceived as a cabin-class development of the successful Cessna 310.

The 340 is a six-seat aircraft, with four passenger seats, an aisle and an airstair door. The tail and landing gear were based on the Cessna 310's units, while its wings were from the Cessna 414. The 340's primary selling feature was its spacious, pressurized cabin, the first in a light twin.

Work on the 340 began in 1969, and the first aircraft was delivered in 1971, behind schedule due to a prototype crashing during flight testing in 1970.

The early models have two turbocharged Continental TSIO-520-K engines with 285 hp (214 kW) each. Starting in 1976, the engines were upgraded to the more powerful Continental TSIO-520-NB engines of 310 hp (233 kW). This variant is known as the 340A and it also features smaller 75.5-inch (1,920 mm) diameter propellers to reduce noise and meet ICAO Annex 16 noise requirements.

The Cessna 335 was marketed as a low-priced, non-pressurized, version powered by 300 hp (225 kW) Continental TSIO-520-EB engines. The prototype 335 made its maiden flight on December 5, 1978, with the first production aircraft flying in 1979. It was not a market success, with only 64 built by the time production ended in 1980. The 340 was more successful and remained in production until 1984 with 1287 built.

== Variants ==
340
Pressurized six-seat twin powered by two Continental TSIO-520-K engines of 285 hp (213 kW) each. Certified 15 October 1971. 350 built.

340A
Pressurized six-seat twin powered by two Continental TSIO-520-NB engines of 310 hp (230 kW) each. Certified 19 November 1975 948 built.

335
Unpressurized six-seat twin powered by Continental TSIO-520-EB engines of 300 hp (220 kW) each. Certified 2 October 1979 65 built.

Riley Rocket 340
Conversion of Cessna 340 aircraft by fitting two 340 hp (250 kW)) Lycoming TIO-540-R engines. Also designated R340L.

Riley Super 340
Conversion of 1972–1975 Cessna 340 aircraft by fitting two 310 hp (230 kW) Continental TSIO-520-J/-N engines. Also known as R340 Super.

== Accidents and incidents ==
- On 20 June 1984, a Cessna 340A crashed after taking off from Lunken, killing the pilot and three passengers.
- October 16, 2000 – Governor of Missouri Mel Carnahan is among the three people killed when a Cessna 335 he is aboard reports instrument problems, then goes into a high-speed dive and crashes in a densely wooded area near Hillsboro, Missouri. Also killed is Carnahan's son, who was piloting the plane, and a campaign aide.
- On March 23, 2006, a Cessna 340 crashed while on approach to the Melbourne Orlando International Airport. The probable cause of the accident was found to be the pilot's failure to maintain adequate airspeed to avoid a stall during the final approach to land. All three occupants perished.
- On March 18, 2016, a twin-engine Cessna 340A crashed, killing both the ATP rated pilot and private rated co-pilot. The 340 and a Cessna 172M took off on Runways 4 and 36 respectively. These two runways intersect at their northern section. The 172 had already begun its ascent as the 340 started its takeoff roll. The 340 attempted to avoid a collision and entered a steep left-hand bank and impacted the ground inverted. The aircraft was destroyed in the post-crash fire. The two aircraft did not collide and the 172 flew to its home airport of Tampa Executive.
- On October 11, 2021, a twin-engine Cessna 340 crashed while approaching Montgomery-Gibbs. The crash occurred near the campus of Santana High School in Santee. The aircraft struck three houses, killing at least two people.
- On February 18, 2023, a Cessna 340 plane departing from Bicol International Airport en route to Manila crashed near the crater of Mayon Volcano. All four occupants were killed.

== Specifications (340A) ==
Data from Jane's All The World's Aircraft 1980–81

General characteristics

- Crew: one pilot
- Capacity: five passengers
- Length: 34 ft 4 in (10.46 m)
- Wingspan: 38 ft 1 in (11.61 m)
- Height: 12 ft 7 in (3.84 m)
- Wing area: 184 sq ft (17.1 m^{2})
- Aspect ratio: 7.2:1
- Airfoil: NACA 23018 (root) NACA 23009 (tip)
- Empty weight: 3,911 lb (1,774 kg)
- Max takeoff weight: 5,990 lb (2,717 kg)
- Fuel capacity: 203 US gal (169 imp gal; 770 L) (usable capacity)
- Powerplant: 2 × Continental TSIO-520-NB air-cooled flat-six engines, 310 hp (230 kW) each
- Propellers: 3-bladed McCauley constant-speed propeller, 6 ft 4 1/2 in (1.94 m) diameter

Performance

- Maximum speed: 244 kn (281 mph, 452 km/h) at 20,000 ft (6,100 m)
- Cruise speed: 172 kn (198 mph, 319 km/h) at 25,000 ft (7,600 m) (econ. cruise)
- Stall speed: 71 kn (82 mph, 131 km/h) (flaps down, power off) CAS
- Range: 1,405 nmi (1,617 mi, 2,602 km) at 10,000 ft (3,000 m) (econ. cruise)
- Service ceiling: 29,800 ft (9,100 m)
- Rate of climb: 1,650 ft/min (8.4 m/s) at sea level
- Takeoff run to 50 ft (15 m): 2,175 ft (663 m)
- Landing run from 50 ft (15 m): 1,850 ft (560 m)

== See also ==
Aircraft of comparable role, configuration, and era

- Beechcraft Duke
- Piper PA-31 Navajo
- Rockwell Aero Commander
