= Cessna 421 Golden Eagle =

Pressurized twin-engine general aviation aircraft

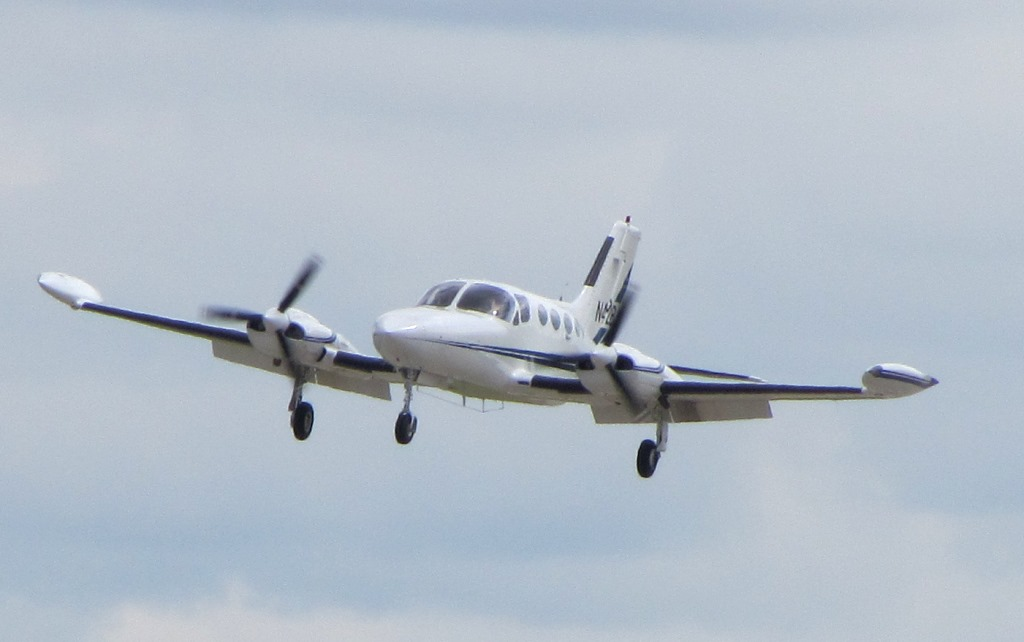
- Cessna 421B landing

General information
- Type: Light transport
- National origin: United States
- Manufacturer: Cessna
- Number built: 1,916

History
- Manufactured: 1967–1985
- Introduction date: 1968
- First flight: October 14, 1965
- Developed from: Cessna 411
- Developed into: Cessna 425

The Cessna 421 Golden Eagle is an American six or seven seat twin-engined light transport aircraft, developed in the 1960s by Cessna as a pressurized version of the earlier Cessna 411.

== Development ==
The Cessna 421 was first produced in May 1967, the 1968 model year. It had "Stabila-Tip" fuel tanks on the wingtips (like the Cessna 310). Its electro-mechanical landing gear are similar to that of the 310. It was an immediate hit, selling 200 planes in its first year.

The next year, 1969, the design was refined, with a three-inch stretch of the fuselage, five more gallons of fuel capacity, and a 40-pound increase in gross weight. The plane was redesignated the Cessna 421A.

In 1971, the design was again improved. Both empty and gross weight increased, the wingspan was increased by two feet, raising the service ceiling by 5,000 feet. The nose was stretched two feet to accommodate a larger nose baggage section. This new plane is designated the Cessna 421B.

In 1975, the plane was offered with a package of equipment enabling flight into known icing conditions.

In 1976, the 421C appeared which featured wet wings, the absence of wingtip fuel tanks and landing gear that was changed from straight-leg to a trailing-link design from the 1981 model year onwards. Production ended in 1985 after 1,901 aircraft had been delivered.

The 421 was first certified on 1 May 1967 and shares a common type certificate with models 401, 402, 411, 414 and 425.

Some 421s have been modified to accept turboprop engines, making them very similar to the Cessna 425, which itself is a turboprop development of the 421.

== Design ==
The 421 is an all-metal low-wing cabin monoplane with a retractable tricycle landing gear, and powered by two geared (Note: The gearing means that rather than the driveshaft being directly connected to the propeller, it drives through a set of reduction gears.) Continental GTSIO-520-D engines, wing-mounted in tractor configuration. The cabin is accessed from a door, on the left hand side behind the wing, and has seating for six on the basic 421, or up to ten on later variants.

== Variants ==
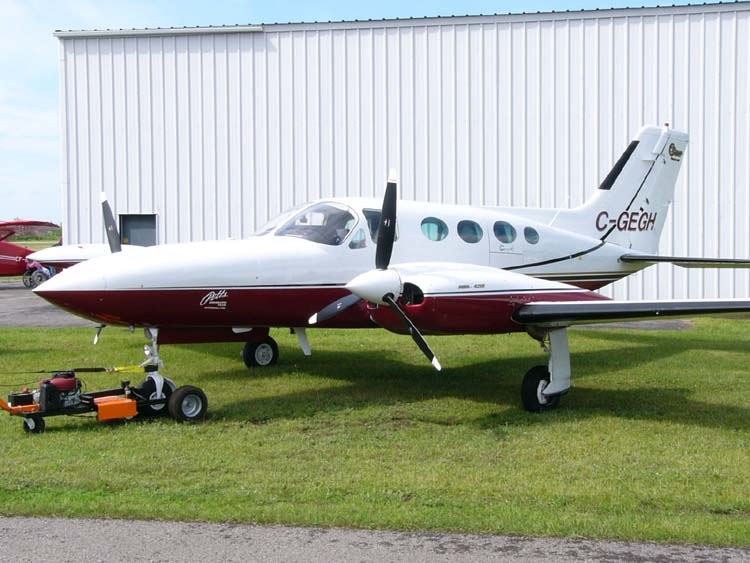
Cessna 421B Golden Eagle with aftermarket RAM-modified engines

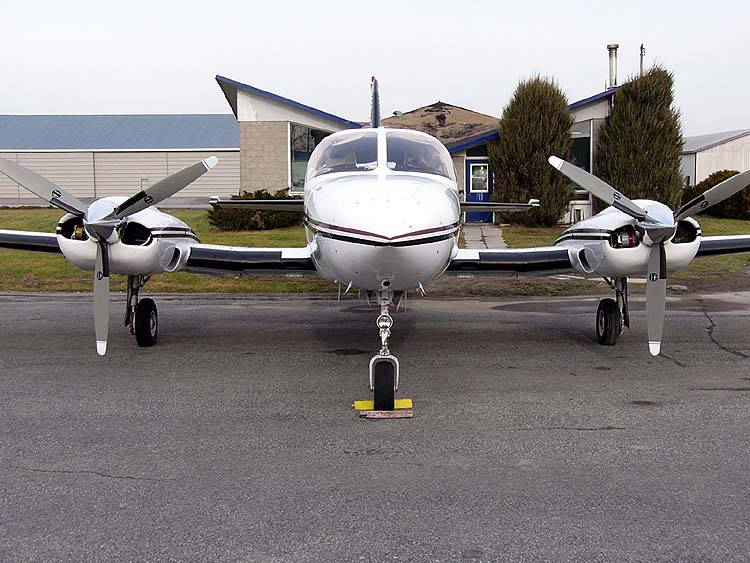
A Cessna 421B Golden Eagle, front view

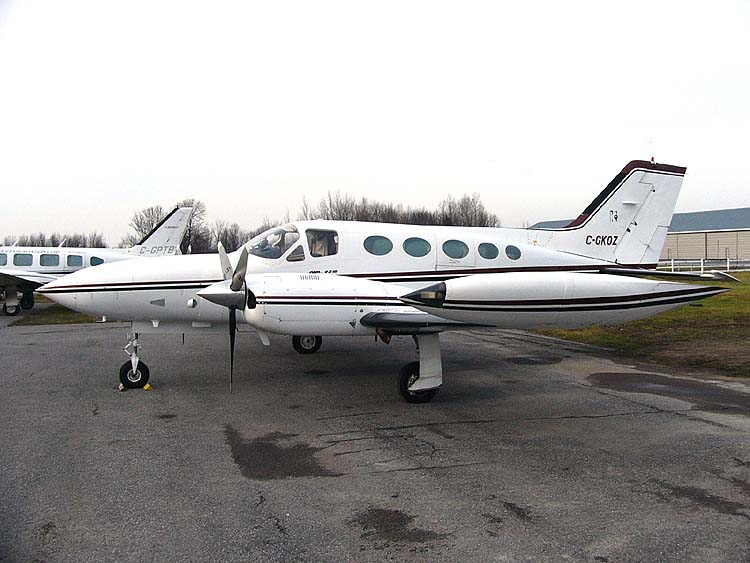
A Cessna 421B Golden Eagle

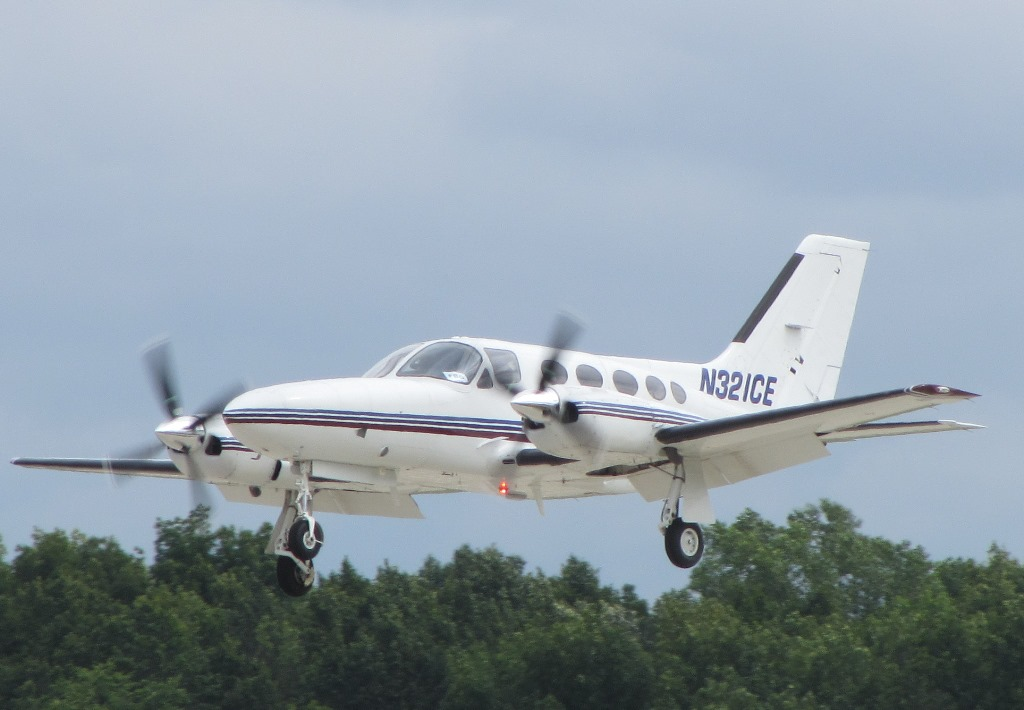
1982 Cessna 421C

421
Type approved 1 May 1967, powered by two Continental GTSIO-520-Ds of 375 hp (280 kW) each, maximum takeoff weight 6,800 lb (3,084 kg). 200 built.
421A
Type approved 19 November 1968, powered by two Continental GTSIO-520-Ds of 375 hp (280 kW) each, maximum takeoff weight 6,840 lb (3,103 kg). 158 built.
421B Golden Eagle/Executive Commuter
Eight-seat light passenger transport aircraft. Type approved 28 April 1970, powered by two Continental GTSIO-520-Hs of 375 hp (280 kW) each, maximum takeoff weight 7,250 lb (3,289 kg), later models 7,450 lb (3,379 kg). 699 built.
421C Golden Eagle/Executive Commuter
Model with new wing and landing gear. Type approved 28 October 1975, powered by two Continental GTSIO-520-Ls or Continental GTSIO-520-Ns of 375 hp (280 kW) each, maximum takeoff weight 7,450 lb (3,379 kg). 859 built.
Riley Turbine Rocket 421
Conversion of Cessna 421 aircraft by fitting two Lycoming LTP101 turboprop engines. Formal designation R421BL and R421CL for conversions of 421B and C respectively.
Riley Turbine Eagle 421
Conversion of Cessna 421C aircraft by fitting two 750hp Pratt & Whitney Canada PT6A-135 turboprop engines. Formal designation R421CP.
Excalibur 421
Re-engined 421C with Pratt & Whitney Canada PT6A-135A or PT6A-112 turboprops, supplemental type certificate held by Excalibur 421 LLC of Paso Robles, California. In 2013 it was announced that Aviation Alliance are acting as program managers for the Excalibur 421 upgrade programme.
Advanced Aircraft Regent 1500
Production of the Riley Turbine Eagle 421 conversion by Advanced Aircraft Corporation.

== Military operators ==
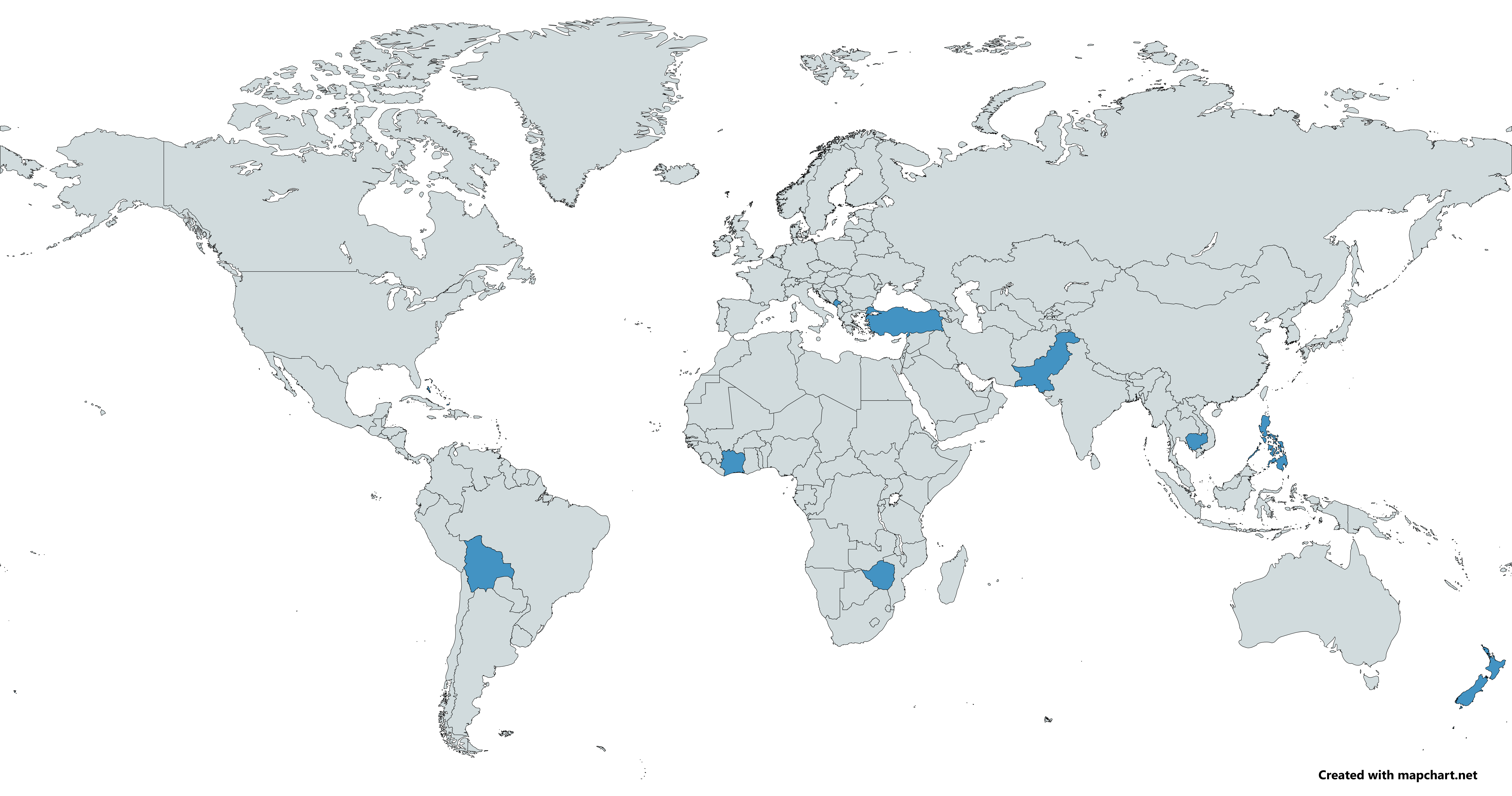
Map with nations whose militaries use the Golden Eagle

Bahamas

- Royal Bahamas Defence Force. Retired as of 2026.

Bolivia

- Bolivian Air Force at least one 421B was in use.
- Bolivian Army

Cambodia

- Royal Cambodian Air Force

Ivory Coast

- Ivory Coast Air Force

Montenegro

- Montenegrin Air Force

New Zealand

- Royal New Zealand Air Force three 421C.
  - No. 42 Squadron RNZAF

Pakistan

- Pakistan Army at least one 421 in use.

Philippines

- Philippine Army One unit 421B in service used for COMINT.

Turkey

- Turkish Army Aviation at least three 421Bs in use.

Zimbabwe

- Air Force of Zimbabwe at least one 421A in use.

== Accidents and incidents ==
- On December 16, 1972, a private Cessna 421 crashed into the homes at 116 and 121 Diane Drive in Cheektowaga near Buffalo Niagara International Airport. The crash killed three on board and three on the ground, and at least four people on the ground were injured.
- On 4 December 1980, a Cessna 421 carrying Prime Minister of Portugal Francisco de Sá Carneiro and other government officials, crashed into buildings in Camarate seconds after takeoff, killing all 7 persons on board.
- On 5 March 1984, the pilot and five passengers in a Cessna 421B, registration number N3291Q, were killed when the aircraft impacted trees 1 mile (1.6 km) northeast of Folsom Field, Alabama during an incorrectly executed nighttime instrument approach in IMC conditions. The NTSB attributed the accident to the pilot's failure to initiate a missed approach, his failure to maintain altitude, his lack of recent instrument flying experience, and his history of heart problems; contributing factors were poor visibility and adverse weather.
- On June 24, 1992, a Cessna 421 VGAB (tail number N628RJ), the 40-year-old pilot and two passengers took off from Monterey. About three minutes after takeoff the Cessna collided with a hill about three miles east of the airport. The investigation revealed that ground fog and overconfidence in the pilot caused the accident. All three were killed. The pilot had about 75 hours of flight experience.
- On December 15, 2003, award-winning American film and television music composer Steve Kaplan was killed when the propeller of the Cessna 421C Golden Eagle that he was piloting fractured due to metal fatigue shortly after takeoff and the plane crashed into a home in Claremont, California.
- On January 30, 2006, an eight-seat twin engine Cessna 421B with four passengers crashed about 1 mile (1,600 m) south of the airport. The aircraft was heading from Kansas to Palwaukee. There were no survivors.
- On June 4, 2006, a Cessna 421 Golden Eagle sustained substantial damage during a gear-up landing at Jacksonville Executive Airport. The pilot reported smelling smoke and feeling heat after departure; with nowhere straight ahead to land, he turned back to the airport. Because he thought the engine was on fire, the pilot landed gear-up in the dirt between the taxiway and runway. The cause of the smoke could not be determined.
- On April 17, 2009, a Cessna 421 crashed shortly after take-off from Fort Lauderdale Executive Airport around 11:20 a.m. Local authorities stated the aircraft crashed into a vacant home located about two miles (3.2 km) from the airport. The aircraft was en route to Fernandina Beach, Florida near Jacksonville and was due to arrive at 13:00. The Federal Aviation Administration indicated that one person was on board the aircraft, and was killed in the accident. Sebring Air Charter of Tamarac, Florida was listed on FAA records as the owner of the aircraft. The probable cause of the accident was determined to be pilot error, with an inflight fire of the right engine as a contributing factor.
- On December 9, 2011, a Cessna 421C aircraft crashed shortly after takeoff less than a mile from the airport into an open field. All 4 passengers on board were killed when the aircraft burst into flames upon crashing.
- On August 27, 2013, a Cessna 421C crashed just after takeoff. The aircraft had engine issues on takeoff and impacted a tree a mile after takeoff. Witnesses reported that the aircraft's takeoff run appeared slower than normal, and the aircraft was found to have used the entire runway and traveled through two different 300-foot fields.
- On November 22, 2017, the left-hand engine of a Cessna 421, registration N421RX, caught fire soon after takeoff from Presque Isle; the pilot attempted to return to the airport but was unable to maintain altitude and performed a forced landing in an adjacent field. Two persons aboard the aircraft suffered minor injuries and two others were uninjured; the aircraft was badly damaged. The NTSB attributed the accident to a fuel leak onto the hot turbocharger.
- On July 13, 2021, at around 10:42 am, a Cessna 421C (tail number N678SW), piloted by Mary Ellen Carlin crashed into a suburban residential area killing the pilot, passenger and a pet. Investigators found that the Cessna 421C diverged from its flight plan, resulting in a crash less than five minutes after departure.
- On May 6, 2022, Cessna 421C Golden Eagle, XB-FQS, lost power in both engines shortly after takeoff. The plane made a forced landing in a residential neighborhood near the airport, skidding across a school's athletic field and coming to rest in the backyards of nearby homes. None of the four aircraft occupants were injured.
- On April 30, 2026, around 11:25pm in Wimberly Texas, a Cessna 421C crashed while carrying 5 passengers to a Pickleball tournament near Austin Texas. Officials claimed the plane went down near Round Rock Road in Hays County. The 5 passengers on board were Brooke Skypala, Glen Appling, Seren Wilson, Hayden Dillard, and Stacy Hedrick. Unfortunately, none survived and were announced deceased on arrival. The second aircraft that was coming with them made it safely to its destination.
- On June 19, 2026, a Cessna 421 crashed near the La Baule airfield (Loire-Atlantique) in France. Both people on board died, including one of the founding brothers of the video game group Ubisoft, Claude Guillemot.

== Specifications (421C) ==
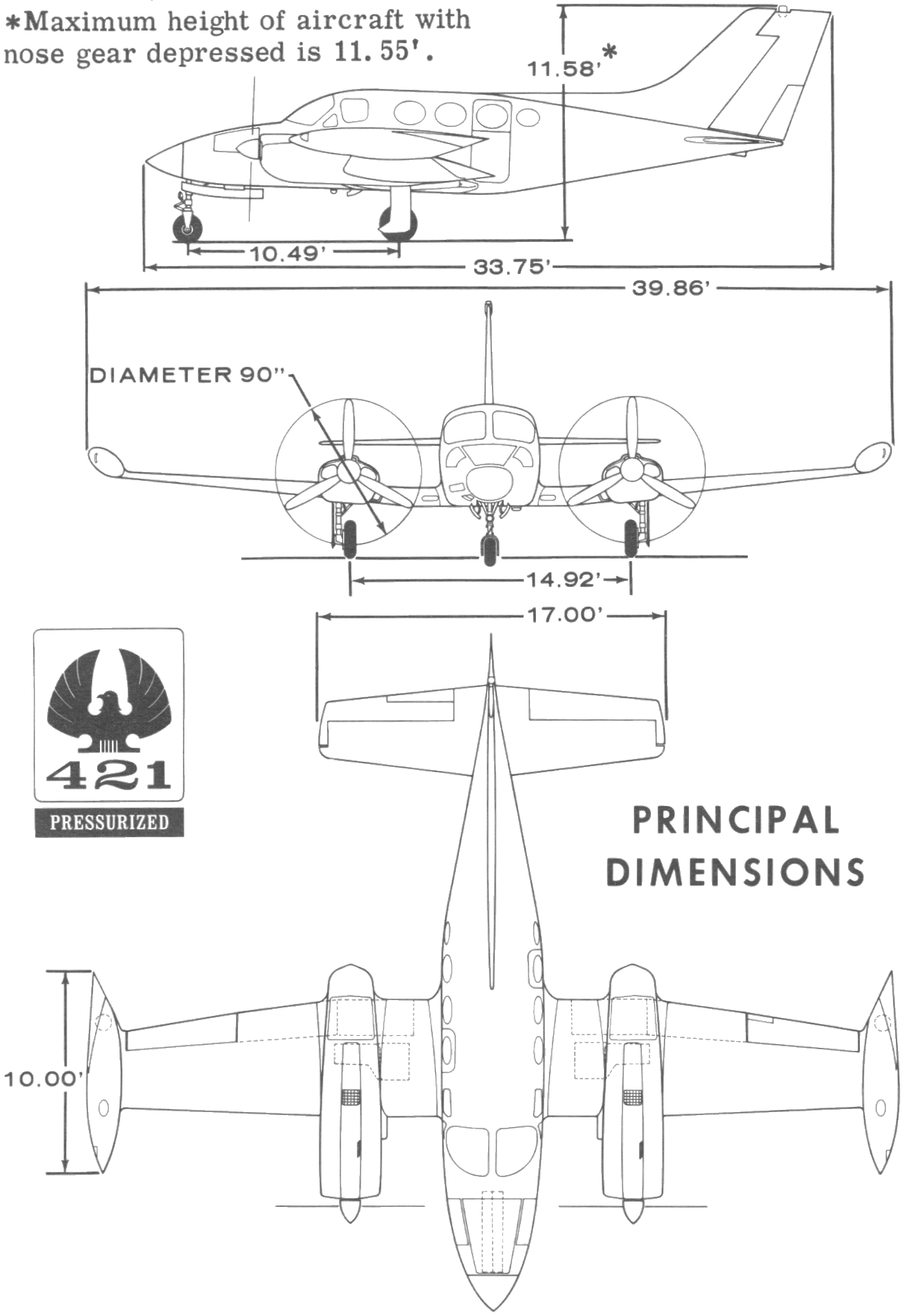
3-view line drawing of the Cessna 421

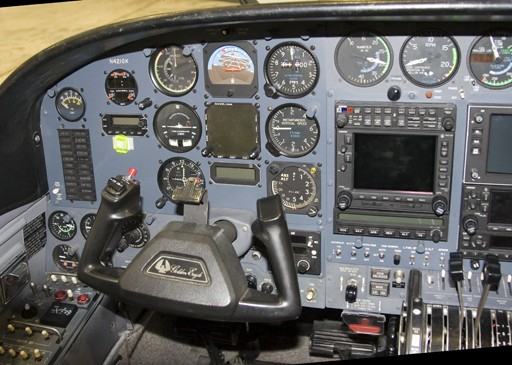
Cessna 421C Golden Eagle, typical pilot's instrumentation

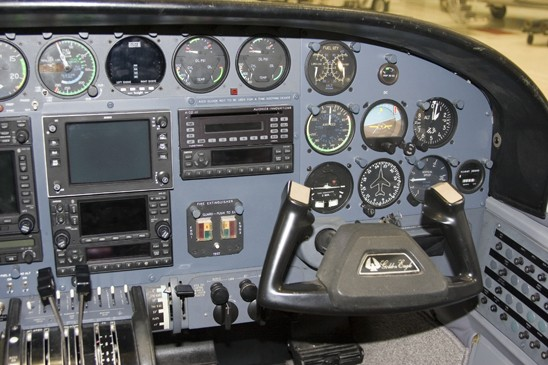
Cessna 421C Golden Eagle, typical copilot's instrumentation

Data from Jane's All The World's Aircraft 1976–77

General characteristics

- Crew: One or two
- Capacity: Six passengers
- Length: 36 ft 4 5/8 in (11.09 m)
- Wingspan: 41 ft 1 1/2 in (12.53 m)
- Height: 11 ft 5 3/8 in (3.49 m)
- Wing area: 215 sq ft (20.0 m^{2})
- Empty weight: 4,501 lb (2,042 kg)
- Max takeoff weight: 7,450 lb (3,379 kg)
- Fuel capacity: 206 US gal (172 imp gal; 780 L) normal (usable capacity), 262 US gal (218 imp gal; 990 L) with optional wing tanks
- Powerplant: 2 × Continental GTSIO-520-L turbocharged, fuel injected and geared flat-six engines, 375 hp (280 kW) each
- Propellers: 3-bladed McCauley constant-speed propellers

Performance

- Maximum speed: 256 kn (295 mph, 474 km/h) at 20,000 ft (6,100 m)
- Cruise speed: 240 kn (280 mph, 440 km/h) at 25,000 ft (7,600 m) (75% power)
- Range: 1,487 nmi (1,711 mi, 2,754 km) at 25,000 ft (7,600 m), econ cruise speed
- Service ceiling: 30,200 ft (9,200 m)
- Rate of climb: 1,940 ft/min (9.9 m/s)
- Takeoff distance to 50 ft (15m): 2,323 ft (708 m)
- Landing distance from 50 ft (15 m): 2,293 ft (699 m)

== See also ==
Related development

- Cessna 411 (unpressurized predecessor to 421)
- Cessna 401 (unpressurized, smaller-engine predecessor)
- Cessna 402 (unpressurized, smaller-engine predecessor)
- Cessna 414 (smaller-engine variant of 421)
- Cessna 425 (turboprop variant of 421)

Aircraft of comparable role, configuration, and era

- Aero Commander 600/700-series
- Beechcraft Duke
- Beechcraft Queen Air
- Piper PA-31 Navajo
- Aero Commander 690-series
- Piper Cheyenne
