= Hume Award =

Hume Award may refer to:

- David M. Hume Memorial Award, awarded annually by the National Kidney Foundation in the United States
- Fred J. Hume Award, awarded annually to the most "unsung hero" player of the Vancouver Canucks of the National Hockey League, as voted by fans
- Sandy Hume Memorial Award for Excellence in Political Journalism, awarded annually by the National Press Club in the United States

== See also ==
- William Hume-Rothery Award
