= Viper Aircraft Viperfan =

American homebuilt aircraft

Viperfan

General information
- Type: Homebuilt aircraft
- National origin: United States
- Manufacturer: Viper Aircraft
- Status: Production completed
- Number built: one

History
- Introduction date: late 1990s
- Variant: Viper Aircraft ViperJet

The Viper Aircraft Viperfan was an American homebuilt aircraft that was designed and produced by Viper Aircraft of Kennewick, Washington, introduced in the late 1990s. It was intended to be supplied as a kit for amateur construction, but only one was ever built.

== Design and development ==
The Viperfan was designed to resemble a military jet trainer, but powered by a pusher piston engine. It featured a cantilever low-wing, a two-seats-in-tandem enclosed cockpit under a bubble canopy, retractable tricycle landing gear and a single engine in pusher configuration.

The aircraft was made from composite materials. Its 24.5 ft (7.5 m) span wing-mounted flaps and had a wing area of 85.0 sq ft (7.90 m^{2}). The cabin width was 31 in (79 cm). The acceptable power range was 240 to 350 hp (179 to 261 kW) and the standard engines envisioned to be used were the 285 to 310 hp (213 to 231 kW) Continental IO-520 and TSIO-520, or the 350 hp (261 kW) Continental TSIOL-550 powerplant, driving the tail-mounted propeller through an extension shaft.

The Viperfan had a typical empty weight of 1,450 lb (660 kg) and a gross weight of 2,500 lb (1,100 kg), giving a useful load of 1,050 lb (480 kg). With full fuel of 100 U.S. gallons (380 L; 83 imp gal) the payload for the pilot, passenger and baggage was 450 lb (200 kg). The aircraft was fully aerobatic and stressed to +/-6g.

The standard day, sea level, no wind, take off with a 350 hp (261 kW) engine was 1,000 ft (305 m) and the landing roll was 1,600 ft (488 m).

The manufacturer estimated the construction time from the planned kit to be 2000 hours.

The aircraft was not a success due to problems with vibrations in the engine-to-propeller extension shaft and so the aircraft was converted to turbojet power. Eventually it was completely redesigned to become the Viper Aircraft ViperJet MKII.

== Operational history ==
By 1998 the company reported that one aircraft had been completed and was flying.

In May 2015 no examples were registered in the United States with the Federal Aviation Administration and it is unlikely any exist anymore.

== Specifications (Viperfan) ==
Data from AeroCrafter

General characteristics

- Crew: one
- Capacity: one passenger
- Length: 26 ft 6 in (8.08 m)
- Wingspan: 24 ft 6 in (7.47 m)
- Wing area: 85.0 sq ft (7.90 m^{2})
- Aspect ratio: 8.2:1
- Empty weight: 1,450 lb (658 kg)
- Gross weight: 2,500 lb (1,134 kg)
- Fuel capacity: 100 U.S. gallons (380 L; 83 imp gal)
- Powerplant: 1 × Continental TSIOL-550 six cylinder, liquid-cooled, four stroke aircraft engine, 350 hp (260 kW)
- Propellers: 3-bladed constant speed propeller

Performance

- Maximum speed: 500 mph (800 km/h, 430 kn)
- Cruise speed: 400 mph (640 km/h, 350 kn)
- Stall speed: 66 mph (106 km/h, 57 kn) in landing configuration
- Range: 1,500 mi (2,400 km, 1,300 nmi)
- Service ceiling: 31,000 ft (9,400 m)
- g limits: +/-6
- Rate of climb: 4,000 ft/min (20 m/s)
- Wing loading: 29.4 lb/sq ft (144 kg/m^{2})

== See also ==
- List of aerobatic aircraft
