= Viper Aircraft ViperJet =

American homebuilt sport aircraft

ViperJet

General information
- Type: High performance sport and aerobatic
- National origin: United States
- Manufacturer: Viper Aircraft
- Designer: Scott Hanchette

History
- First flight: October 1999
- Developed from: Viper Aircraft Viperfan

The Viper Aircraft ViperJet is a small homebuilt jet aircraft by Viper Aircraft Corporation. It is a conventional, low-wing monoplane with swept wings and tail and two seats in tandem under a bubble canopy. The jet intakes are located at the sides of the fuselage and the tricycle undercarriage is retractable. Construction throughout is of composite materials.

== Development ==
Originally conceived to use a piston engine driving a five- or six-blade pusher propeller, brothers Scott and Dan Hanchette commenced work on the prototype, then known as the ViperFan, in February 1996. However, concerns about the difficulty and cost associated with eliminating vibration from the drivetrain led the Hanchettes to choose turbojet propulsion instead, and they installed a Turbomeca Marboré engine in place of the Continental flat-6 they had originally envisaged as a powerplant.

The Viperjet prototype flew late in October 1999. and made its public debut at EAA AirVenture Oshkosh in 2000. The Hanchette brothers, however, were unhappy with both the low power and the high fuel consumption of the Turbomeca engine, and soon swapped it for a General Electric T58 turboshaft engine with the power turbine removed, turning it into a turbojet. While this worked, it still did not produce as much thrust as the Hanchettes hoped for, and eventually, they selected the General Electric J85. With this engine producing around four times the thrust of the previous powerplants tested in the Viper, the Hanchettes substantially redesigned the aircraft, dubbing the J85-powered version the MKII. The prototype was dismantled and rebuilt, with parts of the canopy and fuselage center section all that remained of the original design. The slightly larger MKII also features a pressurized cabin, nearly three times the fuel tankage, stronger undercarriage, and optional tip tanks. The MKII prototype flew on 12 June 2005 and Viper Aircraft offered replacement MKII parts to all customers who had purchased kits of the original version, now dubbed the MKI.

In 2006, the base MKII kit cost US$182,000, but since builders can purchase additional components already pre-made by Viper Aircraft, customers spent an average of $350,000 on their kits. They would then have to spend approximately another $300,000 and around 3,000 to 3,500 hours to complete the aircraft. The company also offers customers a builder assistance program to help them assemble the major airframe components and a training program to help them learn to fly their ViperJet once it is complete. Zero Gravity Builders provides builder assistance for the ViperJet MKII, ViperJet LXR and Viper FanJet. Viper Aircraft had sold 21 kits by September 2006.

In 2008, Viper Aircraft announced an enlarged, turbofan-powered follow-on design as the Viper Aircraft FanJet. The company has also proposed a military trainer version of the ViperJet, as well as a UAV version.

== Operational history ==
By April 2020 seven examples had been registered in the United States with the Federal Aviation Administration.

== Specifications (MKII, preliminary specifications) ==
Data from White 2006, p.13

General characteristics

- Crew: One pilot
- Capacity: 2 (1 pilot & 1 passenger)
- Length: 25 ft 6 in (7.80 m)
- Wingspan: 27 ft 10 in (8.48 m)
- Empty weight: 3,200 lb (1,452 kg)
- Gross weight: 5,100 lb (2,320 kg)
- Powerplant: 1 × General Electric CJ-610 , 2,850 lbf (12.7 kN) thrust

Performance

- Maximum speed: 500–525 mph (804–845 km/h, 434–456 kn)
- Cruise speed: 375 mph (603 km/h, 326 kn)
- Stall speed: 80 mph (130 km/h, 70 kn)
- Range: 920 mi (1,480 km, 800 nmi)
- Service ceiling: 35,000 ft (10,500 m)
- Rate of climb: 12,000 ft/min (61 m/s)

== See also ==
Related lists

- List of very light jets
