= Rockwell 685 =

Aero Commander 685 / Rockwell 685
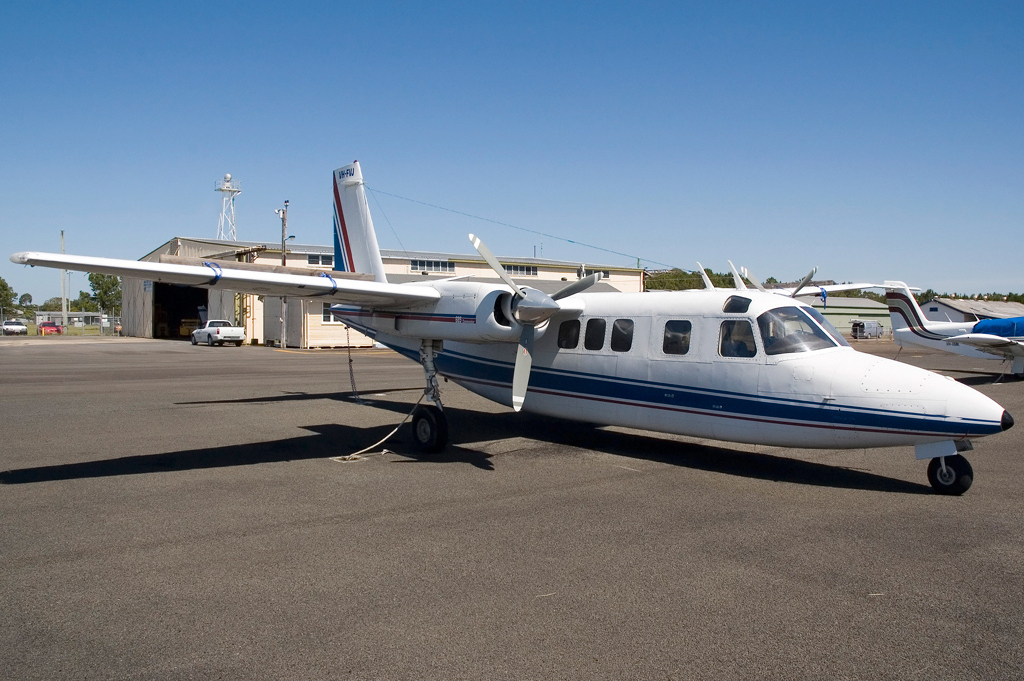
- Rockwell Commander 685

General information
- Type: Business aircraft
- National origin: United States
- Manufacturer: Aero Commander/Rockwell International

History
- First flight: 1971
- Developed from: Rockwell Commander 690

The Rockwell Commander 685 or Aero Commander 685 is a light-twin piston-engined aircraft with a pressurized cabin originally built by the Aero Commander company, a division of Rockwell International from 1965.

The predecessor model was the Aero Commander 690 and the next generation are Aero Commander JetProp series. The Aero Commander 685 had the ICAO aircraft code AC6L The introduction was in 1971 and the retired in 1976; in this time are built 66 aircraft.

== Design and development ==
The Commander 685 was a piston-engined variant of the turboprop-powered Rockwell Commander 690, with two wing-mounted 435 hp Continental GTSIO-520K piston engines in tractor configuration with three-bladed Hartzell feathering propellers. It is a high-wing cantilever monoplane with an enclosed nine-seat cabin and a retractable nose-wheel landing gear. The Model 685 was type certified by the Federal Aviation Administration on 17 September 1971.

== Specifications ==
Data from Jane's All the Worlds Aircraft 1976–77

General characteristics

- Crew: 1–2
- Capacity: 7–8 passengers
- Length: 42 ft 11 3/4 in (13.10 m)
- Wingspan: 46 ft 6.6 in (14.19 m)
- Height: 14 ft 11 1/2 in (4.56 m)
- Wing area: 266 sq ft (24.7 m^{2})
- Empty weight: 6,021 lb (2,731 kg)
- Max takeoff weight: 9,000 lb (4,082 kg)
- Fuel capacity: 256 US gal (213 imp gal; 970 L) standard, 322 US gal (268 imp gal; 1,220 L) with auxiliary tanks
- Powerplant: 2 × Continental GTSIO-520-F air-cooled flat-six, 435 hp (324 kW) each
- Propellers: 3-bladed Hartzell, 7 ft 4 in (2.24 m) diameter

Performance

- Maximum speed: 279 mph (449 km/h, 242 kn) at 20,000 ft (6,100 m) (TAS)
- Cruise speed: 255 mph (411 km/h, 222 kn) at 24,000 ft (7,300 m), (max cruise) (TAS)
- Stall speed: 86 mph (139 km/h, 75 kn) (wheels and flaps down), (CAS)
- Range: 1,920 mi (3,090 km, 1,670 nmi) (econ cruise at 20,000 ft (6,100 m), no reserves)
- Service ceiling: 27,500 ft (8,400 m)
- Rate of climb: 1,490 ft/min (7.6 m/s)
