= Cessna 414 =

Pressurized twin-engine general aviation aircraft

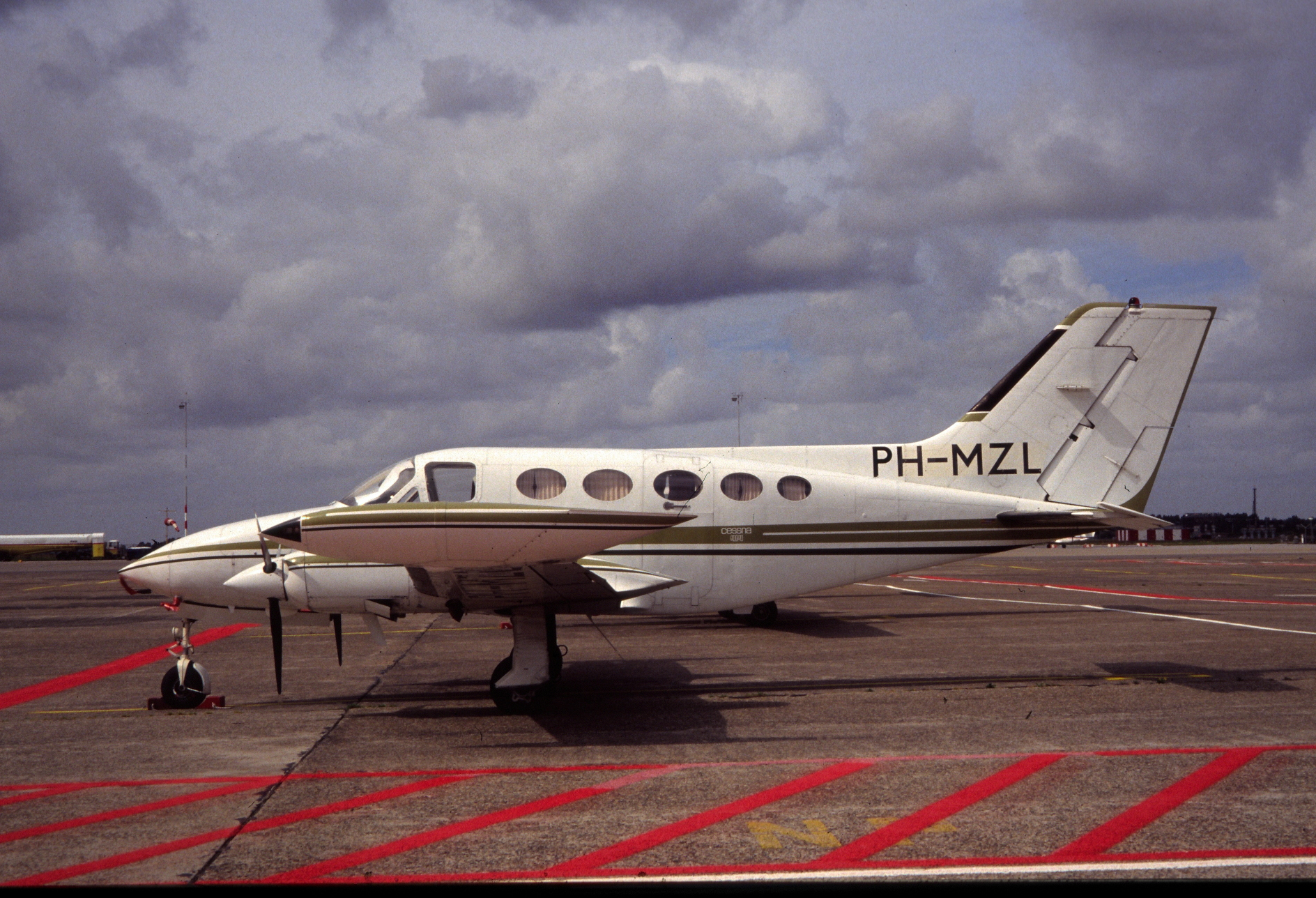
- Cessna 414

General information
- Type: Six/eight-seat light transport
- National origin: United States
- Manufacturer: Cessna
- Number built: 1,070

History
- Manufactured: 1968–1985
- First flight: November 1, 1968
- Developed from: Cessna 401
- Developed into: Cessna 340

The Cessna 414 is an American light, pressurized, twin-engine transport aircraft built by Cessna. It first flew in 1968 and an improved variant was introduced from 1978 as the 414A Chancellor.

== Design and development ==
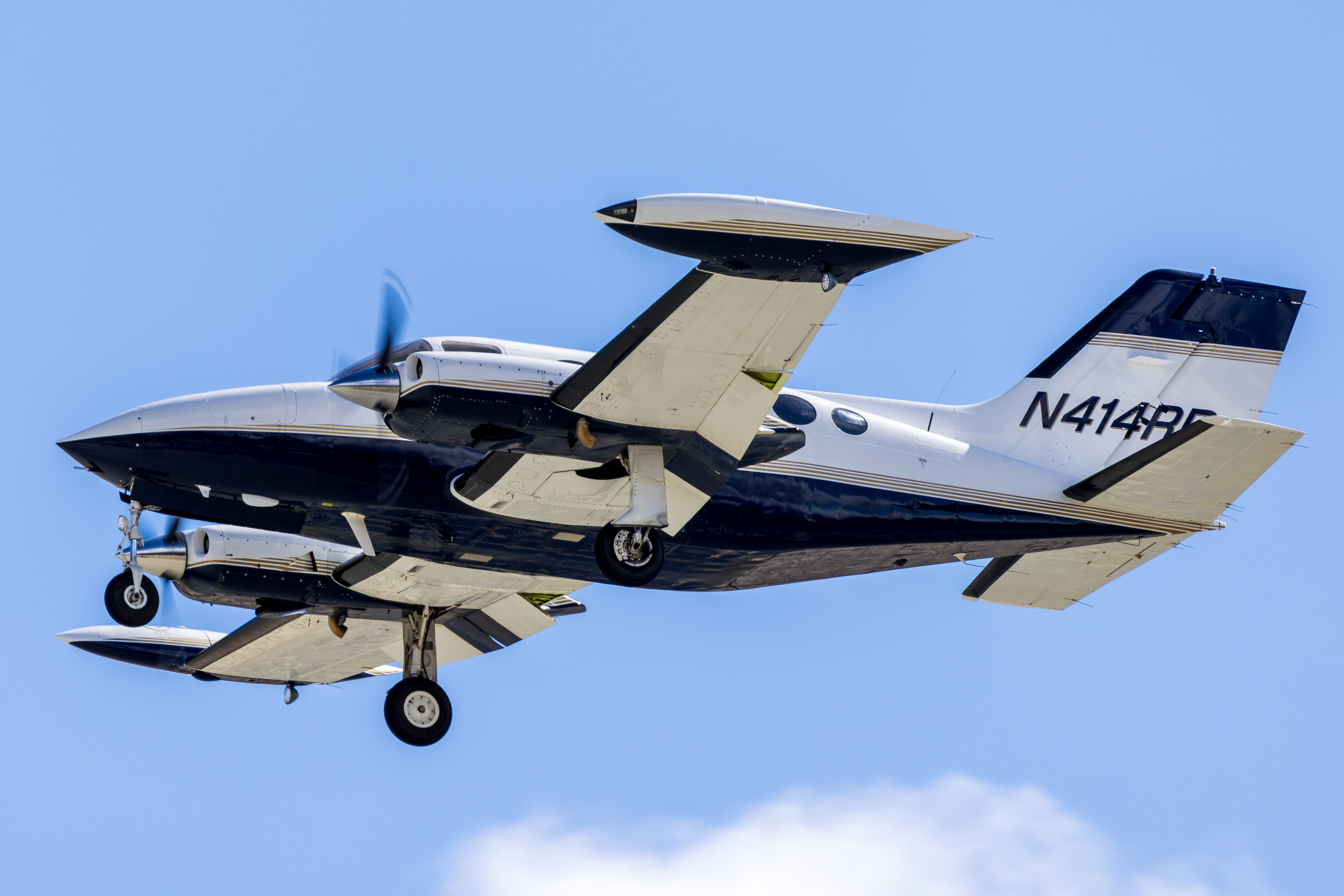
A Cessna 414 landing at Palm Springs International Airport, 2023

The pressurized 414 was developed to appeal to owners of unpressurized, twin-engined aircraft, and was based on the fuselage of the Cessna 421 and used the wing design of the Cessna 401. The 414 is a low-wing cantilever monoplane with a conventional tail unit and a retractable tricycle landing gear. It is powered by two wing-mounted 310 hp (231 kW) Continental TSIO-520-J horizontally opposed, six-cylinder engines. The prototype, registered N7170C, first flew on 1 November 1968, and production aircraft were available in a number of optional seating arrangements and avionics packages. The name Chancellor was used for models marketed from 1976. An improved variant the Cessna 414A Chancellor was introduced in 1978 with the major change being a redesigned and increased-span wing with integral fuel tanks and an extended nose to give more baggage space.

=== Modifications ===
Many supplemental type certificates exist for the aircraft that allow upgrades to improve performance. Common are engine and aerodynamic modifications, including winglets.

In 1974, American Jet Industries built a turboprop-powered conversion of the Cessna 414, named the Turbo Star Pressurized 414, using Allison 250-B17B engines. Scenic Airlines of Las Vegas purchased the rights to the design in 1977.

Thielert has offered engine conversions using their Centurion Engines. This involves the installation of FADEC-controlled aviation diesel piston engines that run on commonly available jet fuel. Thielert claims increased power and improved fuel economy over other available conventional piston engines.

== Variants ==
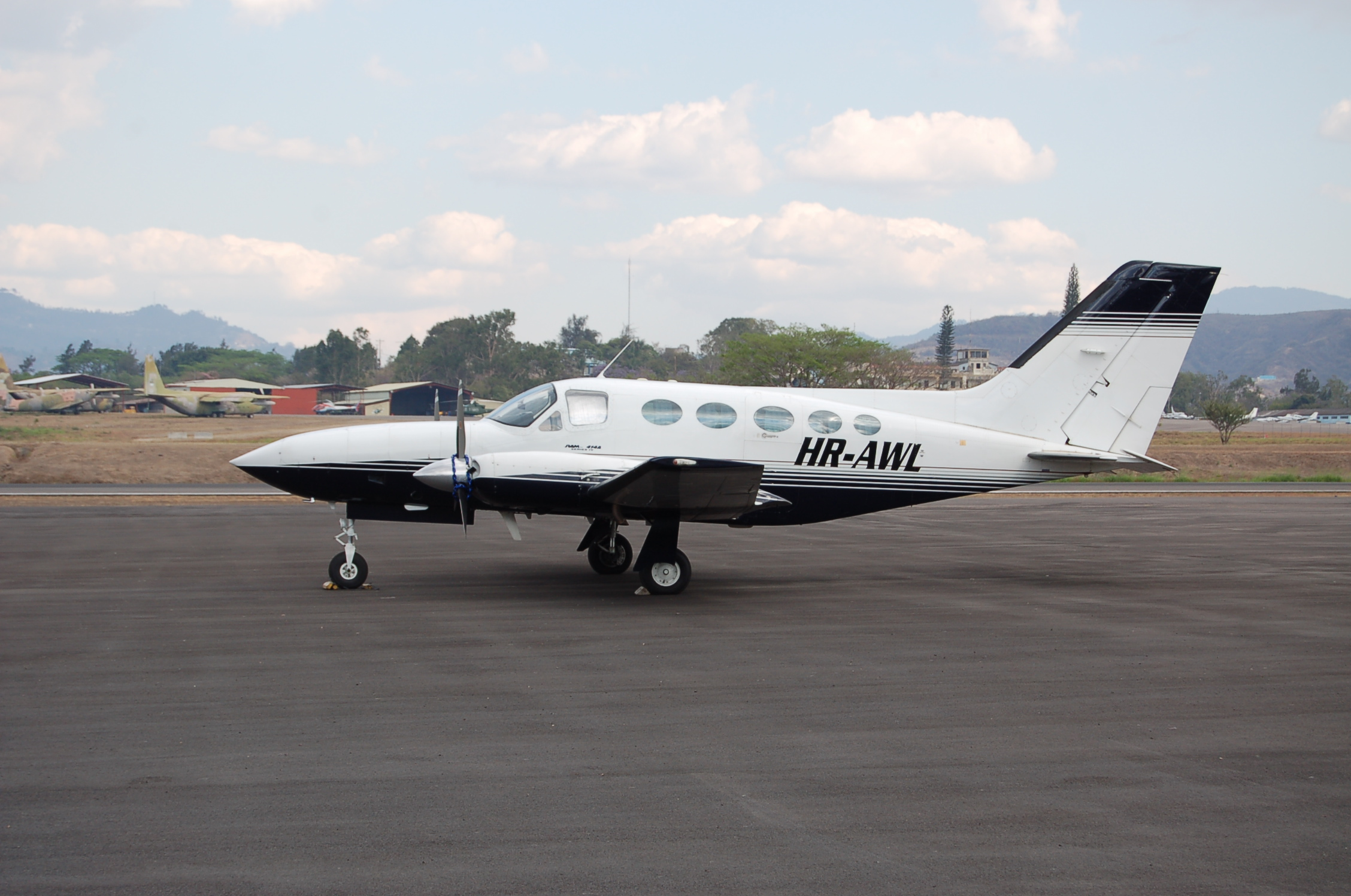
Cessna 414A Chancellor

414
Initial production variant, 516 built
414A Chancellor
Improved 414 with narrower vertical tail, longer span bonded wet wing without tip tanks, a lengthened nose, redesigned landing gear, and powered by two 310 hp (231kW) TSIO-520-N engines, 554 built.
Riley Rocket 414
Conversion of Cessna 414 aircraft by fitting two 400 hp Lycoming IO-720 engines

== Operators ==
=== Military operators ===
Bahamas
Lebanon
A Cessna 414 aircraft was donated to the Lebanese Army in 2015. In 2020, Lebanese Air Force donated the Cessna 414 to University of Balamand.

== Accidents and incidents ==
- The American Christian singer Keith Green and 11 other people were killed on July 28, 1982, in a Cessna 414 shortly after takeoff at the private Garden Valley Airport, near Garden Valley, Texas. The NTSB report indicates that the probable cause of the crash was a combination of the aircraft being overloaded (the occupants were four adults and eight children, while the aircraft has only seven seats) and pilot's failure to calculate weight and balance relative to the aircraft's design parameters.
- In March 2000 a Cessna 414 crashed on its way from Gaborone to Maun. The pilot and a passenger walked for over 200 kilometres (120 mi) to find help.
- On January 19, 2005, a Cessna 414 was substantially damaged during a hard landing at Akron-Canton Regional Airport. After departure from Akron Fulton Airport, the aircraft entered clouds and immediately picked up heavy ice, and the aircraft's deicing systems were activated, though they could not compete with the ice accumulation. The pilot attempted to land back at Fulton but could not because ice was clouding the front window and could not be removed. The pilot then proceeded to Akron-Canton for an Airport Surveillance Radar approach. When the pilot reduced power in the flare, the aircraft landed hard on all three landing gear wheels simultaneously. The probable cause of the incident was found to be the pilot's failure to obtain a complete weather briefing, which resulted in an inadequate weather decision, and flight into known icing conditions. A factor was the airplane not being equipped for flight in icing conditions.
- On March 8, 2006, a Hawaii Air Ambulance Cessna 414 was making an approach to Runway 5 when it crashed into a BMW dealership about a mile from Kahului Airport. A pilot and two paramedics were killed in the accident.
- On April 7, 2015, a Cessna 414A, registration number N789UP, substantially wandered from the correct flight path during an instrument approach to Runway 20 in low visibility and struck terrain in a nose-down attitude, killing the pilot and all six passengers. Investigators found that the glideslope antenna cable had not been securely connected, which rendered some of the avionics useless, increasing the workload for the pilot. Investigators also concluded that the pilot had been awake for 18 consecutive hours before the accident and that the aircraft was loaded with the center of gravity too far aft, rendering it difficult to control. The accident was attributed to "the pilot's failure to maintain control of the airplane during the instrument approach in night instrument meteorological conditions, which resulted in the airplane exceeding its critical angle of attack and an aerodynamic stall/spin. Contributing to the accident were pilot fatigue, the pilot's increased workload during the instrument approach resulting from the lack of glideslope guidance due to an inadequately connected/secured glideslope antenna cable, and the airplane being loaded aft of its balance limit."
- On August 2, 2016, a Cessna 414A Chancellor crashed into the Gulf of Mexico after departing the Destin Executive Airport. After climbing to 1,000', the aircraft entered a steep right turn and descended at a steep rate before impacting the water in a nose-low attitude. The probable cause of the accident was found to be the pilot's loss of control due to spatial disorientation shortly after takeoff, while maneuvering over water during dark night conditions.
- On August 5, 2018, a Cessna 414 scheduled to land at John Wayne Airport crashed into a Staples parking lot a few blocks north of the airport in nearby Santa Ana, killing at least five people.
- On October 30, 2019, American cardiologist Dr. Michael Schloss was killed at age 77 after his Cessna 414 crashed in Colonia, NJ, 4 miles from Linden Airport, his destination.
- On October 8, 2020, a twin-engine Cessna 414 with seven passengers onboard crashed after departing from the North Palm Beach County General Aviation Airport. Multiple passengers were taken to a nearby hospital with traumatic injuries.
- On June 8, 2025, a Cessna 414, registered N414BA, departed San Diego Intl Airport on a IFR route to Phoenix Sky-Harbor Airport. As the aircraft was climbing, the pilot advised the SoCal Departure controller that he was having difficulty maintaining altitude and heading. At 1930:12Z, a MAYDAY was transmitted. The aircraft impacted water at just after 1930:18Z. 6 occupants died.

== Specifications (414A Chancellor) ==
Data from Jane's All The World's Aircraft 1982–83

General characteristics

- Crew: one or two
- Capacity: four to six
- Length: 36 ft 4 1/2 in (11.09 m)
- Wingspan: 44 ft 1 1/2 in (13.45 m)
- Height: 11 ft 5 1/2 in (3.49 m)
- Wing area: 225.8 sq ft (20.98 m^{2})
- Empty weight: 4,368 lb (1,981 kg)
- Max takeoff weight: 6,750 lb (3,062 kg)
- Fuel capacity: 213 US gal (177 imp gal; 810 L) usable
- Powerplant: 2 × Continental TSIO-520-NB flat-six turbocharged piston, 310 hp (230 kW) each
- Propellers: 3-bladed McCauley 3AF32C505/82NEA-5.5 constant speed propellers, 6 ft 4 1/5 in (1.94 m) diameter

Performance

- Maximum speed: 270 mph (435 km/h, 235 kn) at 20,000 ft (6,100 m)
- Cruise speed: 211 mph (339 km/h, 183 kn) at 10,000 ft (3,000 m) (econ. cruise)
- Stall speed: 83 mph (133 km/h, 72 kn) CAS (flaps down, power off)
- Range: 1,527 mi (2,458 km, 1,327 nmi) at 10,000 ft (3,000 m)
- Service ceiling: 30,800 ft (9,400 m)
- Rate of climb: 1,520 ft/min (7.7 m/s)
