= Wise GT-400 =

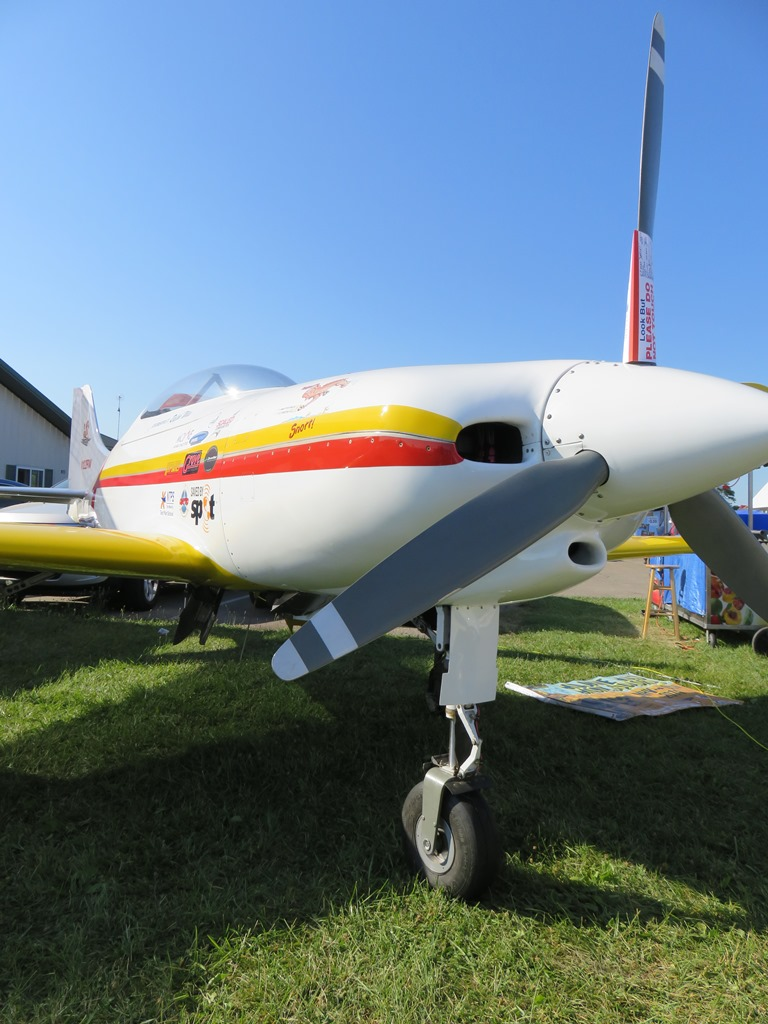
- Wise GT-400

General information
- Type: Racing aircraft
- National origin: United States
- Designer: Ralph Wise

The Wise GT-400 "Snort" is an American two place racing aircraft that was designed by Ralph Wise.

== Design and development ==
The GT-400 is a tandem seat, low wing, retractable tricycle gear monoplane. The fuselage is composite construction with aluminum wings.

== Specifications (GT-400) ==
General characteristics

- Crew: 1 pilot
- Capacity: 1 passenger
- Wingspan: 22 ft (6.7 m)
- Empty weight: 1,900 lb (862 kg)
- Gross weight: 2,600 lb (1,179 kg)
- Powerplant: 1 × Continental IO-520 , 300 hp (220 kW)

Performance

- Cruise speed: 240 kn (280 mph, 440 km/h)
