= Aero Commander 500 family =

Family of twin-engine utility transport aircraft

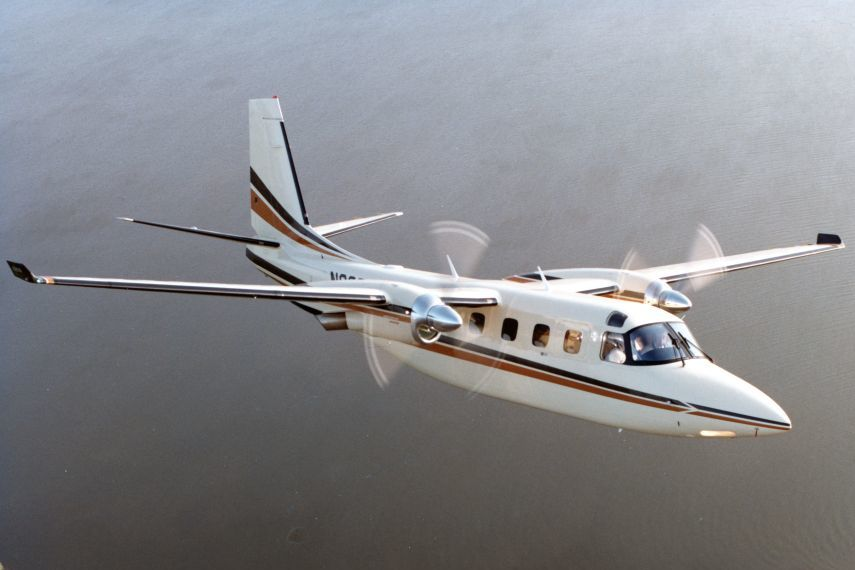
- 695A Jetprop 1000

General information
- Type: Utility and business aircraft
- National origin: United States
- Manufacturer: Aero Design and Engineering Company; Aero Commander; Rockwell-Standard Corporation; North American Rockwell; Rockwell International; Gulfstream Aerospace
- Status: Active
- Number built: ~2,902 (1951 piston-engined, 951 turboprops)

History
- Manufactured: 1951–1986
- Introduction date: October 1952
- First flight: 23 April 1948 (Model L3085)
- Developed into: IAI Westwind

The Aero Commander 500 family (also known as the Twin Commander) is a series of light twin piston-engined and turboprop aircraft designed and originally produced by the Aero Design and Engineering Company in the late 1940s, renamed the Aero Commander company in 1950, and later a division of Rockwell International in 1965. Final production occurred in 1986 under the Gulfstream Aerospace name.

The initial production version, which was first delivered in 1951, was the 200 mph (320 km/h; 170 kn), seven-seat Aero Commander 520. Numerous early aircraft were sold to military operators, including the United States Air Force and the United States Army. One was used as the presidential transport aircraft, Air Force One, for Dwight D. Eisenhower between 1956 and 1960. The Belgian Air Force also flew one as the personal transport of Baudouin of Belgium between 1961 and 1973. The Aero Commander was also operated by various types of civil operators, including as a business aircraft and cargo aircraft. During its later service life, the Federal Aviation Administration (FAA) looked into the aircraft's main wing spar, which was believed to be susceptible to stress fatigue and subsequent cracking, thus allegedly resulting in several fatal crashes.

Further development of the Aero Commander proceeded throughout the type's production life of almost 40 years. In 1967, an improved version of that aircraft, the 500S Shrike Commander, was launched. Several of the larger variants have been given their own model names and designations, ranging up to the 330 mph (530 km/h; 290 kn), 11-seat Model 695B/Jetprop 1000B turboprop.

== Design and development ==
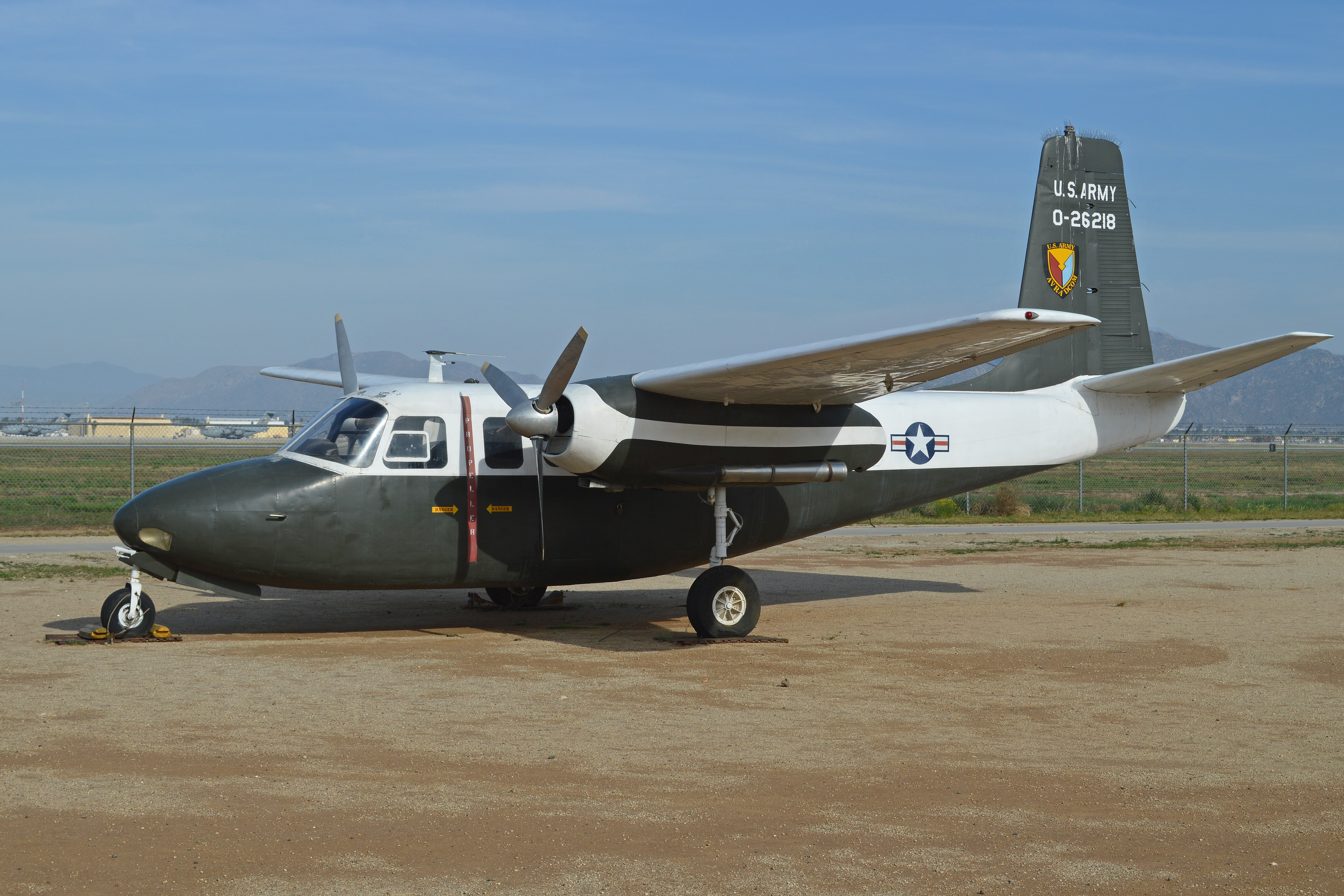
The first model, the five-seat 520, was certified in January 1952 with two 260 HP Lycoming GO-435s

The concept for the Commander light business twin was conceived by Ted Smith, a project engineer at the Douglas Aircraft Company. Working part-time after hours throughout 1944, a group of engineers that worked on the Douglas A-20 Havoc came together to form the Aero Design and Engineering Company with the goal of designing and producing this envisioned aircraft, which would have a layout similar to their A-20 bomber. Originally, the new company was going to build three pre-production aircraft, but as the first aircraft was being built, they decided to build just one prototype. The final configuration was completed in July 1946 and was designated the Model L3805.

Registered NX1946, the prototype first flew on 23 April 1948. The L3805 accommodated up to five people and was powered by a pair of Lycoming O-435-A piston engines. It was an all-metal high-wing monoplane with retractable undercarriage and used several components sourced from a Vultee BT-13 Valiant. The market segment planned for this aircraft included small feeder airliners, aided by its range of 1,000 miles; however, in practice, the majority of customer demand came from the private business aircraft sector as well as military operators. Walter Beech test flew the aircraft in 1949 and expressed interest in buying the project, but ultimately chose to pass on the aircraft to instead develop the Beechcraft Twin Bonanza. Fairchild Aircraft also evaluated the prototype at its headquarters in Hagerstown, Maryland.

The prototype successfully validated the aircraft's design. The company secured a lease on a new 26,000 square feet (2,400 m^{2}) factory at Bethany near Oklahoma City to build a production version, which was certified on 30 June 1950. Nearly 10,000 hours of redesign work took place to produce the initial production aircraft, which was equipped with more powerful Lycoming GO-435-C2 engines, which had a combined rating of 520 horsepower (390 kW). The first of these production aircraft, which was named the Commander 520, was rolled out of the Bethany factory in August 1951. Serial number 1 was briefly used as a demonstrator before being sold in October 1952 to the Asahi Shimbun Press Company of Tokyo.

In terms of its general configuration, the Aero Commander 500 is an all-metal twin-engined light transport aircraft, fitted with a high-mounted cantilever wing and furnished with retractable landing gear. The aircraft is primarily composed of aluminium and uses semi-monocoque construction. Later-built models, such as the Shrike Commander 500S, were outfitted with an avionics suit to facilitate all-weather flight, and could be optionally equipped with deicing boots for use in cold climates. The Shrike Commander model could accommodate a seven-seat cabin configuration if a rear bench seat was fitted. Numerous amenities could also be fitted in the cabin, including curtains, a fold-away desk, and storage cabinets. On later models, the fuselage was stretched, the gross weight increased, and more powerful engines were fitted.

While not a typical use of the type, the aircraft's favourable handling capabilities at both high and low speeds, even when flown with a single working engine, led to it being occasionally performing aerobatics maneuvers. While such display aircraft did not typically require without major modifications, they were sometimes fitted with propeller unfeathering systems as well as smoke generators. As all of the fuel tanks are interconnected, there was no need for pilots to perform either tank selection or cross-feeding. The landing gear had been designed for use on aircraft twice the size of the Aero Commander, making it relatively sturdy and well-suited to use from unprepared airstrips.

== Operational history ==
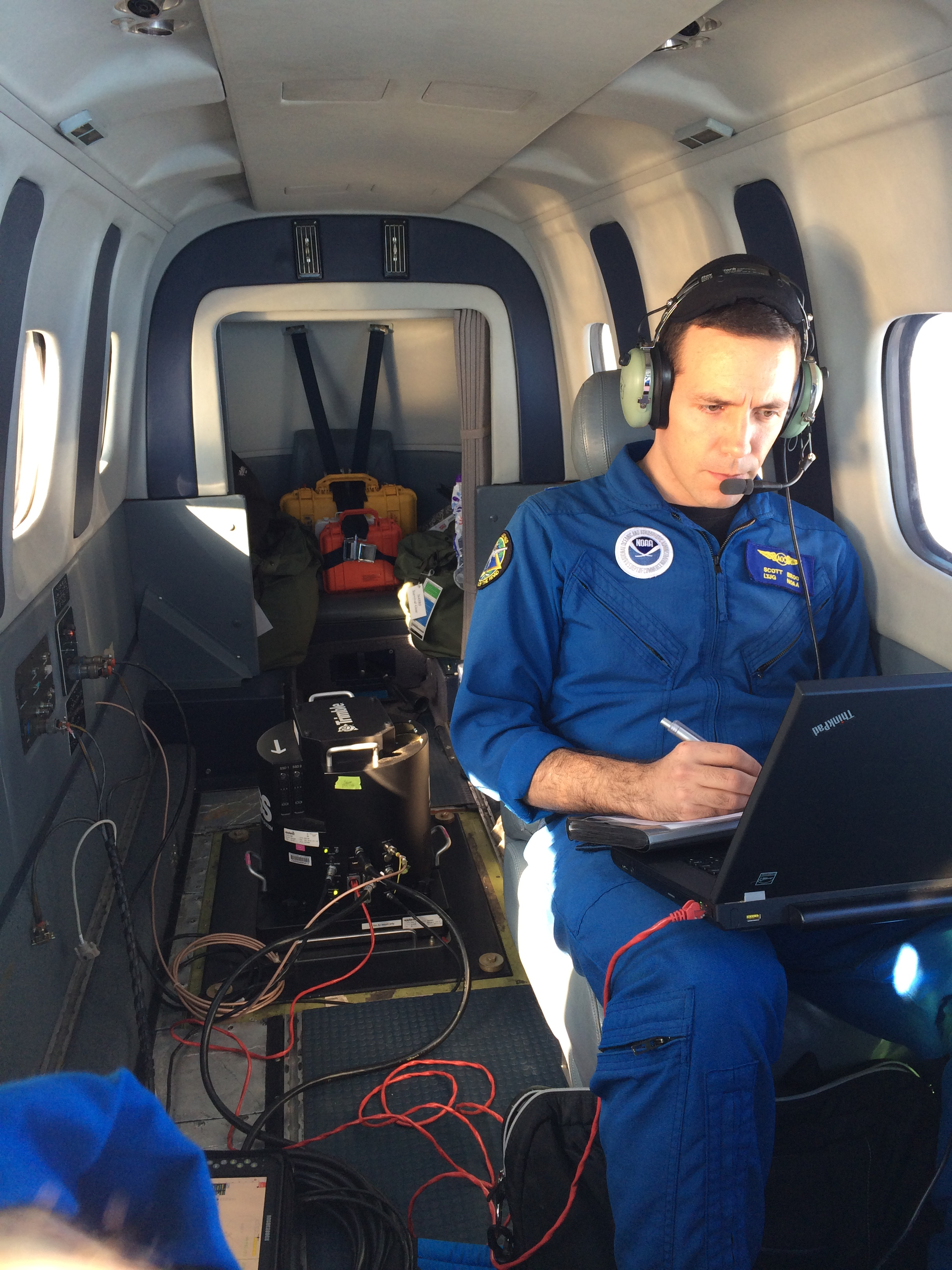
Special mission cabin for the NOAA

In US military service, it was initially designated the L-26, though in 1962 this was changed to U-4 for the United States Air Force and U-9 for the United States Army.

Under ownership of Rockwell in the 1960s, World War II pilot R. A. "Bob" Hoover demonstrated the Shrike Commander 500S for decades in a variety of "managed energy" routines, including single-engine and engine-out aerobatics. His Shrike Commander is displayed in the colors of his last sponsor, Evergreen International Aviation, at the Steven F. Udvar-Hazy Center of the Smithsonian National Air and Space Museum. Bob Odegaard continued the tradition in 2012, flying a 1975 Shrike 500S in a Bob Hoover tribute routine.

One U-4B was operated as Air Force One, the presidential transport aircraft, for Dwight D. Eisenhower between 1956 and 1960. Often personally flown by Eisenhower, it was the first presidential aircraft to be powered by only two engines as well as the first to wear the now-familiar blue-and-white livery. Also used to transport other senior politicians, such as the Secretary of Defense and the Secretary of the Air Force, it was later transferred to the USAF Academy’s skydiving team. This aircraft is now owned by the Commemorative Air Force.

By 2004, numerous Shrike Commanders remained in service with the United States Customs Service, United States Coast Guard, and United States Forest Service.

A single 560F was operated by the Belgian Air Force as the personal transport of the late king Baudouin of Belgium between 1961 and 1973.

According to the July 1, 1968, Frontier Airlines system timetable, series 500 aircraft were being operated on scheduled passenger flights by Combs Aviation on behalf of Frontier via a contract agreement with service to several smaller communities in Montana and Wyoming at this time.

The unpressurized, long-fuselage 680FL was operated as a small package freighter by Combs Freightair in the 1970s and 1980s, and by Suburban Air Freight in the 1980s and 1990s. The aircraft was popular with pilots, because it was extremely "pilot friendly" and with its 380 hp (280 kW) supercharged engines did well in icing meteorological conditions. A number are still operated on contracts for cargo and fire control applications, as their piston engines offer good fuel specifics at low altitudes and longer loiter times. Suburban retired their last 680FLs in the first half of 2024.

=== Wing spar fatigue ===
In June 1991, senior company engineers met with Federal Aviation Administration (FAA) officials to discuss concerns over the Aero Commander's main wing spar, which was believed to be susceptible to stress fatigue and subsequent cracking, and was believed to have resulted in a number of fatal crashes. From approximately 1961 to 1993, 24 aircraft crashed when spar failures caused the loss of the wing in flight. 35 more spars were found cracked during inspections.

=== Single-engine safety ===
In 1950, when the developers were working to satisfy Civil Aeronautics Authority (CAA) regulations for certification of the 500, they chose a novel method of demonstrating its single-engine safety and performance: they removed one of the two-bladed propellers, secured it in the aft cabin, and flew from Bethany to Washington, D.C., on one engine. There they met with CAA personnel, then replaced the propeller and returned to Oklahoma in the conventional manner. The flight received nationwide coverage in the press.

In 1979, the National Transportation Safety Board reviewed light-twin engine-failure accidents, involving the 24 most popular model-groups of light twins between 1972 and 1976. They found that the piston-engined twin-Commanders had averaged slightly over 3.4 engine-failure accidents per hundred-thousand hours, the second worst number of all aircraft under review. The most engine failures were suffered by the small-engine versions of the Piper Apache, at 6.9 failures per hundred thousand hours; the third-worst, the Beechcraft Travel Air, averaged 2.9 failures; the average for all models was only 1.6.

Countering the statistical evidence, Rockwell demonstration pilot Bob Hoover's airshow stunt routine, with the Shrike Commander, included a full aerobatic routine performed first with both engines, then with one engine out (and the critical engine, at that), then both engines out, and gliding. Then in his final airshow performance, in a demonstration of conservation of momentum, he landed. The Shrike Commander dead stick (engines off), coasted the airplane down the runway then from the runway and taxied to the audience.

The turboprop twin-Commanders—with much more powerful engines (and most with longer bodies, allowing greater rudder leverage, critical for single-engine control) – came out on the opposite end of the rankings, with one of the lowest rates of engine-failure accidents of all "light" twins examined, at only 0.4 per hundred-thousand hours.

== Variants ==
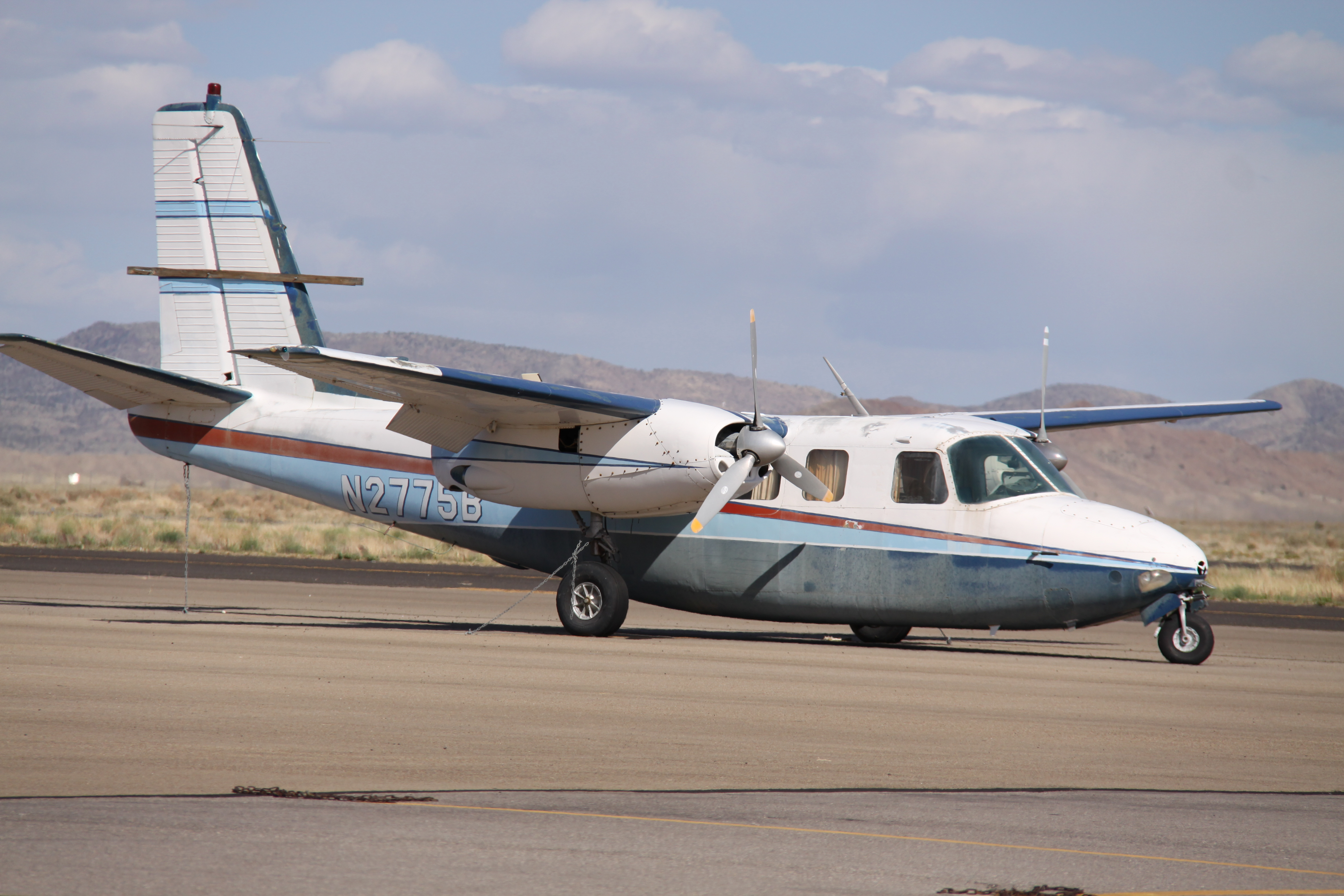
Certified from 1954, the seven-seat 560 is powered by two 270–295 hp (201–220 kW) Lycoming GO-480s.

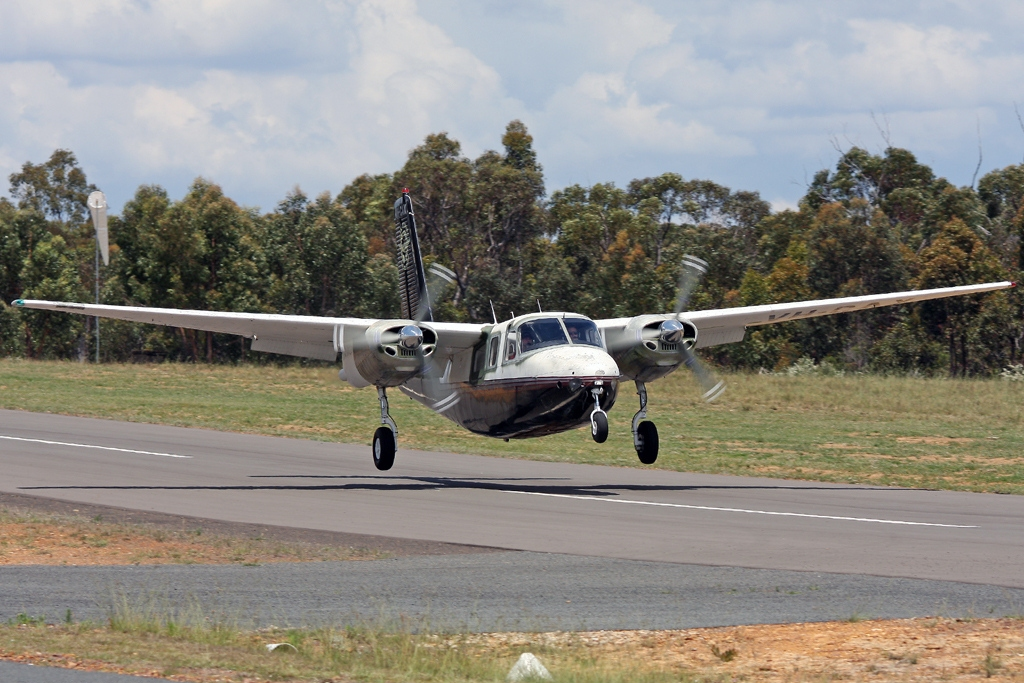
From 1955, the 680 has Supercharged 340–380 hp (250–280 kW) Lycoming GSO-480s.

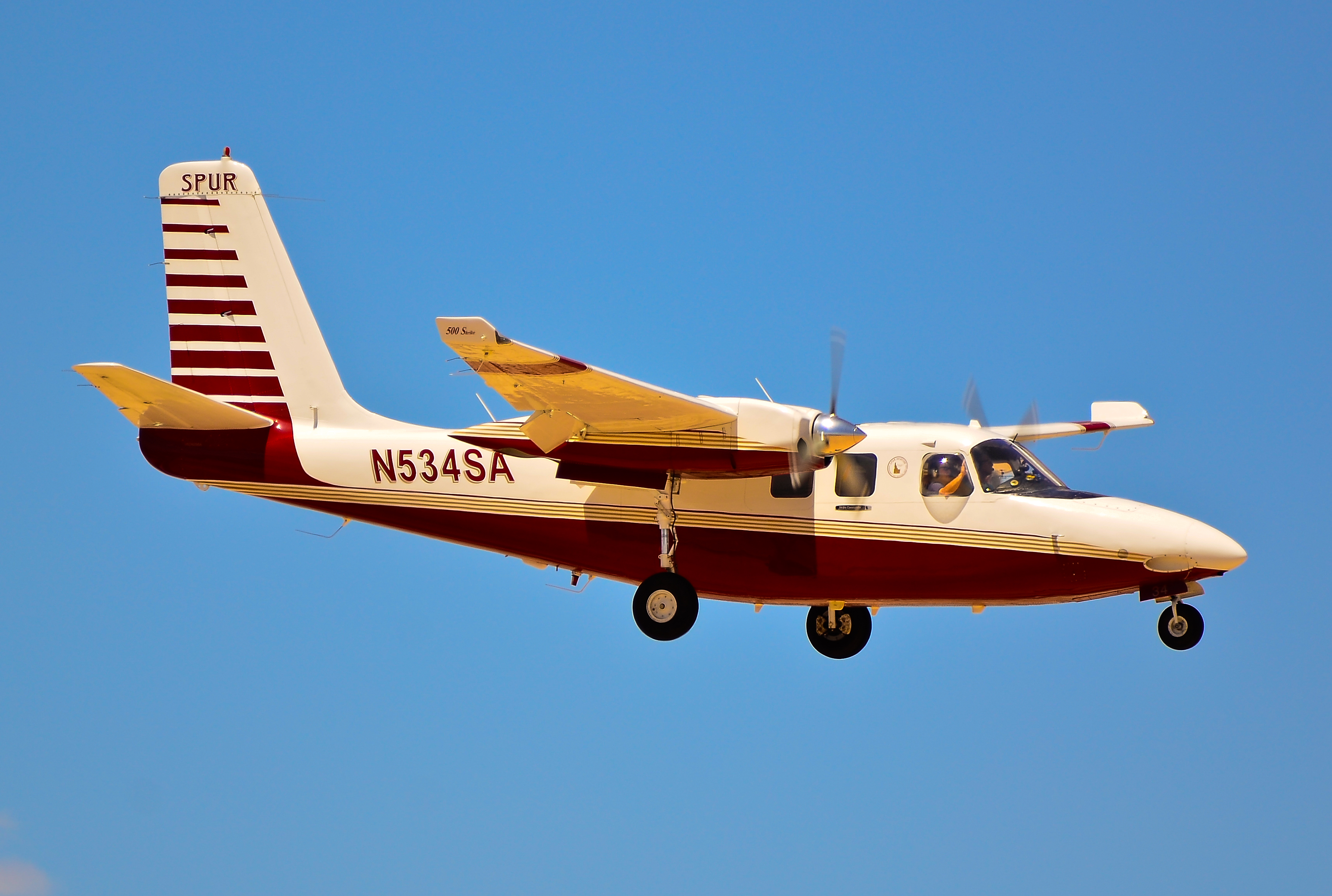
From 1958, the lighter 500 is powered by two 250–290 hp (190–220 kW) Lycoming O-540s or Continental IO-470s.

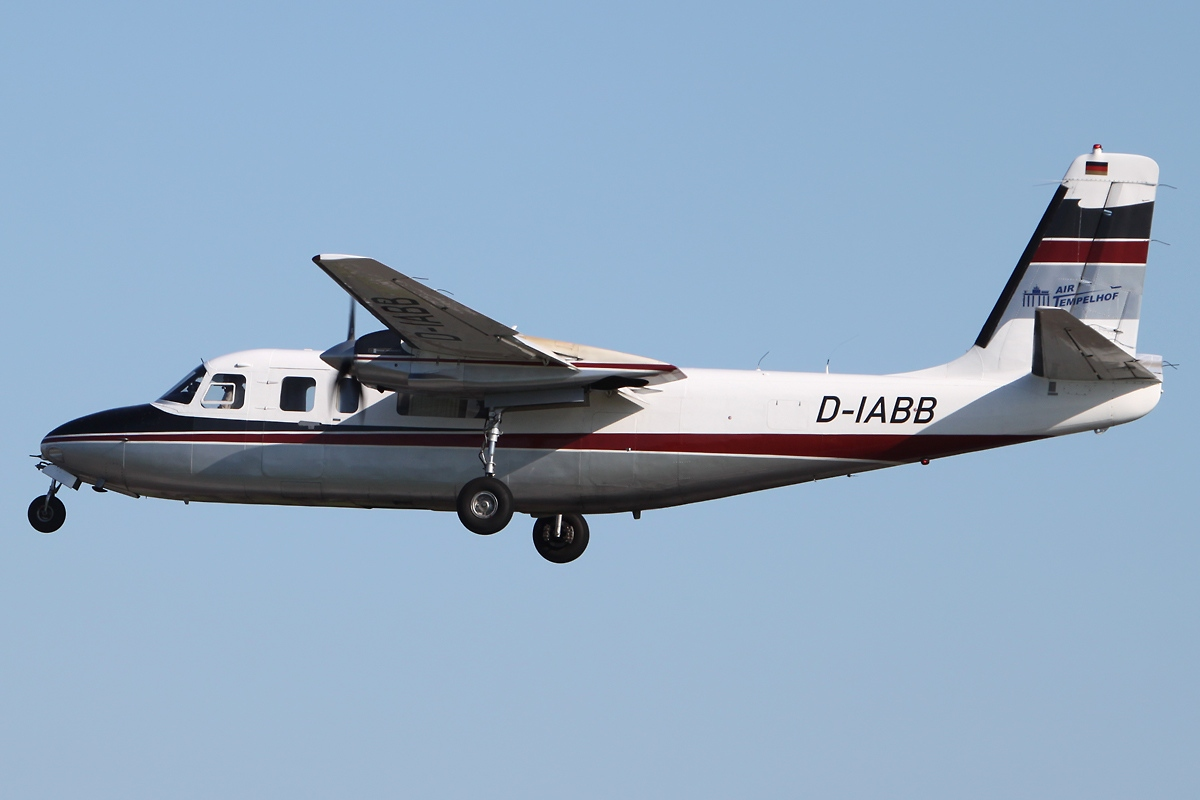
From 1963, the stretched 680-FL offered up to eleven seats.

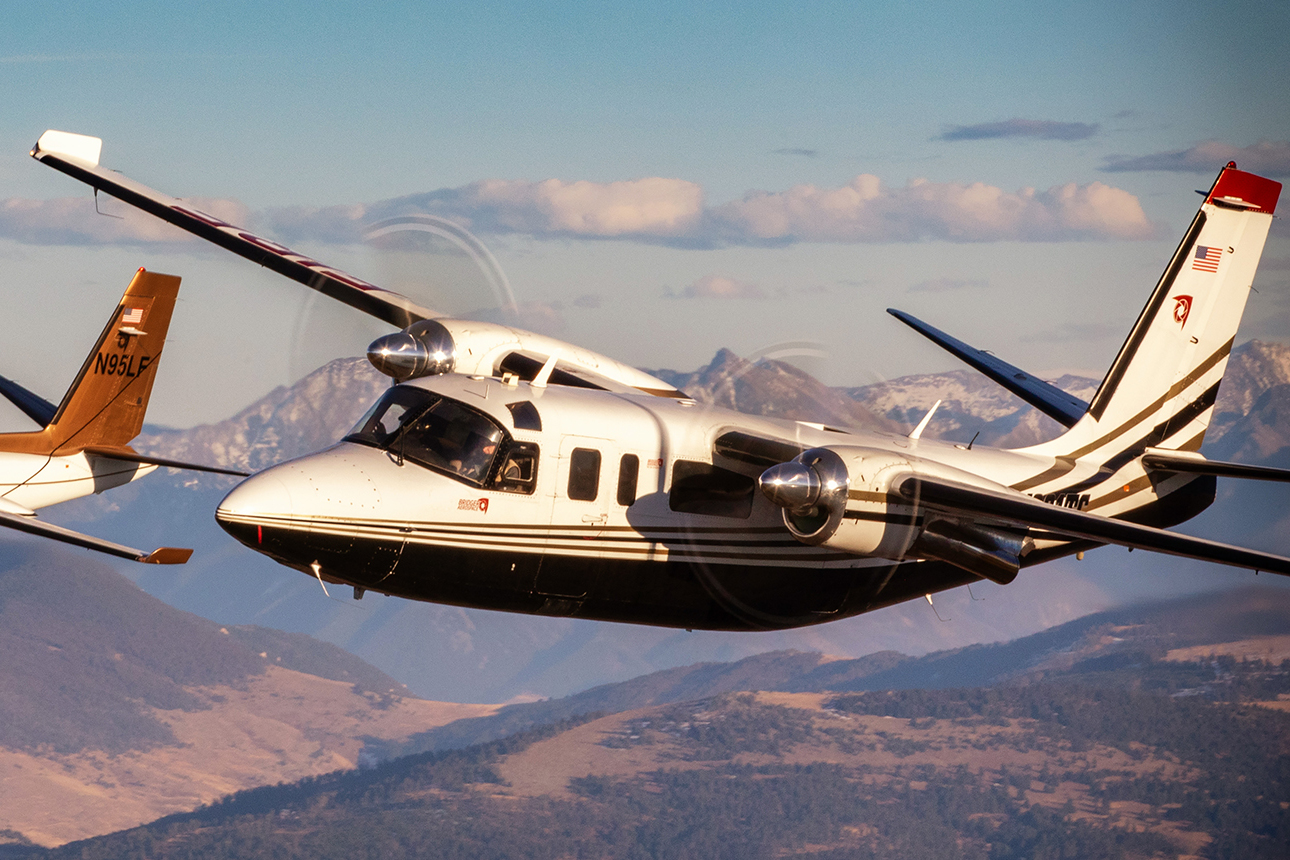
It gained two 575 hp (429 kW) AiResearch TPE-331 turboprops from the 680-T in 1965.

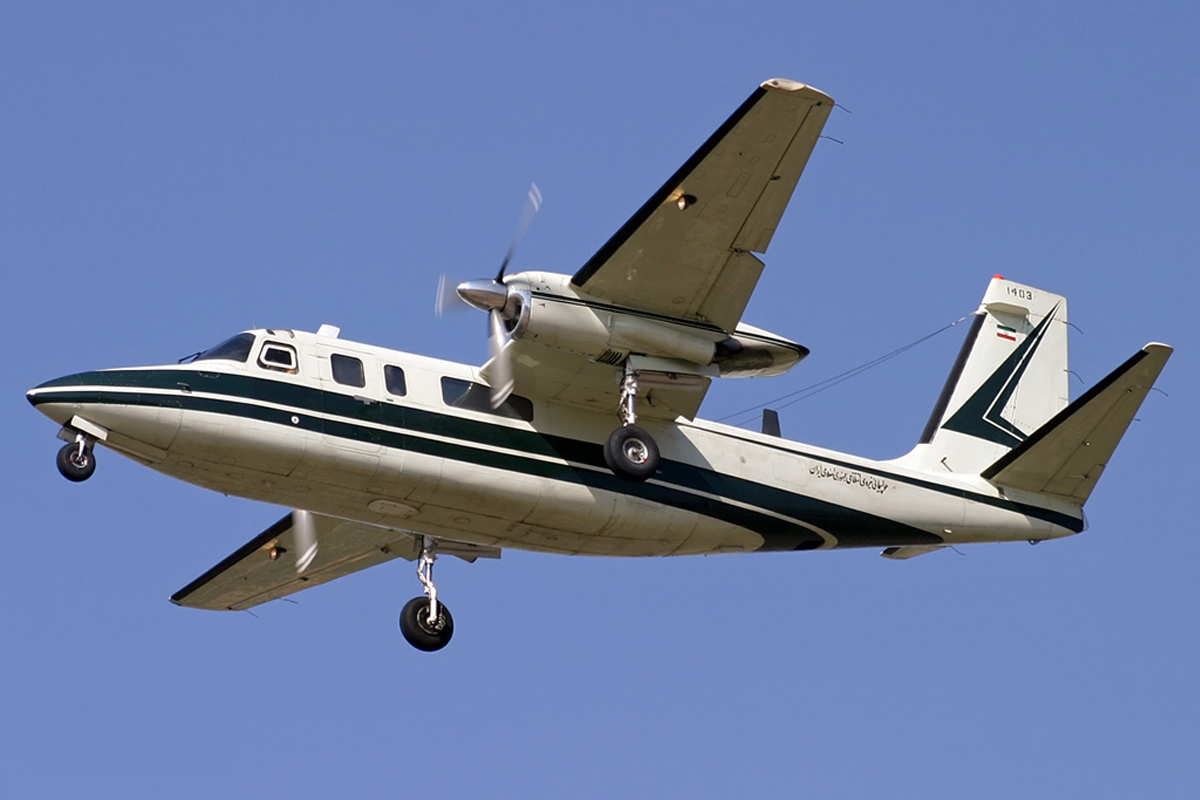
From 1971, the heavier 690 has a larger wing and more powerful 717.5–748 hp (535–558 kW) TPE-331s.

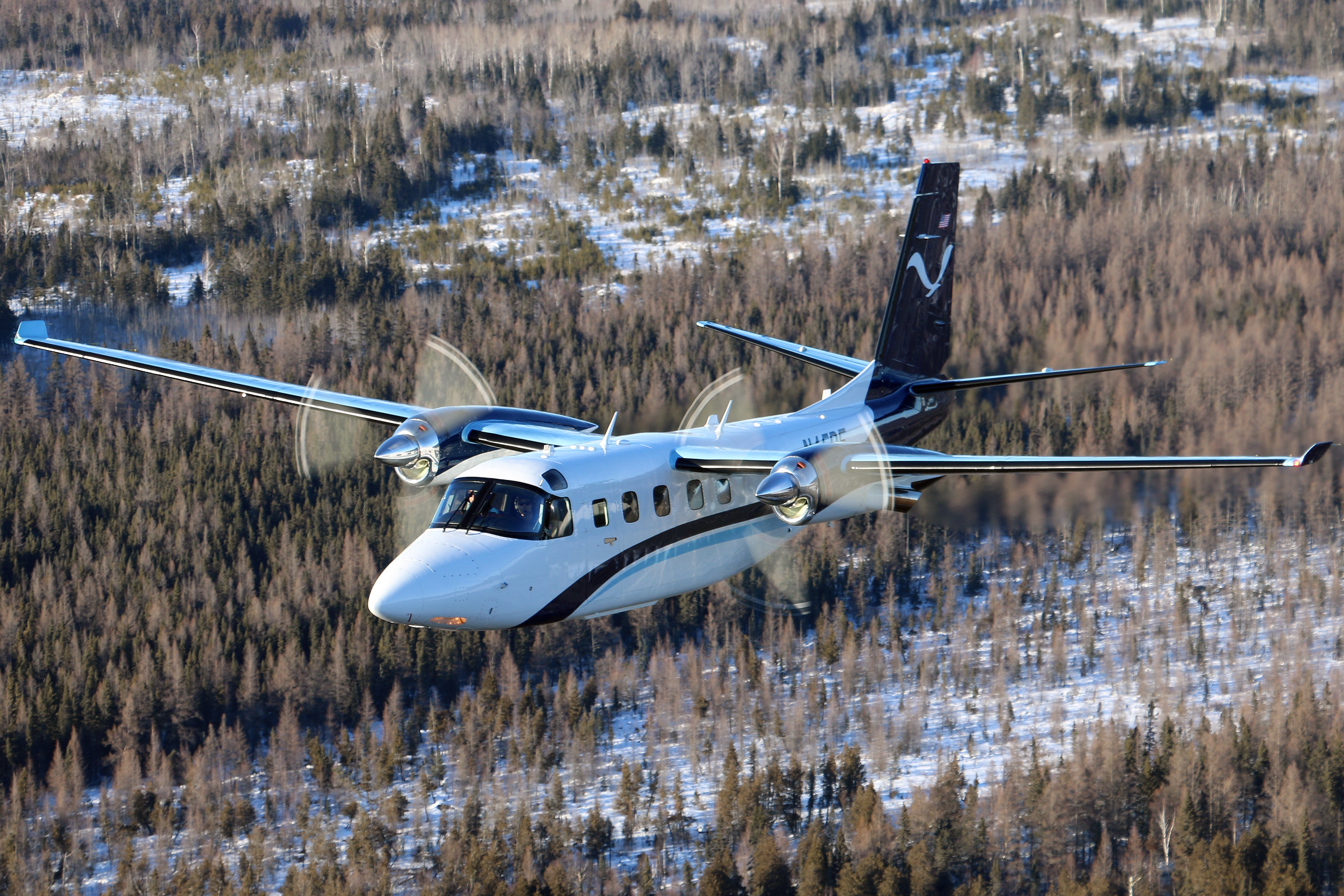
From 1979, the final 695 Jetprop 980/1000 is powered by 733–820 hp (547–611 kW) TPE-331s.

Type certificate data sheet 6A1 and 2A4
model	name	approved	TC	engines	power	MTOW	ceiling	seats	fuel	built
L-3805										1
520		1952-01-31	6A1	2× GO-435-C2/C2B	2× 260	5500-5700		5	145	150
560		1954-05-28	6A1	2× GO-480-B/B1C	2× 270	6000		7	145	80
560	520 with more power, increased weight, swept tail, plus revised wing, landing gear, fuselage, and primary control system									
560A		1955-07-01	6A1	2× GO-480-D/C/G	2× 275	6000		7	156	
560A	560 with longer fuselage, revised engine installation, wing, landing gear, fuel and oil systems									
560E		1957-02-21	6A1	2× GO-480-C/G	2× 295	6500		7	223	93
560E	560A with Larger wings and greater payload, revised engine installation, wing, wheel and brake installation, fuel system with outboard tanks, and landing gear location									
560F		1961-02-08	2A4	2× IGO-540-B	2× 350	7500		7	223	
560F	680F with normally aspirated engine and reduced gross weight									
360					2× 180			4		1
360	Lightened 560E									
500		1958-07-24	6A1	2× O-540-A2B	2× 250	6000		7	156	101
500	560E with decreased gross weight, powerplants, and 560A landing gear									
500A	Aero Commander	1960-04-07	6A1	2× IO-470-M	2× 260	6000		7	156	99
500A	500 with new nacelles, fuel injected Continental engines and new landing gear									
500B		1960-07-13	6A1	2× IO-540-B/E	2× 290	6750		7	156	217
500B	500A with Lycoming engines and 3-bladed props.									
500U	Shrike Commander	1964-12-11	6A1	2× IO-540-E	2× 290	6750		7	156	56
500U	500B with pointed nose and squared off tail.									
500S	Shrike Commander	1968-03-15	6A1	2× IO-540-E	2× 290	6750		7	156	316
500S	500U with minor changes									
680 Super	L-26C → U-4B (Note: 2 built for the US Air Force); L-26C → U-9C (Note: 4 built for the US Army)	1955-10-14	2A4	2× GSO-480-A1A6	2× 340	7000		7	223	254
680 Super	supercharged 560A									
680E		1958-06-19	2A4	2× GSO-480-B1A6	2× 340	7500		7	223	100
680E	680 with Lightened 560E/560A type undercarriage, extended wing and increased maximum weight									
720	AltiCruiser	1958-12-05	2A4	2× GSO-480-B1A6	2× 340	7500		6	223	13
720	Pressurized 680-E, structural modifications to the fuselage, extended wing and increased maximum weight									
680F		1960-08-23	2A4	2× IGSO-540-B	2× 380	8000		7	223	126
680F	680E with fuel injection engine, new nacelles, new main gear and increased maximum weight									
680FP					2× 380				223	26
680FP	Pressurized 680F									
680FL	Grand Commander	1963-05-24	2A4	2× IGSO-540-B	2× 380	7000-8500		11	223	157
680FL	680F with larger tail, 2 built for the US Army as the RL-26D → RU-9D with SLAR, Courser Commander after 1967; stretched									
680FL(P)	Grand Commander	1964-10-08	2A4	2× IGSO-540-B1A/B1C	2× 380	8500		11	223	37
680FL(P)	pressurized 680FL									
680T	Turbo Commander	1965-09-15	2A4	2× TPE-331-43	2× 575	8950	25,000 ft	11	286.5	56
680T	680FL/P turboprop									
680V	Turbo Commander	1967-06-13	2A4	2× TPE-331-43	2× 575	9400	25,000 ft	11	286.5	36
680V	680T with slightly improved cargo capacity									
680W	Turbo II Commander	1968-02-05	2A4	2× TPE-331-43BL	2× 575	9400	25,000 ft	11	286.5	46
680W	680V with pointed nose. squared off fin, one panoramic and two small cabin windows and weather radar									
681	Hawk Commander	1969-03-20	2A4	2× TPE-331-43BL	2× 575	9400	25,000 ft	11	286.5	43
681	680W with improved pressurisation, air conditioning system and nose									
681B	Turbo Commander						25,000 ft			29
681B	Marketing designation for economy version of the 681									
685	Commander	1971-09-17	2A4	2× GTSIO-520-F/K	2× 435	9000	25,000 ft	9	256-322	66
685	690 powered by piston engines									
690	Commander 690	1971-07-19	2A4	2× TPE-331-5	2× 717.5	10250	25,000 ft	11	384	79
690	681 with new wing centre section and engines moved further outboard									
690A	Commander 690A	1973-04-25	2A4	2× TPE-331-5	2× 717.5	10250	31,000 ft	11	384	245
690A	690 with changed flightdeck layout and increased pressurisation									
690B	Commander 690B	1976-10-05	2A4	2× TPE-331-5	2× 717.5	10325	31,000 ft	10	384	217
690B	690A with improved soundproofing and internal lavatory									
690C	Jetprop 840	1979-09-07	2A4	2× TPE-331-5	2× 717.5	10325	31,000 ft	11	384	136
690C	690B with increased wingspan, wet wing fuel tanks and winglets									
690D	Jetprop 900	1981-12-02	2A4	2× TPE 331-5	2× 748	10700	31,000 ft	11	425-474	42
690D	690C with internal rear cabin extension, improved pressurisation and five square cabin windows									
695	Jetprop 980	1979-11-01	2A4	2× TPE-331-10	2× 733	10325	31,000 ft	11	425-474	84
695	more powerful 690C									
695A	Jetprop 1000	1981-04-30	2A4	2× TPE-331-10	2× 820	11200	35,000 ft	11	474	101
695A	more powerful 690D with higher takeoff weight, built for the NOAA									
695B	Jetprop 1000B	1984-02-15	2A4	2× TPE-331-10	2× 820	11750	35,000 ft	11	474	6
695B	695A with minor changes									

== Operators ==
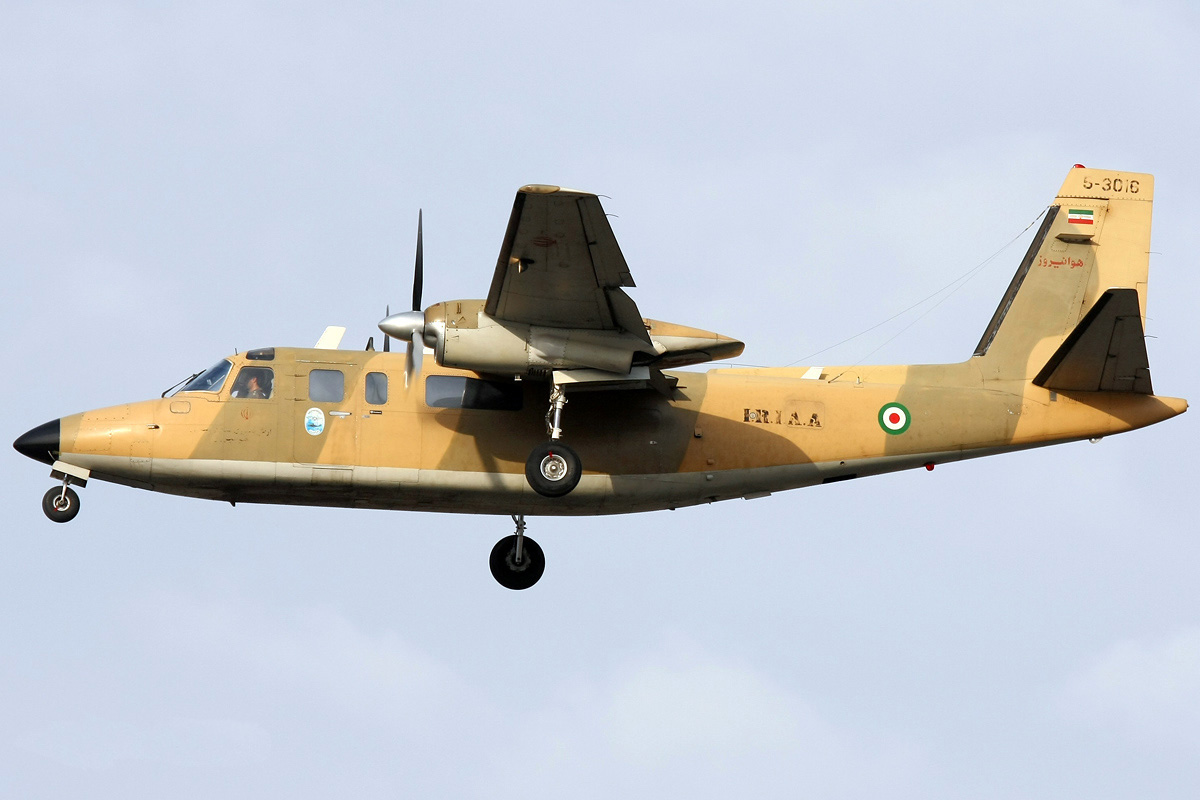
Islamic Republic of Iran Army Aviation 690A

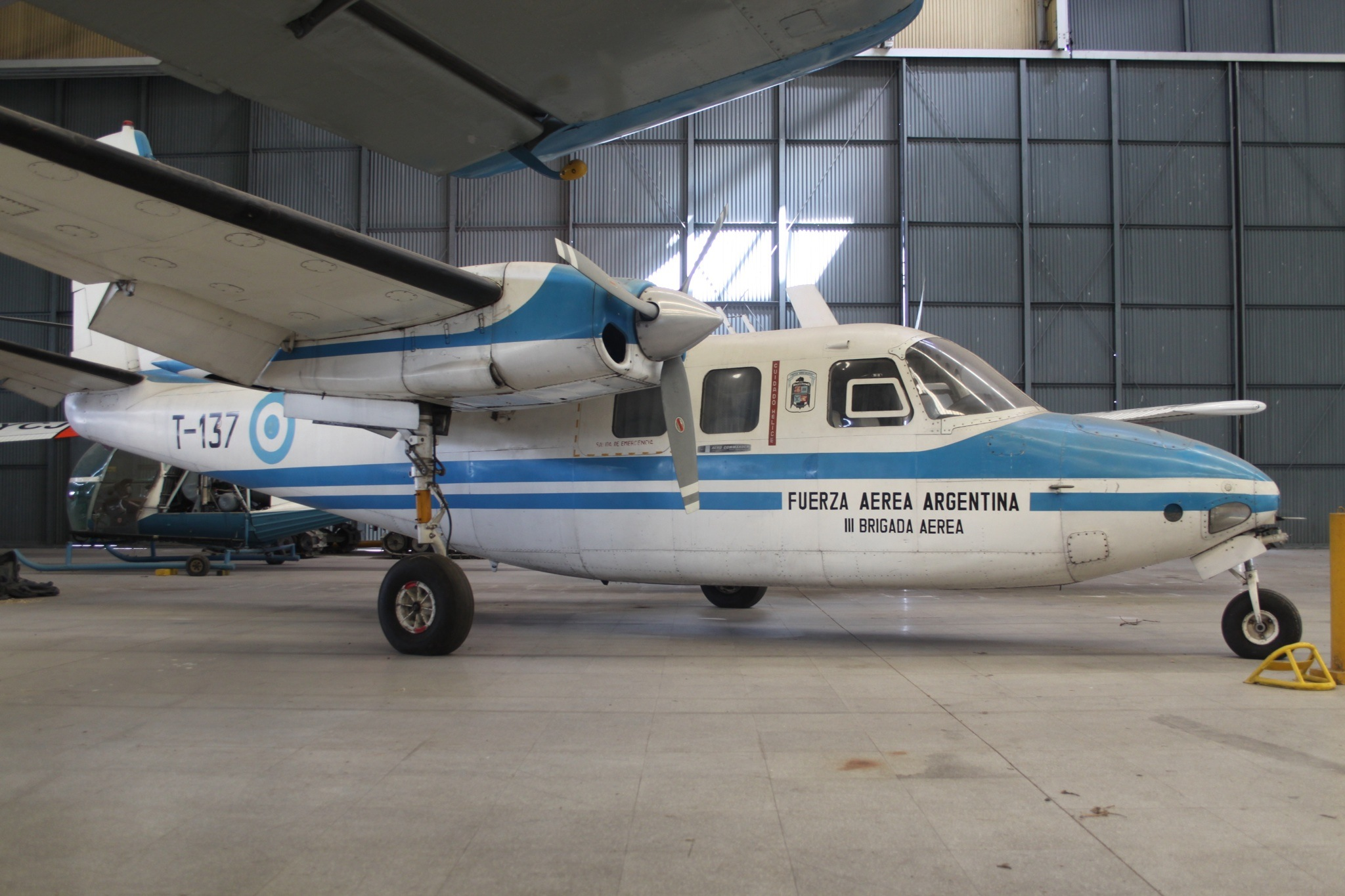
Argentine Air Force 500U

=== Government operators ===
United States

- Texas Highway Patrol

Indonesia

- Indonesian National Police

=== Military operators ===
Algeria

- Algerian Air Force – 1 x 680E survey aircraft in 1986

Angola

- Angolan Air Force – 1 x 690A VIP aircraft in 1986

Argentina

- Argentine Air Force – 1 x 500B, 27 x 500U and 1 x 680
- Argentine Army Aviation – 680V, 690A

Bahamas

- Royal Bahamas Defence Force – 500S. Retired by 1990.

Benin

- Benin Air Force – 1 x 500B

Bolivia

- Bolivian Air Force – 1 x 690 in 1986

Burkina Faso

- Burkina Faso Air Force – 1 x 500B in 1986

Colombia

- Colombian Aerospace Force
- National Army of Colombia

Costa Rica

- Public Force of Costa Rica

Cuba

- Cuban Air Force – 1 × 560 acquired in late 1956.

Dominican Republic

- Air Force of the Dominican Republic

Greece

- Hellenic Army – 2 x 680FL

Guatemala

- Guatemalan Air Force

Honduras

- Honduran Air Force

Indonesia

- Indonesian Army Aviation Command – 2 x 680FL

Iran

- Islamic Republic of Iran Air Force – 3 x 681B
- Islamic Republic of Iran Army Aviation – 3 x 690, 2 x 690A
- Islamic Republic of Iran Navy Aviation – 2 x 500S, 2 x 690, 6 x 690A

Ivory Coast

- Ivory Coast Air Force – 1 x 500B

Kenya

- Kenya Air Force – 1 x 680FP (no longer operated)

Kingdom of Laos

- Royal Lao Air Force – 1 x 560 (no longer operated)

Republic of Korea

- Republic of Korea Air Force – 3 x 520, 2 x 560F

Mexico

- Mexican Air Force – 20 x 500S

Nicaragua

- Fuerza Aérea de la Guardia Nacional

Niger

- Niger Air Force – 1 x 500B

Pakistan

- Pakistan Air Force – 1 x 680E (with radar nose), 1 x 680F
- Pakistan Army Aviation – 1 x 690B

Panama

- Panamanian Air Force

Philippines

- Philippine Air Force - 2 Units for ELINT.

Thailand

- Royal Thai Air Force – Aero Commander 690A, locally designated B.PhTh.4 (Thai: บ.ผท.๔).

United States

- United States Air Force as the L-26 and U-4
- United States Army as the L-26 and U-9

Venezuela

- Bolivarian Navy of Venezuela

=== Civil operators ===
Samoa

- Talofa Airways

== Notable accidents ==
- On 19 June 1964 Senator Ted Kennedy was a passenger in an Aero Commander 680 airplane flying in bad weather from Washington, D.C., to Massachusetts. It crashed into an apple orchard in the western Massachusetts town of Southampton on the final approach to the Barnes Municipal Airport near Westfield. The pilot and Edward Moss, one of Kennedy's aides, were killed. Kennedy suffered a severe back injury, a punctured lung, broken ribs and internal bleeding.
- World War II hero and actor Audie Murphy died in an Aero Commander 680 crash while flying as a passenger on 28 May 1971. The aircraft was flying in bad weather at night and was on approach to Roanoke, Virginia when it flew into the side of Brush Mountain outside Blacksburg, Virginia, West of Roanoke. Four others and the pilot were also killed.
- On the evening of May 19, 1973, kidney transplant pioneer, Dr. David M. Hume was killed after he lost control of his Aero Commander 560-F twin. He departed with a special (night) VFR clearance into marginal and rapidly deteriorating visual weather conditions. A low cloud ceiling and emerging fog were among conditions deemed to have caused his spatial disorientation about four minutes into his climb out of Van Nuys Airport. Hume lost control of his plane ending in a fatal crash a few miles north of the airport in the Granada Hills district of Greater Los Angeles.
- On Sunday 2 October 1994, an Aero Commander 690 operated by Seaview Air as Flight CD111 departed from Williamtown, New South Wales, on a flight to Lord Howe Island. Eight passengers, including honeymooners and a family with two children, boarded the single-pilot aircraft. 30 minutes after departure a distress call was made by the pilot with no future communications made. Only some minor wreckage was ever recovered. During the investigation a number of safety breaches by the operator were discovered including regular operations with overweight aircraft, inaccessible safety equipment & illegal regular public transport operations when the operator was only approved to operate charter flights. The incident was a significant one to occur in Australia and led to a $20 million royal commission which resulted in fundamental changes to the governing aviation body in Australia.
- On 11 August 2002 photographer Galen Rowell, his wife Barbara Cushman Rowell, pilot Tom Reid and Reid's friend Carol McAffee were killed in an Aero Commander 690 crash near Eastern Sierra Regional Airport in Bishop, California.
- On 24 June 2026, while responding to a wildfire, an Aero Commander 690C (registration C-FNRP, Callsign "Bird Dog 104") operated by Buffalo Airways, crashed 50 km from Fort Simpson, NT, Canada, with all 3 crewmembers killed. The plane was dispatched as a Bird Dog to the wildfire, consisting on aerial supervision and coordinating the air tankers and helicopters in the fire airspace.

== Specifications (Rockwell Aero Commander 500S) ==
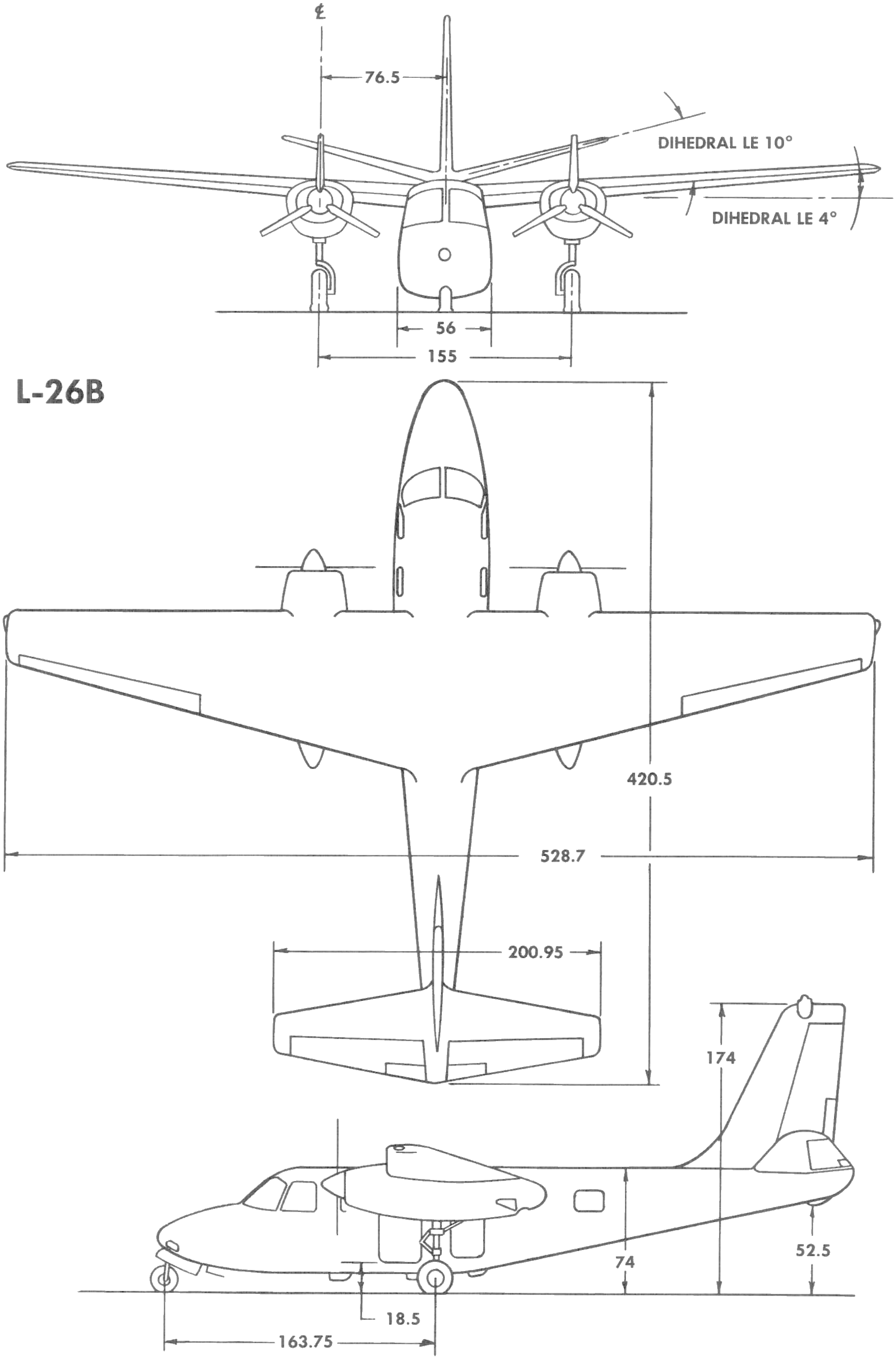
3-view line drawing of the Aero Commander L-26B

Data from Jane's all the world's aircraft 1976–77.

General characteristics

- Crew: Two
- Capacity: four passengers
- Length: 36 ft 9.75 in (11.22 m)
- Wingspan: 49 ft 0.5 in (14.95 m)
- Height: 14 ft 6 in (4.42 m)
- Wing area: 255 sq ft (23.69 m^{2})
- Aspect ratio: 9.45:1
- Airfoil: NACA 23012 modified
- Empty weight: 4,635 lb (2,102 kg)
- Max takeoff weight: 6,750 lb (3,062 kg)
- Powerplant: 2 × Lycoming IO-540-E1B5 air-cooled flat-six piston engines, 290 hp (216 kW) each

Performance

- Maximum speed: 215 mph (346 km/h, 187 kn) at sea level (TAS)
- Cruise speed: 203 mph (326 km/h, 176 kn) at 9,000 ft (2,750 m), 75% power, TAS
- Stall speed: 68 mph (109 km/h, 59 kn) flaps and landing gear down, CAS
- Minimum control speed: 75 mph (121 km/h, 65 kn)
- Range: 1,078 mi (1,735 km, 936 nmi)
- Service ceiling: 19,400 ft (5,913 m)
- Rate of climb: 1,340 ft/min (6.8 m/s)

== See also ==
- Bob Hoover
- Beechcraft King Air
- Partenavia P.68
