= David M. Hume =

David Milford Hume (21 October 1917, Muskegon, Michigan, United States - 19 May 1973), was an American medical doctor and pioneer in kidney disease research and treatment. He was part of the team that performed the first successful kidney transplant. Hume also published a landmark paper on renal transplantation. He graduated from Harvard College and the Pritzker School of Medicine.

== Legacy ==
Following Hume's untimely death in an airplane crash his legacy at The Medical College of Virginia lived on thanks to the efforts of Gene Pierce, Medical College of Virginia Medical School Surgery Department. Gene hired a health care administrator who transformed Hume's multiple grant funded transplant segments to a hospital based Medicare funded program when Medicare assumed the funding of End Stage Renal Disease.

The hospital's Dietary Department assumed responsibility for food service to the Transplant Unit and the hospital's clinical laboratory assumed responsibility for all lab work. The Tissue Typing Laboratory, Organ Harvesting Program and ALG Laboratory continued to function along with the Transplant Program's inpatient unit.

== Fatal airplane accident ==
On the evening of May 19, 1973, Hume flew alone from the Van Nuys Airport in California as pilot at the controls of his personal Aero Commander 560-F twin-engine aircraft into marginal weather conditions. Despite warnings against flying under visual flight rules (VFR) at night, he obtained a special (night) VFR clearance. As his plane departed, emerging adverse weather began to obstruct his visibility. A low cloud ceiling and fog caused what was deemed to be spatial disorientation of the pilot. Four minutes into the flight, Hume lost control of the aircraft a few miles north of the airport ending in an instantly fatal crash in the Granada Hills district.

== Hume-Lee Transplant Center ==
The original transplant program begun by Hume in 1962 at the Medical College of Virginia (MCV) in Richmond was eventually named after Hume and his mentee and successor, Dr. H.M. Lee. In 2002, the Hume-Lee Transplant Center continued as an important and historically significant part of MCV (now known as VCU Health System).

== David M. Hume Memorial Award ==
The David M. Hume Memorial Award is awarded annually by the National Kidney Foundation in the United States.
