= Continental IO-520 =

Family of flat-six piston aircraft engines

O-520
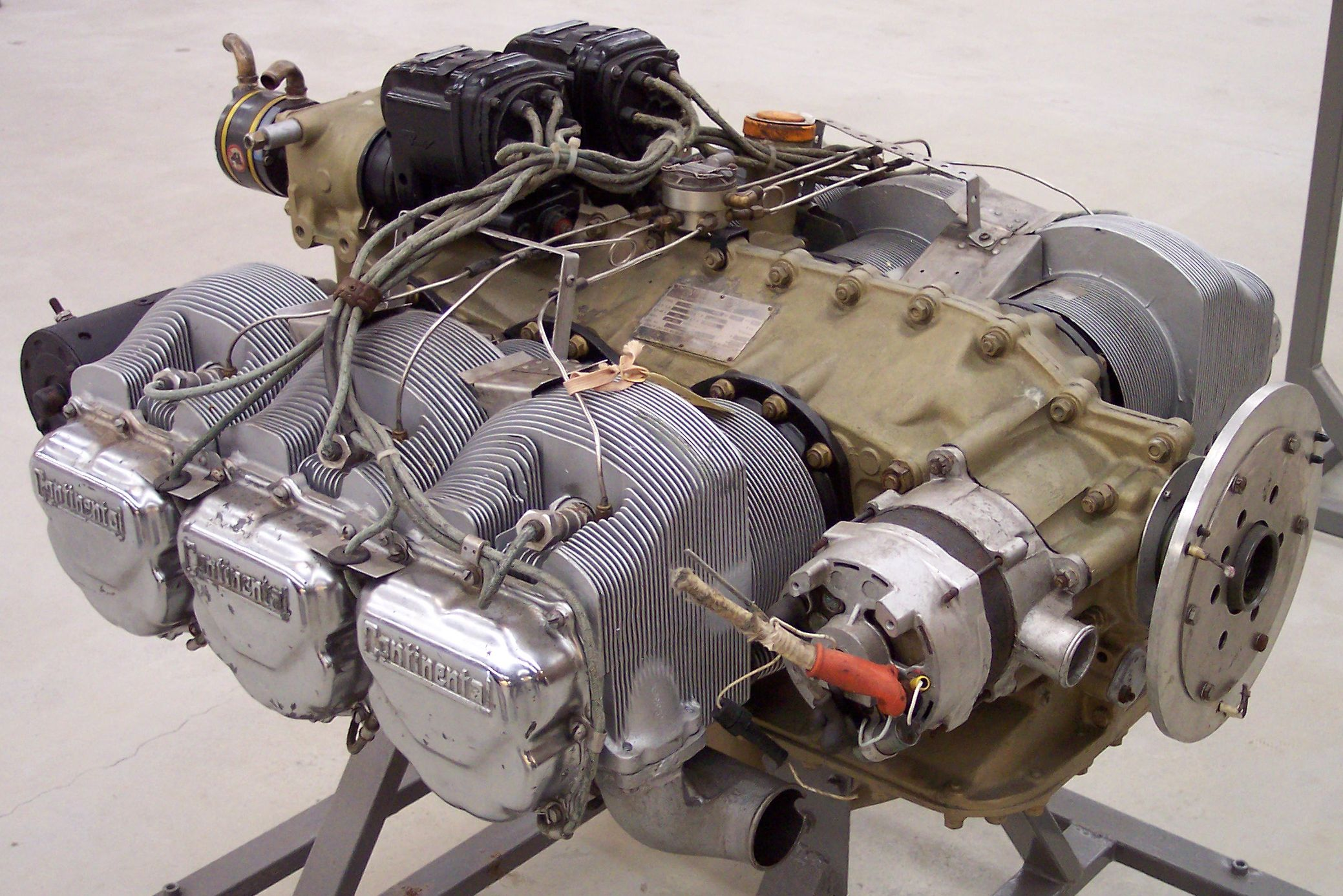
- Preserved IO-520
- Type: Piston aircraft engine
- National origin: United States
- Manufacturer: Teledyne Continental Motors
- First run: 1963
- Major applications: Beechcraft Bonanza; Beechcraft Baron; Cessna 205; Cessna 206; Cessna 210; Cessna 310; Cessna 340; Cessna 421
- Manufactured: 1964-present
- Developed from: Continental IO-346
- Developed into: Continental IO-550

The Continental IO-520 is a six-cylinder, horizontally opposed aircraft engine produced by Teledyne Continental Motors. First run in 1963 as a development of the IO-346, it has been produced in versions incorporating fuel injection (IO-520), turbo-charging (TSIO-520), and gearing (GTSIO-520).

== Design and development ==
The IO-520 series engines normally produce 285 to 310 horsepower (210 to 230 kW) and are used in numerous aircraft such as certain models of the Bellanca Viking 300 and Super Viking, the Beech Bonanza and Baron, and Cessna 185- 206-, 210-, 310-, and 400-series aircraft. The IO-520 remained in production in 2019.

The geared GTSIO-520's most common applications are the twin-engine Cessna 404 and 421, where it is rated at 375 hp (280 kW). The 'G' prefix indicated the incorporation of propeller reduction gearing.

== Variants ==
=== IO-520 ===
IO-520-A
285 hp (213 kW) (Meyers 200)
IO-520-B
285 hp (213 kW) (Beech 35-C33A Debonair, s35, model 36 Bonanza)
IO-520-BA
285 hp (213 kW) (Beech V35B(-TC), to 1974)
IO-520-BB
285 hp (213 kW) (Beech V35B(-TC), from 1975 on)
IO-520-C
285 hp (213 kW)
IO-520-CB
285 hp (213 kW)
IO-520-D
300 hp (224 kW)
IO-520-E
300 hp (224 kW)
IO-520-F
300 hp (224 kW)
IO-520-J
285 hp (213 kW)
IO-520-K
300 hp (224 kW) (Bellanca Viking)
IO-520-L
300 hp (224 kW)
IO-520-M
285 hp (213 kW)
IO-520-MB
285 hp (213 kW)
IO-520-N
300 hp (224 kW)
IO-520-NB
300 hp (224 kW)
L/IO-520-P
250 hp (186 kW)

=== TSIO-520 ===
TSIO-520-A
255 hp (190 kW)
TSIO-520-AE
250 hp (186 kW)
LTSIO-520-AE
250 hp (186 kW)
TSIO-520-AF
310 hp (231 kW)
TSIO-520-B
285 hp (213 kW)
TSIO-520-BB
285 hp (213 kW)
TSIO-520-BE
310 hp (231 kW)
TSIO-520-C
265 hp (198 kW)
TSIO-520-CE
325 hp (242 kW)
TSIO-520-D
285 hp (213 kW)
TSIO-520-DB
285 hp (213 kW)
TSIO-520-E
300 hp (224 kW)
TSIO-520-EB
300 hp (224 kW)
TSIO-520-G
285 hp (213 kW)
TSIO-520-H
265 hp (198 kW)
TSIO-520-J
310 hp (230 kW)
TSIO-520-JB
310 hp (230 kW)
TSIO-520-K
285 hp (213 kW)
TSIO-520-KB
285 hp (213 kW)
TSIO-520-L
310 hp (230 kW)
TSIO-520-LB
310 hp (230 kW)
TSIO-520-M
285 hp (213 kW)
TSIO-520-N
310 hp (230 kW)
TSIO-520-NB
310 hp (230 kW)
TSIO-520-P
310 hp (230 kW)
TSIO-520-R
310 hp (230 kW)
TSIO-520-T
310 hp (230 kW)
TSIO-520-U
300 hp (224 kW)
TSIO-520-UB
300 hp (224 kW)
TSIO-520-VB
325 hp (242 kW)
TSIO-520-WB
325 hp (242 kW)

=== GTSIO-520 ===
GTSIO-520-C
340 hp (254 kW) (Beech V35 Bonanza, conversion to V35TC)
GTSIO-520-D
375 hp (280 kW) (Cessna 421)
GTSIO-520-F
435 hp (324 kW)
GTSIO-520-H
375 hp (280 kW) (Cessna 421B)
GTSIO-520-K
435 hp (324 kW)
GTSIO-520-L
375 hp (280 kW) (Cessna 421C)
GTSIO-520-M
375 hp (280 kW) (Cessna 404)
GTSIO-520-N
375 hp (280 kW) (Cessna 421C)
GTSIO-520-S
375 hp (280 kW) (Tecnam P2012 Traveller)

== Applications ==
- Aero Commander 685
- Beagle B.206
- Beechcraft Bonanza
- Beechcraft Baron 58P
- Bellanca Skyrocket II
- Bellanca Viking (17-30 and 17-30A)
- Cessna 185
- Cessna 188
- Cessna 205
- Cessna 206
- Cessna 207
- Cessna 210
- Cessna 303
- Cessna 310
- Cessna 335
- Cessna 340
- Cessna 402
- Cessna 404
- Cessna 414
- Cessna 421
- Meyers 200D
- Navion H Rangemaster
- Piper PA-46-310P Malibu
- St-Just Super-Cyclone
- Tecnam P2012 Traveller
- Viper Aircraft Viperfan
- Wise GT-400

== Specifications (GTSIO-520-D) ==
Data from Continental Motors.

=== General characteristics ===
- Type: 6-cylinder horizontally opposed aircraft engine
- Bore: 5.25 in (133 mm)
- Stroke: 4.00 in (102 mm)
- Displacement: 520 cu in (8.5 L)
- Length: 63.63 in (161.6 cm)
- Width: 34.04 in (86.5 cm)
- Height: 26.63 in (67.6 cm)
- Dry weight: 484 lb (219.5 kg) without accessories

=== Components ===
- Valvetrain: Overhead valve
- Fuel system: TCM fuel injection
- Fuel type: 100/130 Octane avgas
- Cooling system: Air-cooled

=== Performance ===
- Power output: 375 hp (280 kW) (Maximum continuous operation at 3,400 rpm)
- Compression ratio: 7.5:1
- Power-to-weight ratio: 0.77 hp/lb (1.27kW/kg)

== See also ==
- List of aircraft engines
