= Neil Burgess =

Neil Burgess may refer to:

- Neil Burgess (comedian) (1846–1910), American vaudevillian comedian
- Neil Burgess (neuroscientist) (born 1966), professor at University College London
- Neil Burgess Jr. (1918–1997), American aircraft propulsion engineer and designer
- Neil Burgess, actor known for Cillit Bang adverts
