= GCAS =

GCAS may refer to:

- Gamma Cassiopeiae variable, a type of variable star
- Global Center for Advanced Studies, an educational and research institution located in Dublin, Ireland.
- Global Climate Action Summit, a 2018 climate change conference
- Groundcrewman aircraft support, a branch of the Australian Army Aviation Corps
- Ground Collision Avoidance System, a safety system for aircraft
