= Collier Trophy =

Annual aviation award administered by the US National Aeronautical Association

Robert J. Collier Trophy
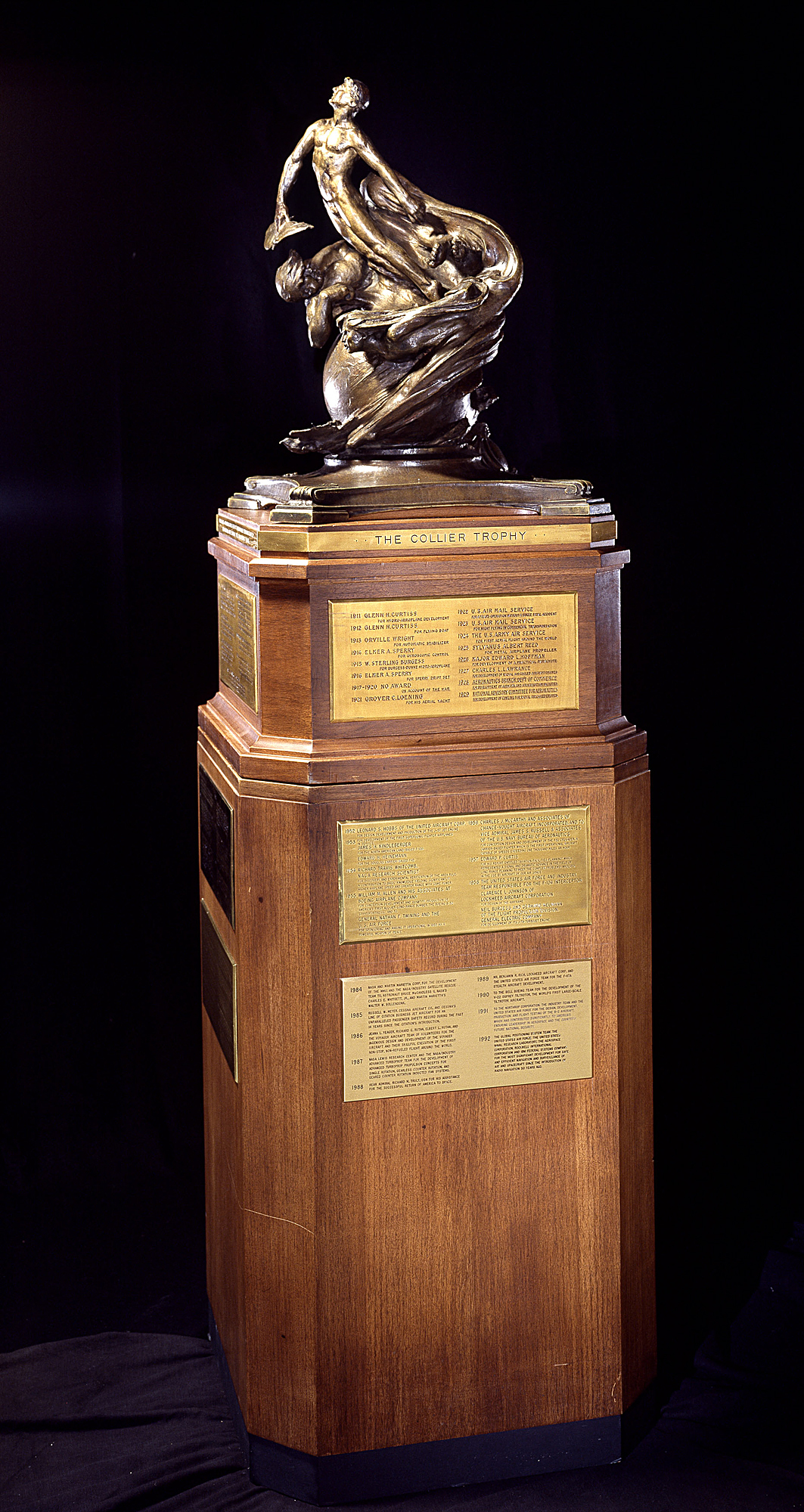
- Awarded for: "the greatest achievement in aeronautics or astronautics in America, with respect to improving the performance, efficiency, and safety of air or space vehicles, the value of which has been thoroughly demonstrated by actual use during the preceding year."
- Country: United States
- Presented by: National Aeronautic Association (NAA)
- First award: 1911; 115 years ago
- Website: naa.aero/awards/awards-trophies/collier-trophy/

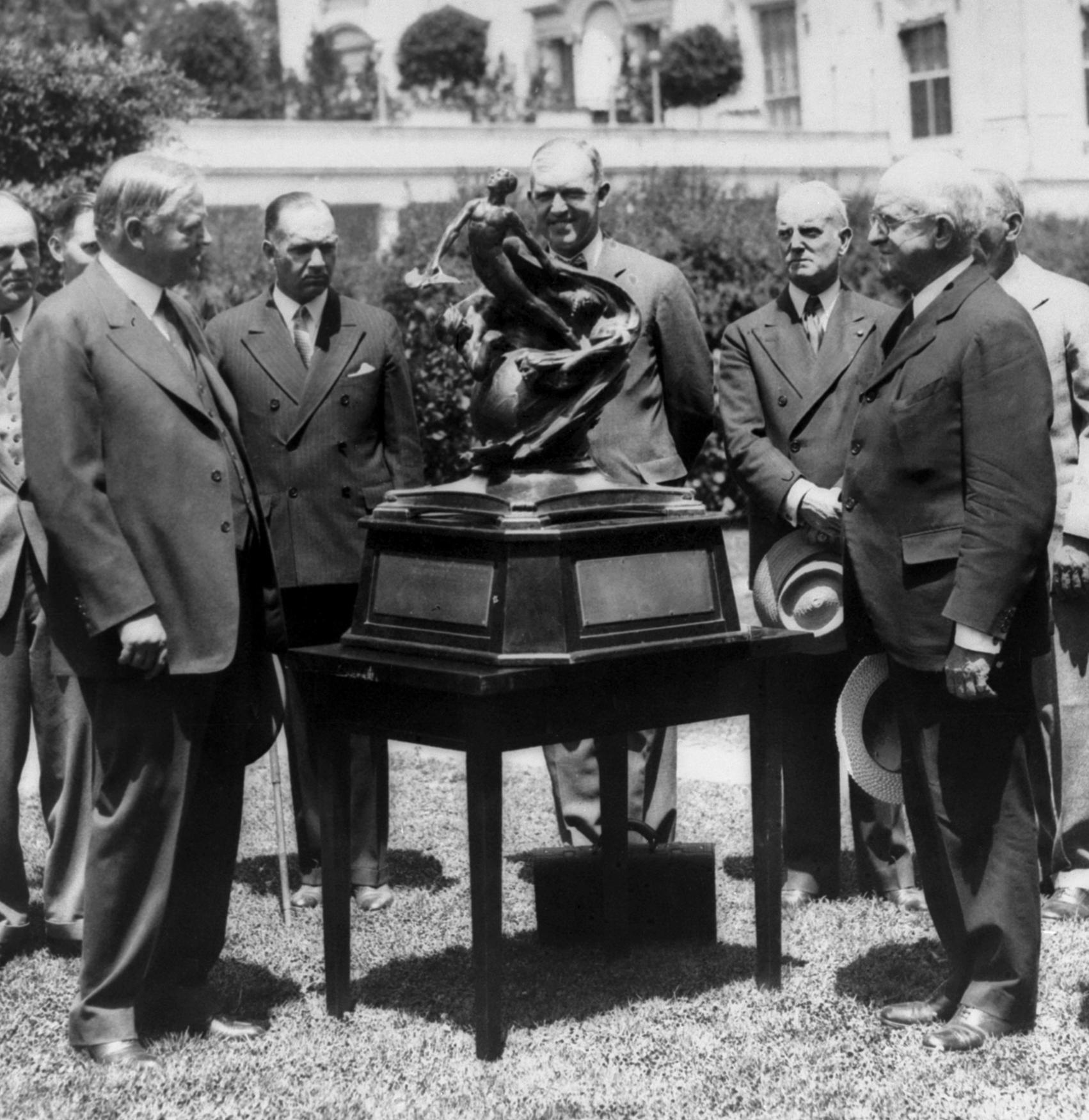
Herbert Hoover presents the 1929 Collier Trophy to NACA Chairman Joseph Ames for the NACA cowling.

The Robert J. Collier Trophy is awarded annually "for the greatest achievement in aeronautics or astronautics in America, with respect to improving the performance, efficiency, and safety of air or space vehicles, the value of which has been thoroughly demonstrated by actual use during the preceding year".

The Collier Trophy is administered by the National Aeronautic Association (NAA) the oldest national aviation organization in the United States. Founded in 1905, the NAA oversees America's oldest and most prestigious aviation and aerospace recognitions. The Collier Trophy is the most coveted of all.

Robert J. Collier, publisher of Collier's Weekly magazine, was an air sports pioneer and president of the Aero Club of America. In 1910, he commissioned the Baltimore sculptor Ernest Wise Keyser to make the 525-pound (238 kg) Aero Club of America Trophy. It was first awarded in 1911 to Glenn H. Curtiss for his successful development of the hydro-aeroplane. Collier presented his namesake trophy several times before his death in 1918.

The award is presented once a year by the NAA president, with the trophy on permanent display at the National Air and Space Museum.

The trophy was stolen briefly in 1978, but was recovered. The thieves left it at Fort Foote park and it was recovered 26 hours from the time it went missing.

== Recipients ==
- 1911 – Glenn H. Curtiss, for successful development of the hydro-aeroplane. The first award.
- 1912 – Glenn H. Curtiss, for the invention of the single-pontoon seaplane and development of the flying boat.
- 1913 – Orville Wright, for development of his automatic stabilizer.
- 1914 – Elmer Sperry and Lawrence Sperry, for the invention of gyroscopic control.
- 1915 – W. Starling Burgess, for the Burgess-Dunne BD series of semi-flying wing seaplanes.
- 1916 – Elmer Sperry and Lawrence Sperry for the invention of a drift indicator
- 1917–1920 – No trophy awarded due to the war
- 1921 – Grover Loening, for development of the Loening Flying Yacht.
- 1922 – United States Air Mail Service, for the first transcontinental air mail route without a single fatal accident.
- 1923 – United States Air Mail Service, for the first transcontinental air mail route involving night flight.
- 1924 – United States Army Air Service, for first aerial flight around the world.
- 1925 – Sylvanus Albert Reed, for the metal propeller.
- 1926 – Major Edward L. Hoffman of the United States Army Air Service for the development of a practical parachute.
- 1927 – Charles L. Lawrance, for the development of the air-cooled aircraft radial engine.
- 1928 – Aeronautics Branch of the United States Department of Commerce for development of airways and navigation facilities.
- 1929 – National Advisory Committee for Aeronautics (NACA), for design of the NACA cowling for radial air-cooled engines.

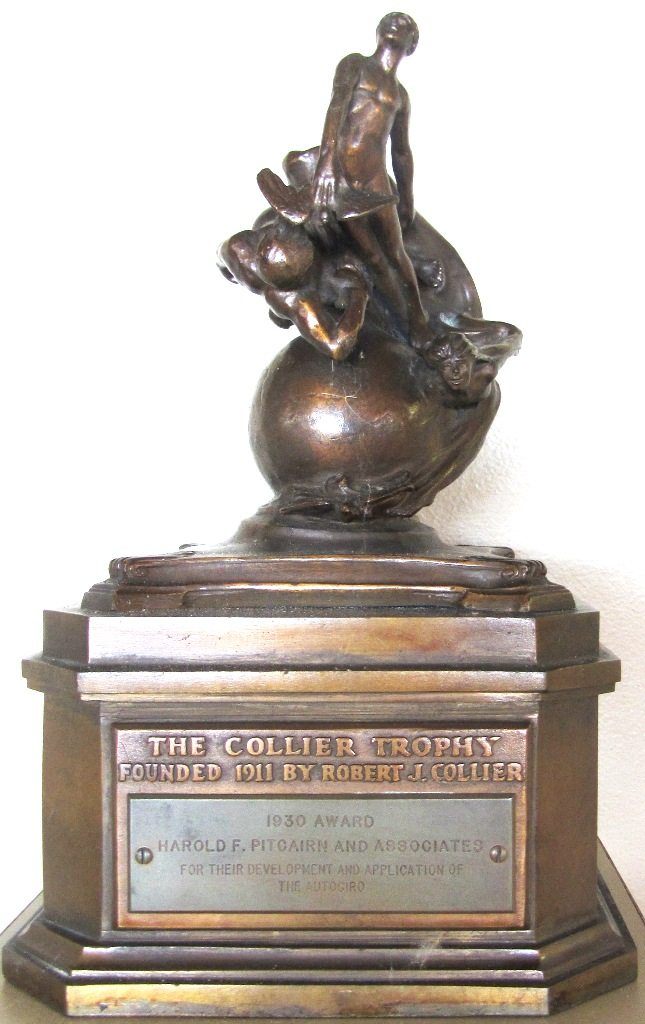
1930 Collier Trophy for Pitcairn's autogyro

- 1930 – Harold Frederick Pitcairn and associates for development of the autogyro.
- 1931 – Packard Motor Car Co. for the design/development of the first, practical diesel aircraft engine, the DR-980 radial engine.
- 1932 – Glenn L. Martin for the design of the Martin B-10 (XB-907) bomber.
- 1933 – Frank W. Caldwell of Hamilton Standard for the hydraulically controllable propeller.
- 1934 – Captain A. F. Hegenberger USAAC for the first blind flying landing system.
- 1935 – Donald W. Douglas and his technical and production personnel for the outstanding twin-engine transport airliner.
- 1936 – Pan American Airways for establishment of a transpacific airline and the successful execution of extended overwater navigation in regular operations.
- 1937 – Army Air Corps for the design and development of the Lockheed XC-35.
- 1938 – Howard Hughes and his associates for breaking the record time by flying around the world in 91 hours and 14 minutes.
- 1939 – Airlines of the US safety record, with special recognition to Walter Boothby, Randolph Lovelace, and Harry Armstrong.
- 1940 – Dr. Sanford A. Moss and the Army Air Corps for development of the turbo-supercharger.
- 1941 – Army Air Corps and the Airlines of the US for pioneering worldwide air transportation vital to immediate defense.
- 1942 – General Henry Arnold for his "organization and leadership of the Army Air Forces throughout the world".
- 1943 – Captain Luis de Florez, United States Navy Reserve for his contribution to the safe and rapid training of combat pilots and crews.
- 1944 – Carl Spaatz "for demonstrating the air power concept through employment of American aviation in the war against Germany".
- 1945 – Luis W. Alvarez for the Ground Controlled Approach (GCA) which allowed radar operators to guide pilots to a safe landing in all weather conditions.
- 1946 – Lewis A. Rodert of NACA, for the design and development of an aircraft anti-icing system.
- 1947 – Lawrence Bell, John Stack, Chuck Yeager shared the award for their work on the Bell X-1, the first aircraft to break the sound barrier.
- 1948 – The Radio Technical Commission for Aeronautics for developing an air traffic control system.
- 1949 – William Lear for the development of the F-5 automatic pilot and automatic approach control coupler system.
- 1950 – The Helicopter Industry, the Military Services, and the Coast Guard – for development and use of rotary-wing aircraft for air rescue operations.
- 1951 – John Stack for the NACA Langley transonic wind tunnel.
- 1952 – Leonard S. Hobbs of United Aircraft Corp., for the design, development, and production of the Pratt & Whitney J57 jet engine.
- 1953 – James H. Kindelberger for North American Aviation's F-100 and Edward H. Heinemann for Douglas aircraft carrier based F4D.
- 1954 – Richard T. Whitcomb for his discovery of the area rule, a design method for supersonic aircraft.
- 1955 – Boeing's William M. Allen and General Nathan F. Twining USAF for the development, production, and operation of the B-52.
- 1956 – Charles J. McCarthy of Chance-Vaught Aircraft and Vice Admiral James S. Russell U.S. Navy Bureau of Aeronautics for the F-8U Crusader the first operational aircraft capable of speeds exceeding 1,000 miles per hour (1,600 km/h).
- 1957 – Edward P. Curtis for "Aviation Facilities Planning", the long-range planning addressing problems with aircraft, air space, and facilities.
- 1958 – Clarence "Kelly" Johnson of Lockheed Skunk Works, and Gerhard Neumann and Neil Burgess of GE, for leadership in the development of the F-104 Starfighter and its J79 engine.
- 1959 – US Air Force, Convair Division of General Dynamics, and Space Technology Laboratories for the development of the Atlas missile
- 1960 – Vice Adm William F Raborn for directing the creation of the Polaris fleet ballistic missile system.
- 1961 – North American Aviation with Scott Crossfield, Joseph A. Walker, Robert Michael White and Forrest S. Petersen, X-15 test pilots.
- 1962 – Mercury Seven, group of first seven astronauts.
- 1963 – Clarence "Kelly" Johnson, for his leadership at Lockheed's Skunk Works in the development of the A-12 Mach 3 aircraft.
- 1964 – Curtis LeMay "for development of high performance aircraft, missiles and space systems".
- 1965 – James E. Webb and Hugh L. Dryden for the Project Gemini.
- 1966 – James McDonnell for development work in aeronautics and astronautics, specifically on the F-4 Phantom and Project Gemini space vehicles.
- 1967 – Lawrence "Pat" Hyland of Hughes Aircraft's Surveyor program for placing the eyes, ears & hand of the United States on the Moon.
- 1968 – Apollo 8 crew: Col. Frank Borman, USAF; Capt. James A. Lovell Jr., USN; Lt. Col. William A. Anders, USAF for the first lunar orbit.
- 1969 – Apollo 11 crew: Neil A. Armstrong, COL. Edwin E. Aldrin Jr., USAF; COL. Michael Collins, USAF for the first landing of man on the surface of the Moon, July 20, 1969.
- 1970 – The Boeing Company for their introduction of the Boeing 747.
- 1971 – David Scott, James Irwin, Alfred Worden, and Robert Gilruth of the Apollo 15 mission.
- 1972 – The Officers and Men of the 7th Air Force and 8th Air Force of the United States Air Force and Task Force 77 of the United States Navy for Operation Linebacker II.
- 1973 – William C. Schneider and crews of the Skylab program
- 1974 – John F. Clark of NASA and Daniel J. Fink of GE, representing NASA's Earth Resources Technology Satellite Program, LANDSAT for mankind's management of the Earth's resources and with recognition to Hughes Aircraft Company and RCA.
- 1975 – David S. Lewis Jr. of General Dynamics Corporation and the F-16 Air Force Industry Team.
- 1976 – USAF and Rockwell International Corporation for the highly successful design, development, management, and flight test of the B-1 strategic aircraft system.
- 1977 – Robert J. Dixon for his work on Red Flag.
- 1978 – Sam B. Williams for development of the small, high-efficiency turbofan.
- 1979 – Paul MacCready for the MacCready Gossamer Albatross piloted by Bryan Allen made the first man-powered flight across the English Channel.
- 1980 – Edward C. Stone representing the Voyager mission team's fly-by of Saturn.
- 1981 – NASA, Rockwell International, Martin Marietta, and Thiokol for the development of crewed reusable spacecraft noting astronauts John Young, Robert Crippen, Joe Engle and Richard Truly.
- 1982 – Thornton "T" Arnold Wilson and The Boeing Company for the Boeing 757 and the 767.
- 1983 – The United States Army and Hughes Aircraft Helicopters for advanced weapons systems for the AH-64A Apache.
- 1984 – Bruce McCandless and Charles E. Whitsett of NASA and Walter W. Bollendonk of Martin Marietta for their work on satellite rescue and repair.
- 1985 – Russell W Meyer and Cessna Aircraft for the outstanding safety record of the Cessna Citation aircraft.
- 1986 – Dick Rutan, Jeana Yeager, Burt Rutan and the team of the first non-stop unrefueled circumnavigation of the Rutan Voyager.
- 1987 – NASA Lewis Research Center and the NASA/industry advanced turboprop team for their work in new turboprop technologies.
- 1988 – Rear Admiral Richard H. Truly U.S. Navy for the successful return of America to space after the Space Shuttle Challenger disaster.
- 1989 – Ben Rich of Lockheed and USAF team for the first stealth aircraft, the F-117.
- 1990 – Bell Boeing V-22 Osprey team for the first large tiltrotor aircraft.
- 1991 – The Northrop Corporation, the Industry Team and the United States Air Force for the Northrop Grumman B-2 Spirit.
- 1992 – Naval Research Laboratory, US Air Force, Aerospace Corporation, Rockwell International, and IBM Federal Systems Company for Global Positioning System (GPS).
- 1993 – The Hubble Space Telescope Recovery Team for the recovery and repair of the Hubble Space Telescope.
- 1994 – McDonnell Douglas, US Air Force, and US Army for developing and producing the C-17 Globemaster III.
- 1995 – Boeing Commercial Airplanes for producing the Boeing 777.
- 1996 – Cessna Aircraft Company for producing the Citation X the US's first commercial aircraft to cruise at .92 Mach.
- 1997 – Gulfstream Aerospace for producing the ultra-long range business jet the Gulfstream V.
- 1998 – Lockheed Martin, GE Aircraft Engines, NASA, Air Combat Command, and Defense Intelligence Agency for the U-2S/ER-2 high altitude, all-weather, multi-functional data collection aircraft.
- 1999 – Boeing, GE Aircraft Engines, Northrop Grumman, Raytheon Technologies, and United States Navy for the F/A-18E/F multi-mission strike fighter aircraft.
- 2000 – Northrop Grumman, Rolls-Royce, Raytheon, L-3 Communications, United States Air Force, and DARPA for the Northrop Grumman RQ-4 Global Hawk.
- 2001 – Pratt and Whitney, Lockheed Martin, Rolls-Royce, BAE Systems, Northrop Grumman and the Joint Strike Fighter program Office for LiftFan Propulsion System.
- 2002 – Sikorsky Aircraft and the S-92 team, led by Nicholas Lappos.
- 2003 – Gulfstream Aerospace for the development of the G550, the first civil aircraft to include an enhanced vision system as standard equipment.
- 2004 – Burt Rutan, Paul Allen, Doug Shane, Mike Melvill, Brian Binnie, and the SpaceShipOne team for the first privately designed, funded, built, and flown commercial crewed space-launch vehicle.
- 2005 – Eclipse Aviation for producing the Eclipse 500, the world's first very light jet.
- 2006 – United States Air Force, Lockheed Martin, BAE Systems, Boeing, Northrop Grumman, Raytheon, and Pratt and Whitney for producing the F-22 Raptor.
- 2007 – Automatic Dependent Surveillance-broadcast (ADS-B) team that includes AOPA, ALPA, CAA, ERAU, FAA, ITT, Lockheed Martin, NASA, MITRE, UPS, and ACSS for supporting NextGen.
- 2008 – The Commercial Aviation Safety Team (CAST) for reducing commercial scheduled airline fatalities.
- 2009 – The International Space Station team including NASA, Boeing, Draper Laboratory, Honeywell, Lockheed Martin, United Launch Alliance, United Technologies for the world's largest spacecraft.
- 2010 – The Sikorsky Aircraft Corp. Sikorsky X2 Technology Demonstrator team for revolutionary helicopter development.
- 2011 – The Boeing Company for designing, building, delivering, and supporting the 787 Dreamliner.
- 2012 – NASA/JPL Mars Science Laboratory/Curiosity project team for their successful Mars mission.
- 2013 – Northrop Grumman/U.S. Navy/Industry team for designing, building, and demonstrating the X-47B; and for the aircraft's ability to autonomously operate from and perform arrested landings upon an aircraft carrier.
- 2014 – Gulfstream Aerospace for producing the G650.
- 2015 – The NASA-JPL Dawn Mission team for orbiting and exploring protoplanet Vesta and dwarf planet Ceres.
- 2016 – The Blue Origin team for demonstrating rocket booster reusability with the New Shepard human spaceflight vehicle.
- 2017 – Cirrus Aircraft for designing, certifying, and entering-into-service the SF50 Vision, the first single-engine personal jet; and for their inclusion of the Cirrus Airframe Parachute System (CAPS) on the aircraft.
- 2018 – The Automatic Ground Collision Avoidance System (Auto-GCAS) team, which includes the Air Force Research Laboratory, Lockheed Martin, the F-35 Joint Program Office, and NASA for lifesaving technology.
- 2019 – The USAF-Boeing X-37B Orbital Test Vehicle Team for developing and employing the world's only reusable, autonomous spaceplane.
- 2020 – Garmin for designing, developing, and fielding Garmin Autoland – the world's first certified autonomous system that activates during an emergency to safely control and land an aircraft without human intervention.
- 2021 – The NASA/JPL/Ingenuity team for the first powered, controlled flight of an aircraft on another planet, thereby opening the skies of Mars and other worlds for future scientific discovery and exploration.
- 2022 – NASA and Northrop Grumman for the James Webb Space Telescope "for its unprecedented discovery mission to explore, identify and photograph what lies beyond what is currently known and to seek what is unknown".
- 2023 – NASA, Lockheed Martin, the University of Arizona and KinetX for OSIRIS-REx, the first American mission to gather an asteroid sample and its return to earth
- 2024 – NASA and the Johns Hopkins Applied Physics Laboratory for the Parker Solar Probe, which ventured into the Sun's corona passing 3.83 million mi (6.16 million km) from the solar surface, closer than any previous spacecraft, and setting a record for the fastest human-made object at a speed of 430,000 mph (690,000 km/h).
- 2025 – Firefly Aerospace's Blue Ghost Mission 1 team for completing the first fully successful commercial lunar landing.

== Gallery ==
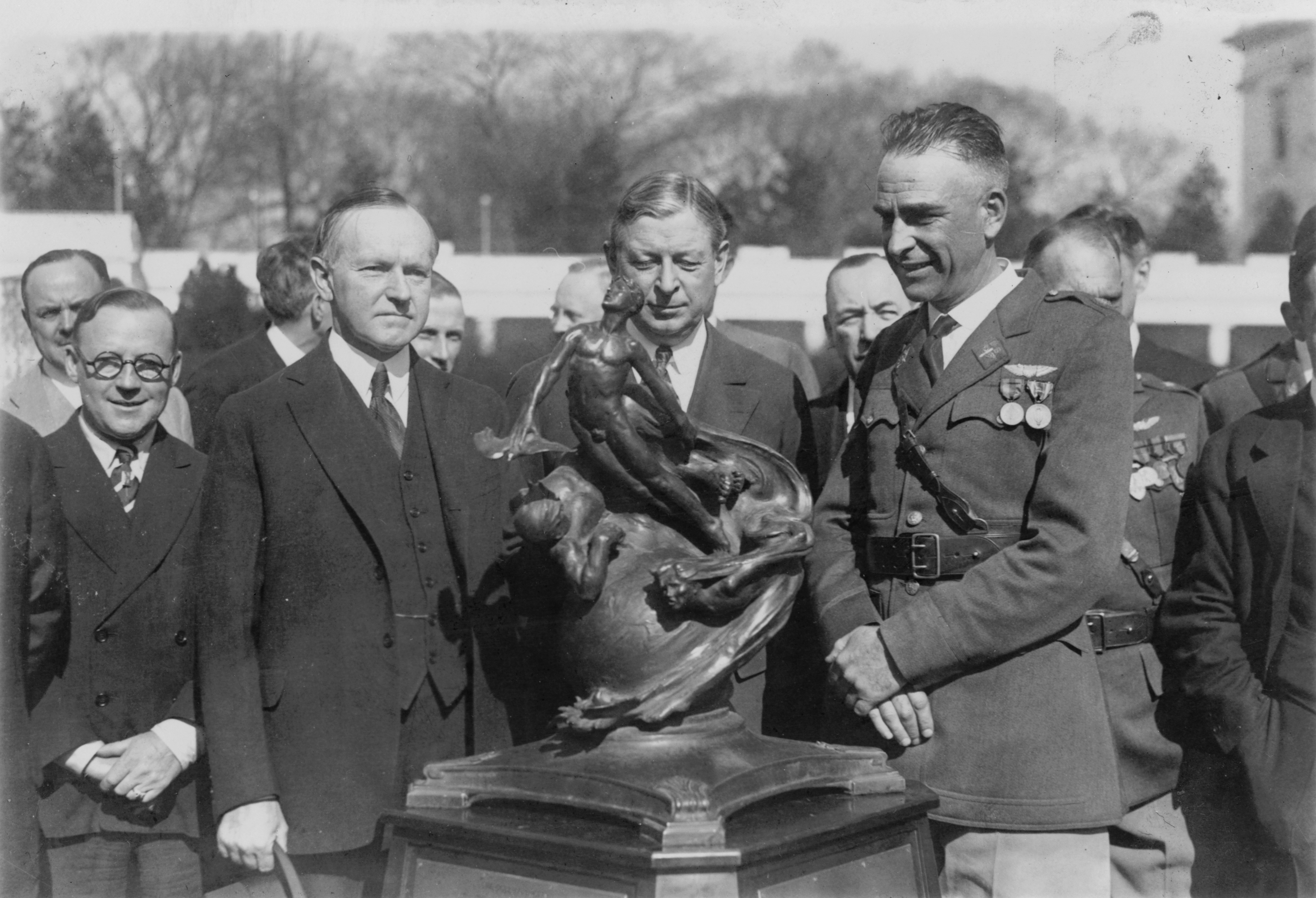
1926 Collier Trophy President Calvin Coolidge presented to Edward L. Hoffman for the modern freefall parachute

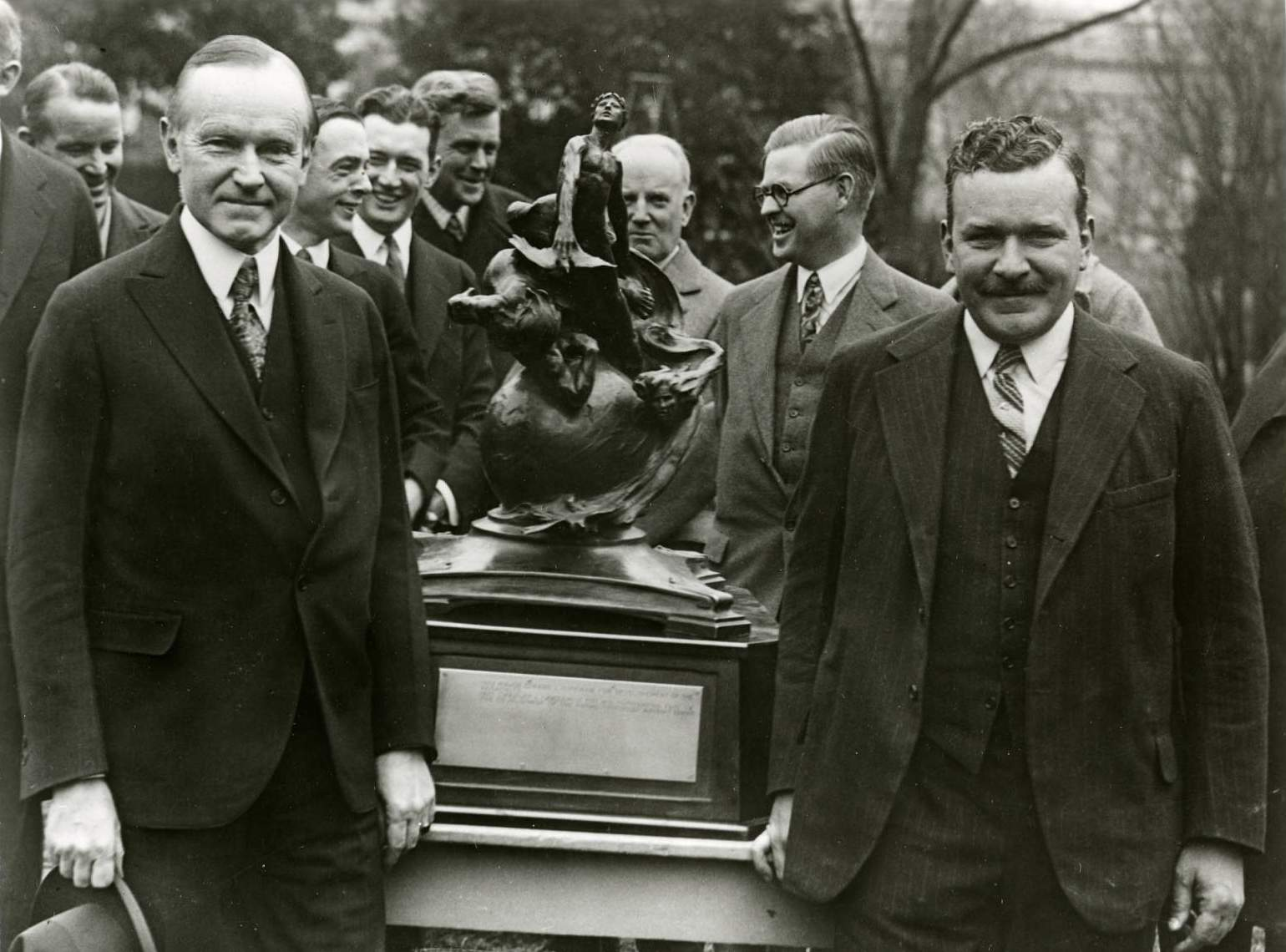
1927 Collier Trophy President Coolidge presented to Charles Lawrance for the air-cooled aircraft radial engine

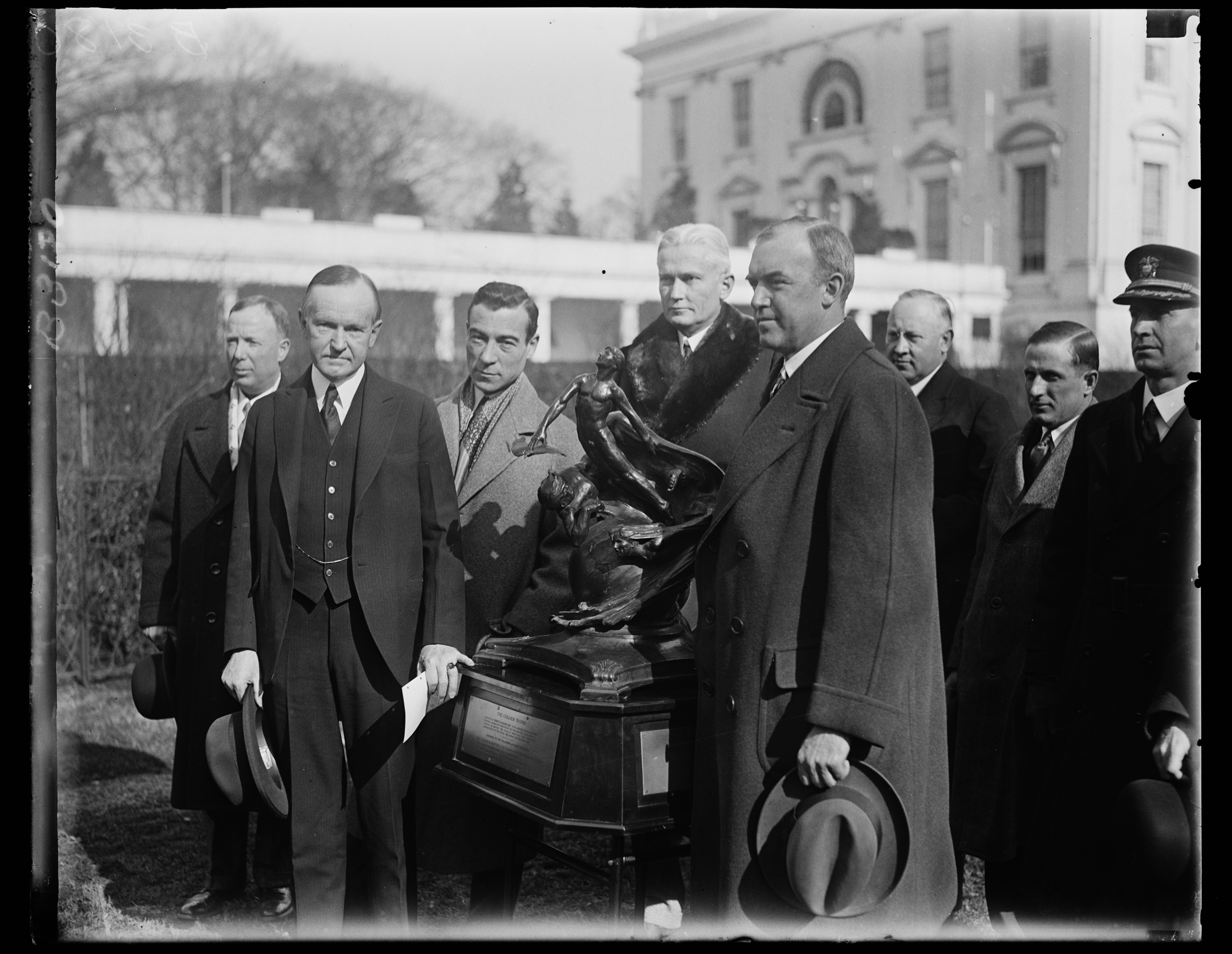
1928 Collier Trophy is awarded to the United States Department of Commerce. Assistant Secretary of Commerce for Aviation, William McCracken (right) receiving from President Coolidge.

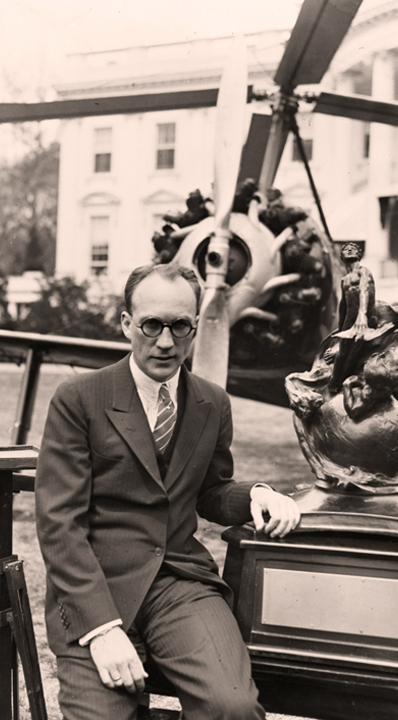
1930 Collier Trophy recipient Harold Frederick Pitcairn for the autogyro

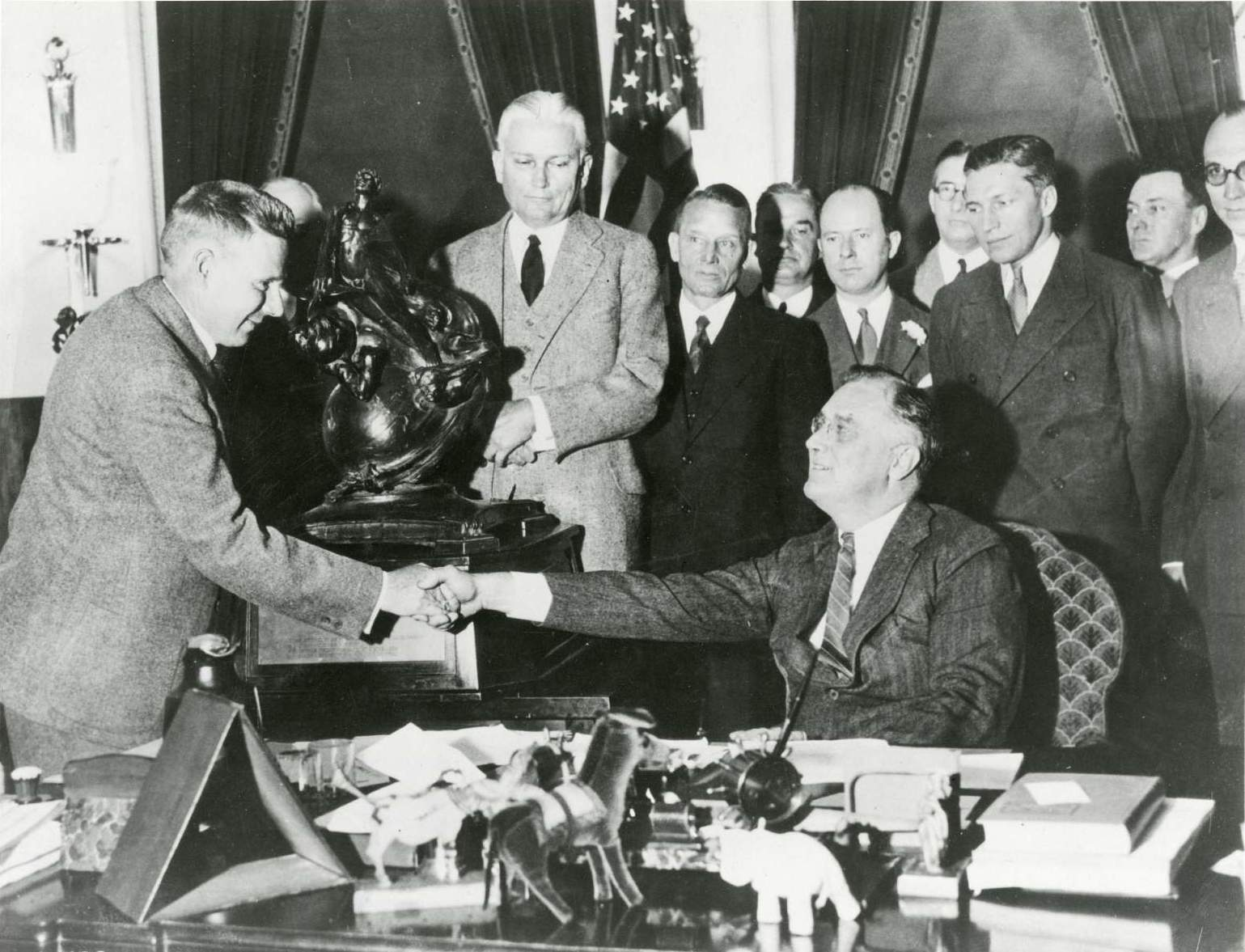
1933 Collier Trophy President Roosevelt congratulates Frank W. Caldwell of Hamilton Standard for the controllable-pitch propeller

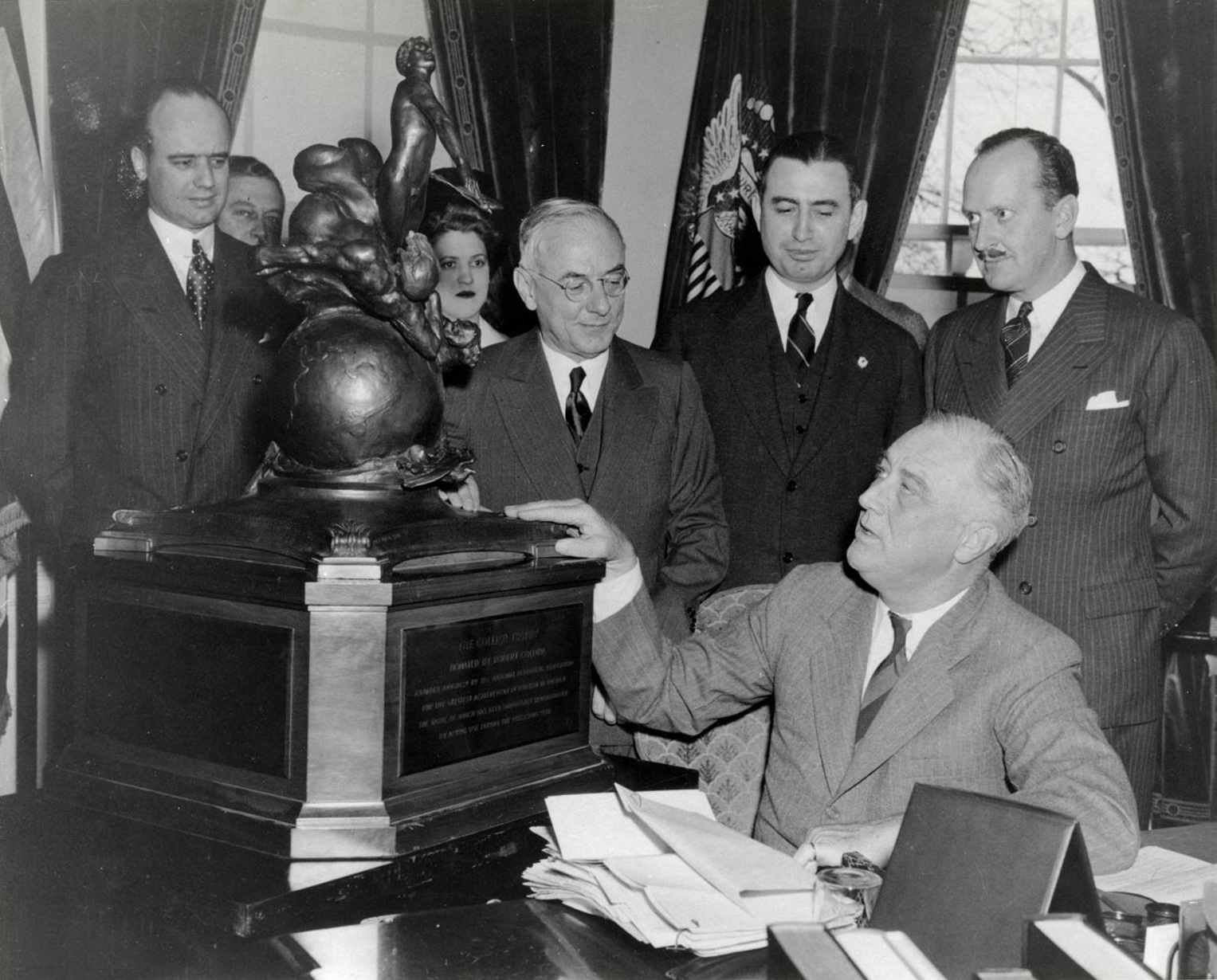
1939 Collier Trophy President Roosevelt congratulates US airlines Dr. Walter Meredith Boothby, William Randolph Lovelace II, and Harry George Armstrong

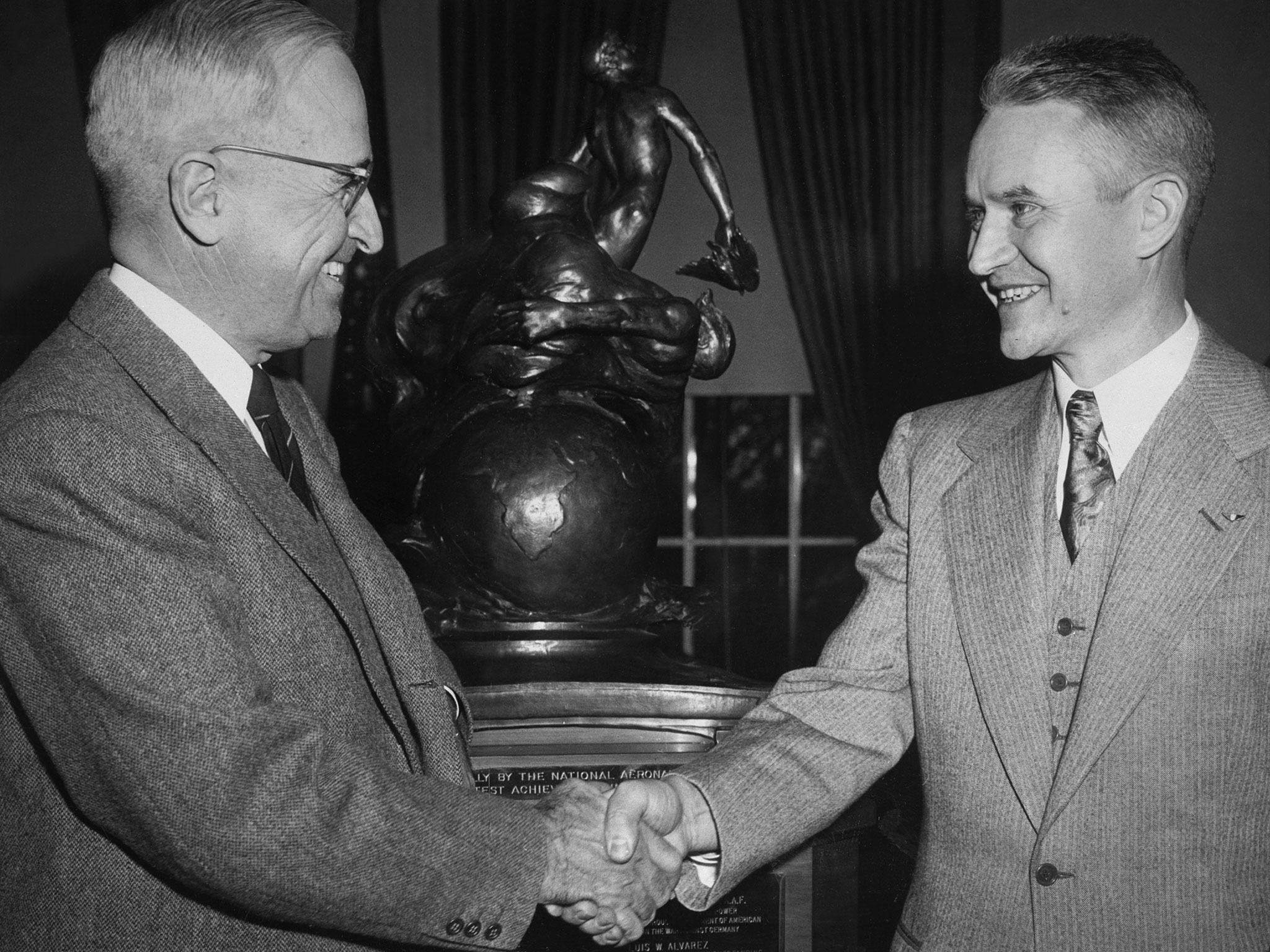
1946 Collier Trophy President Truman congratulates Lewis A. Rodert for the thermal aircraft anti-icing

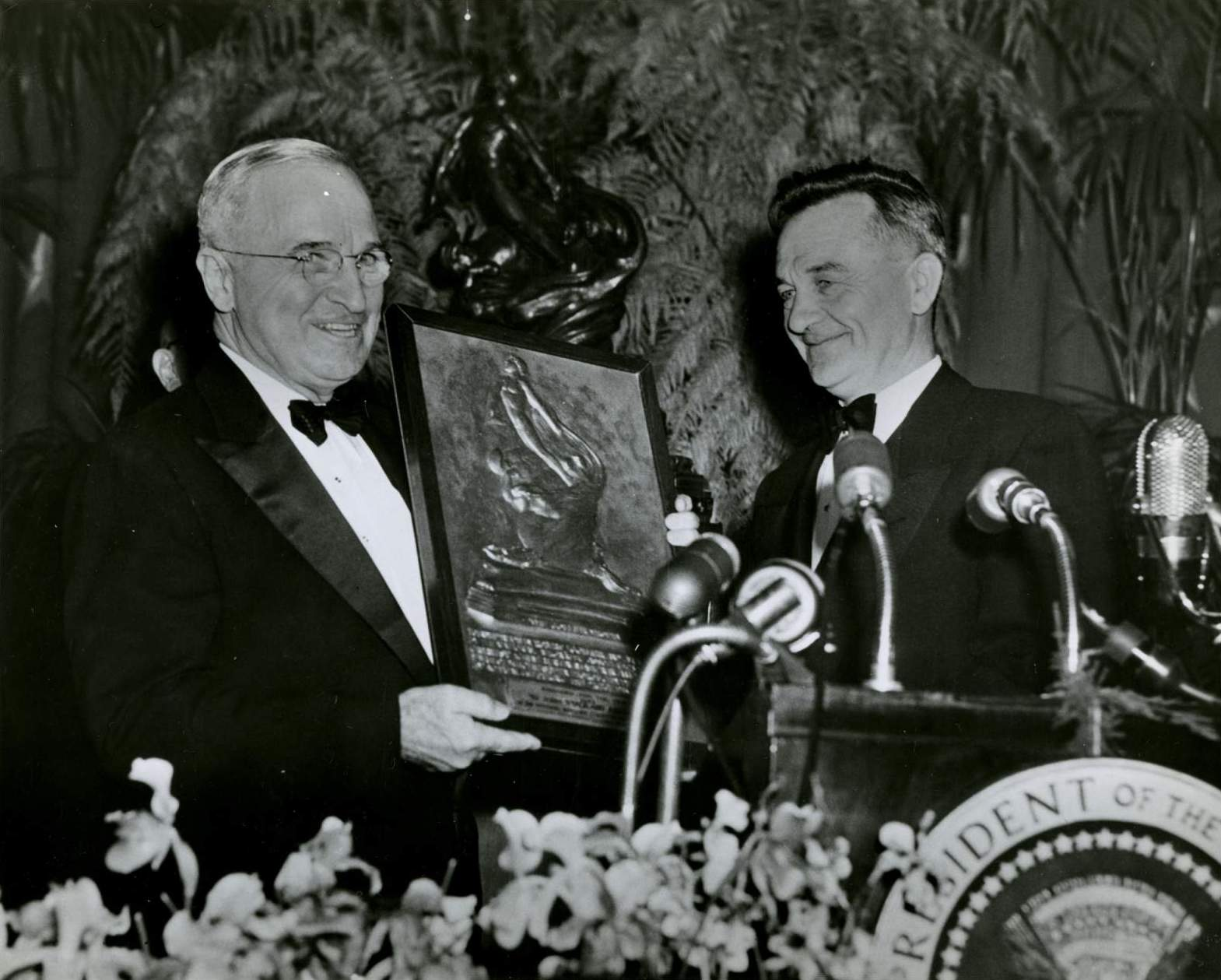
1952 Collier Trophy President Truman congratulates John Stack for the Langley transonic wind tunnel

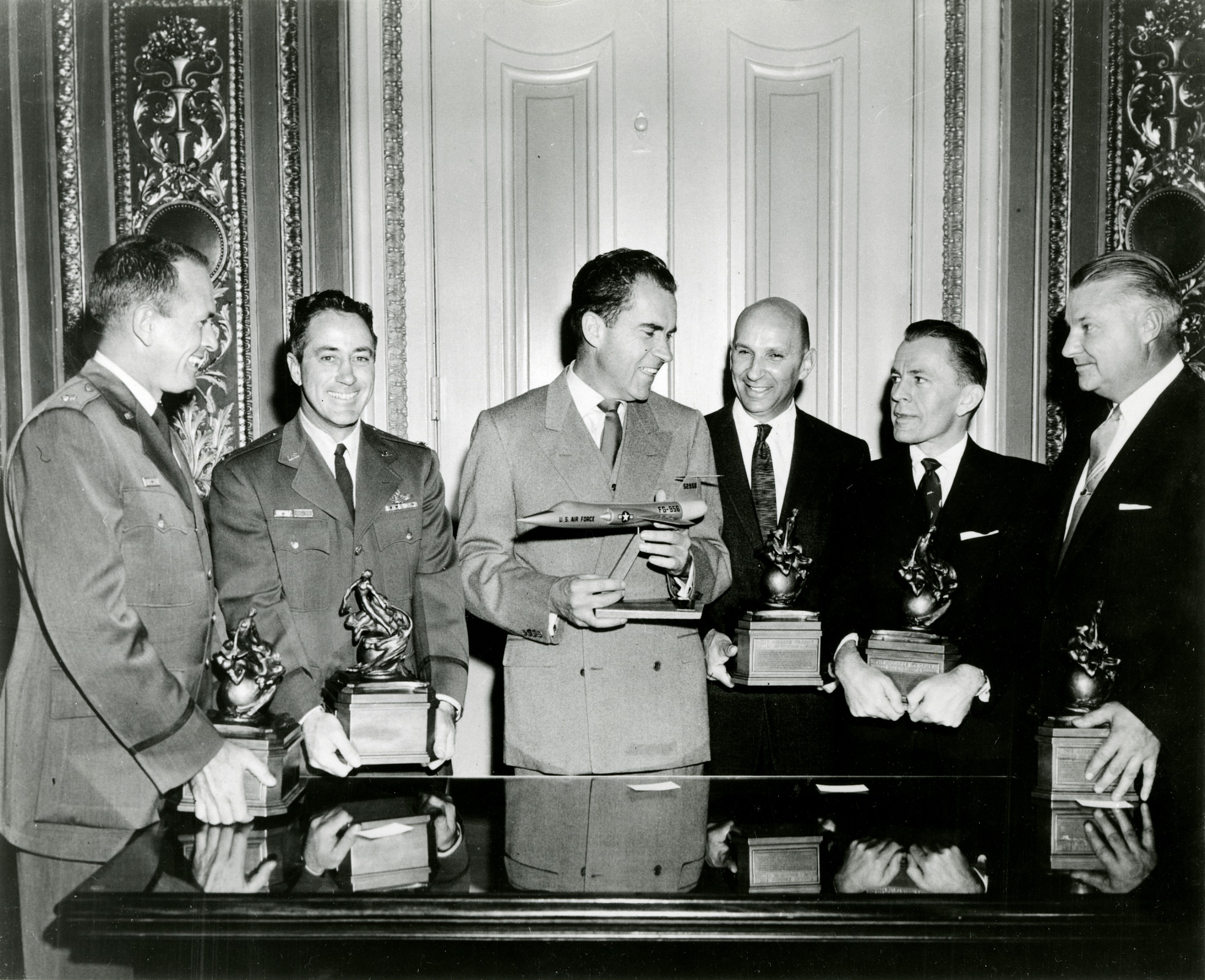
1958 Collier Trophy with (L to R) Walter W. Irwin, Howard C. Johnson, US VP Nixon, Gerhard Neumann, Neil Burgess, Clarence Leonard "Kelly" Johnson

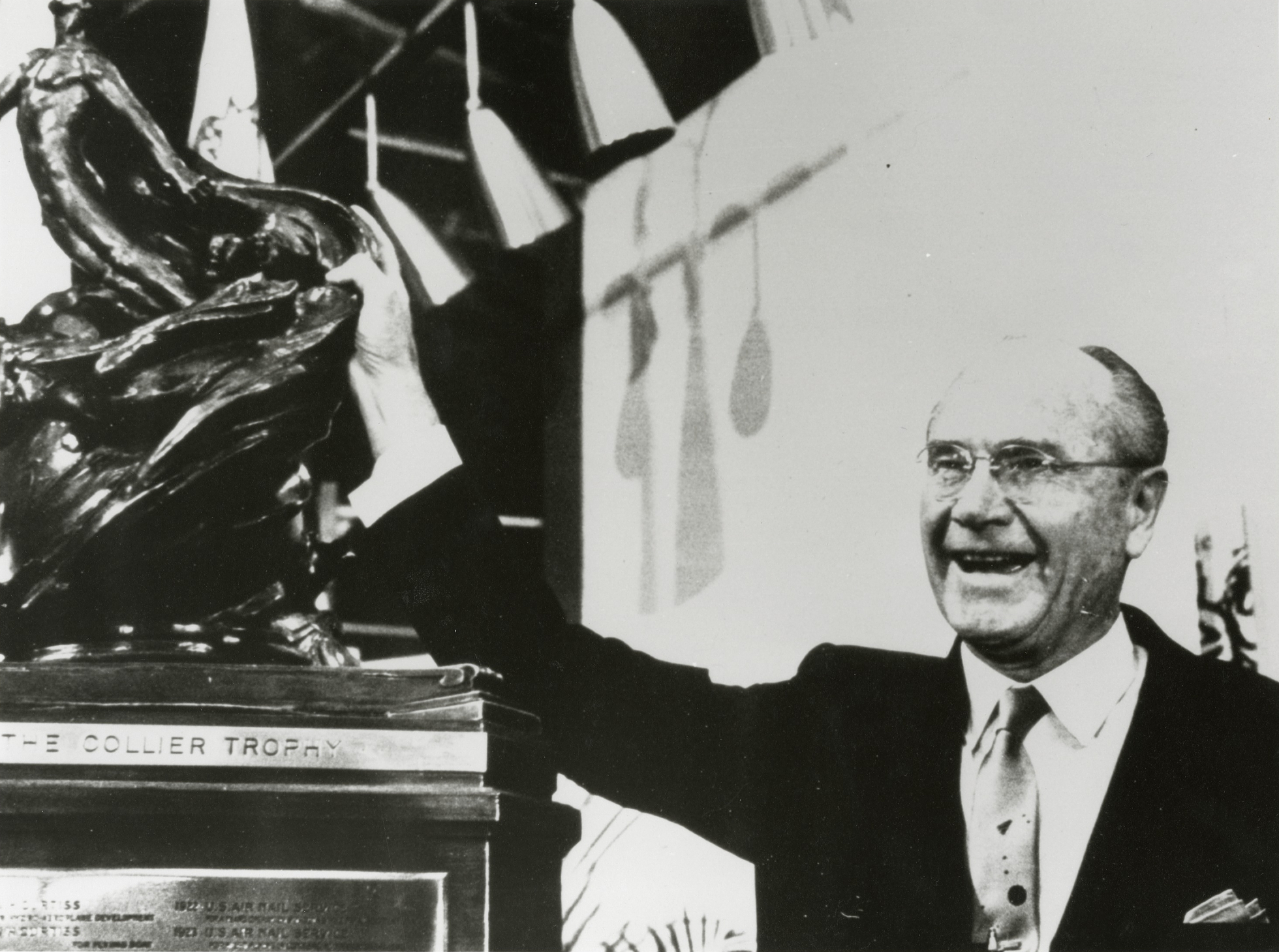
1966 Collier Trophy with James Smith McDonnell Jr. founder of McDonnell Aircraft Corporation for the F-4 Phantom and Project Gemini

1973 Collier Trophy VP Ford congratulates NASA Skylab Program Director William C. Schneider

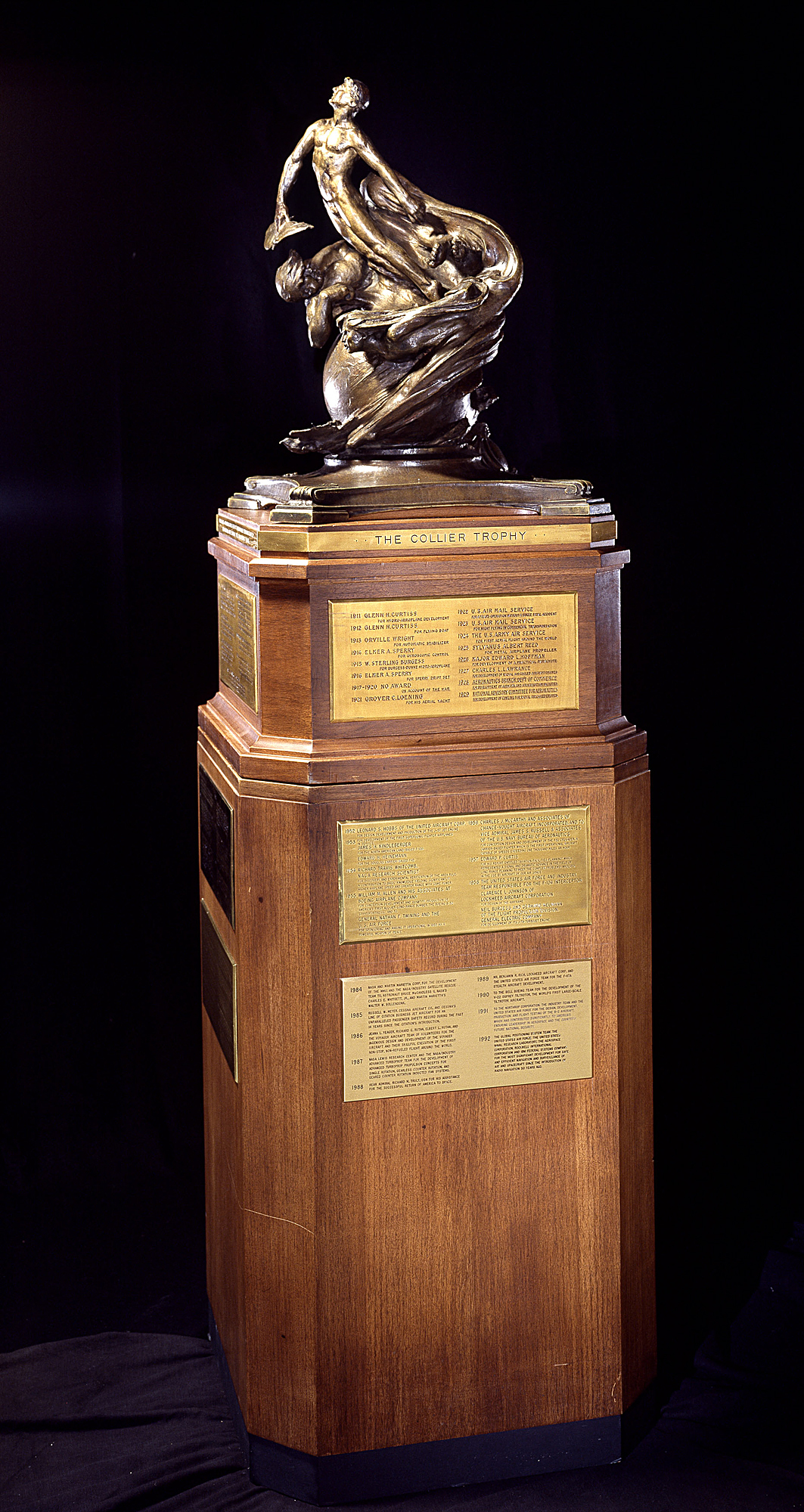
1992 Collier Trophy for the Global Positioning System

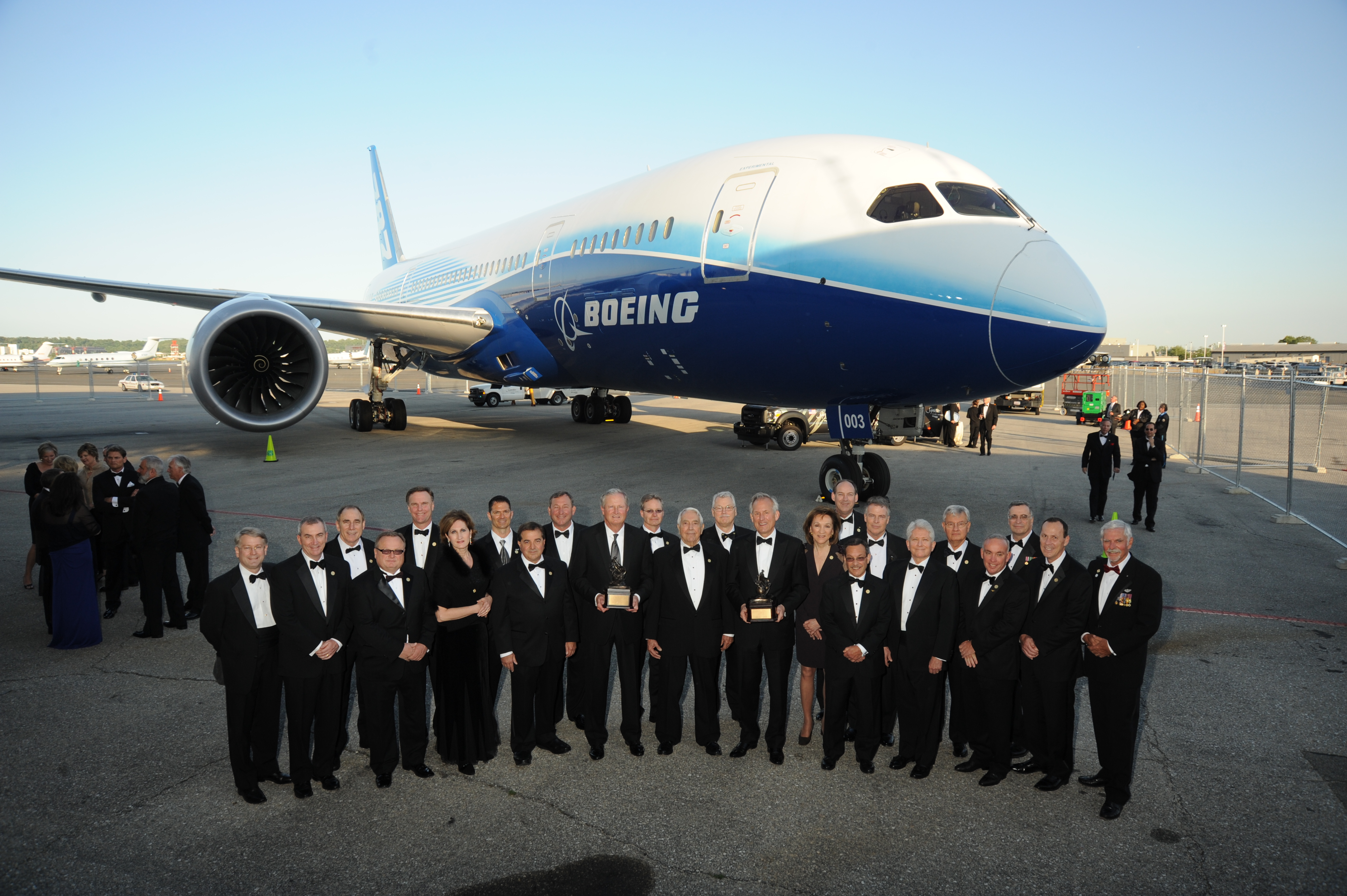
2011 Collier Trophy presented to The Boeing Company for the 787 Dreamliner

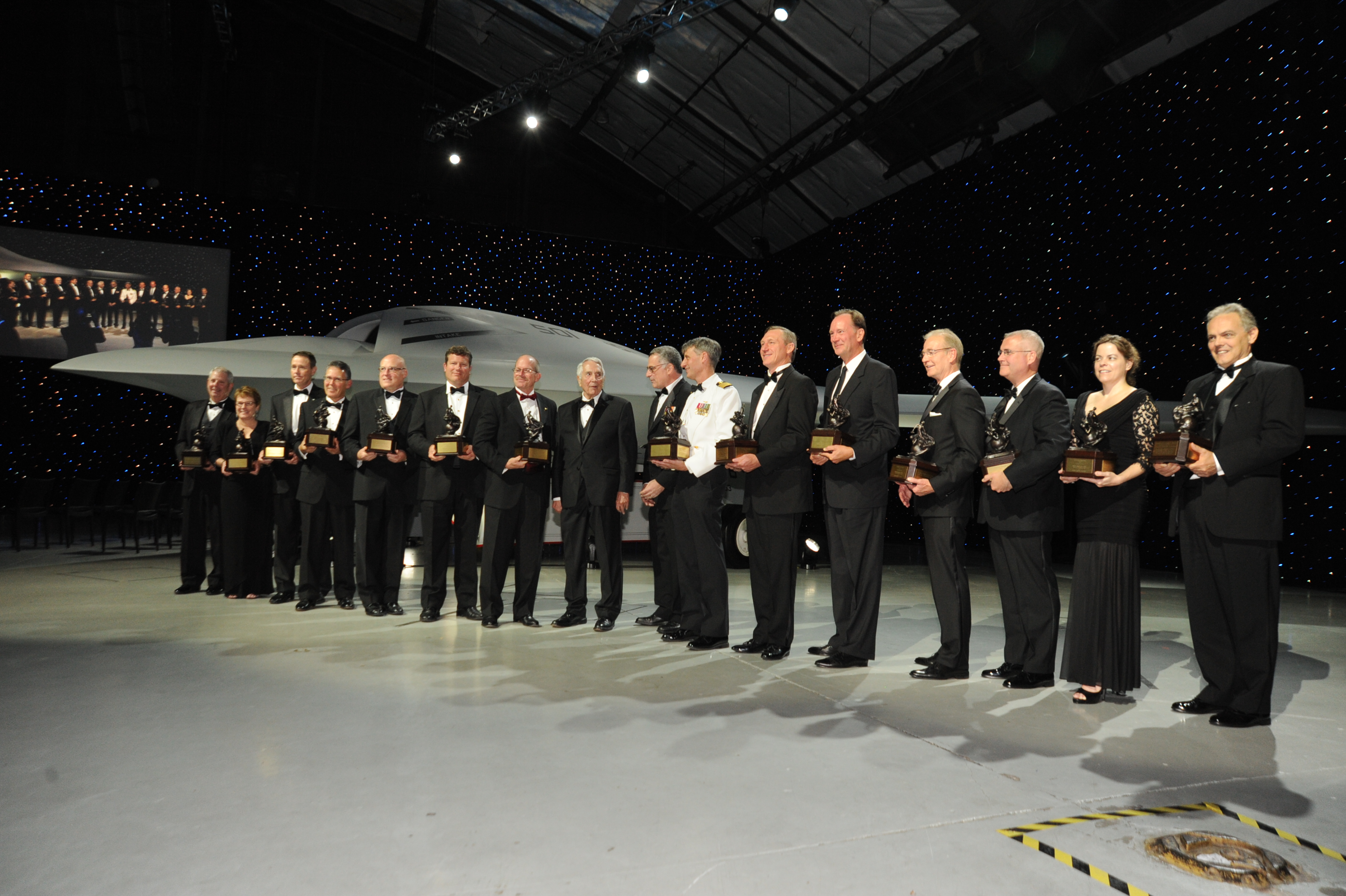
2013 Collier Trophy presented to Northrop Grumman/U.S. Navy for the X-47B

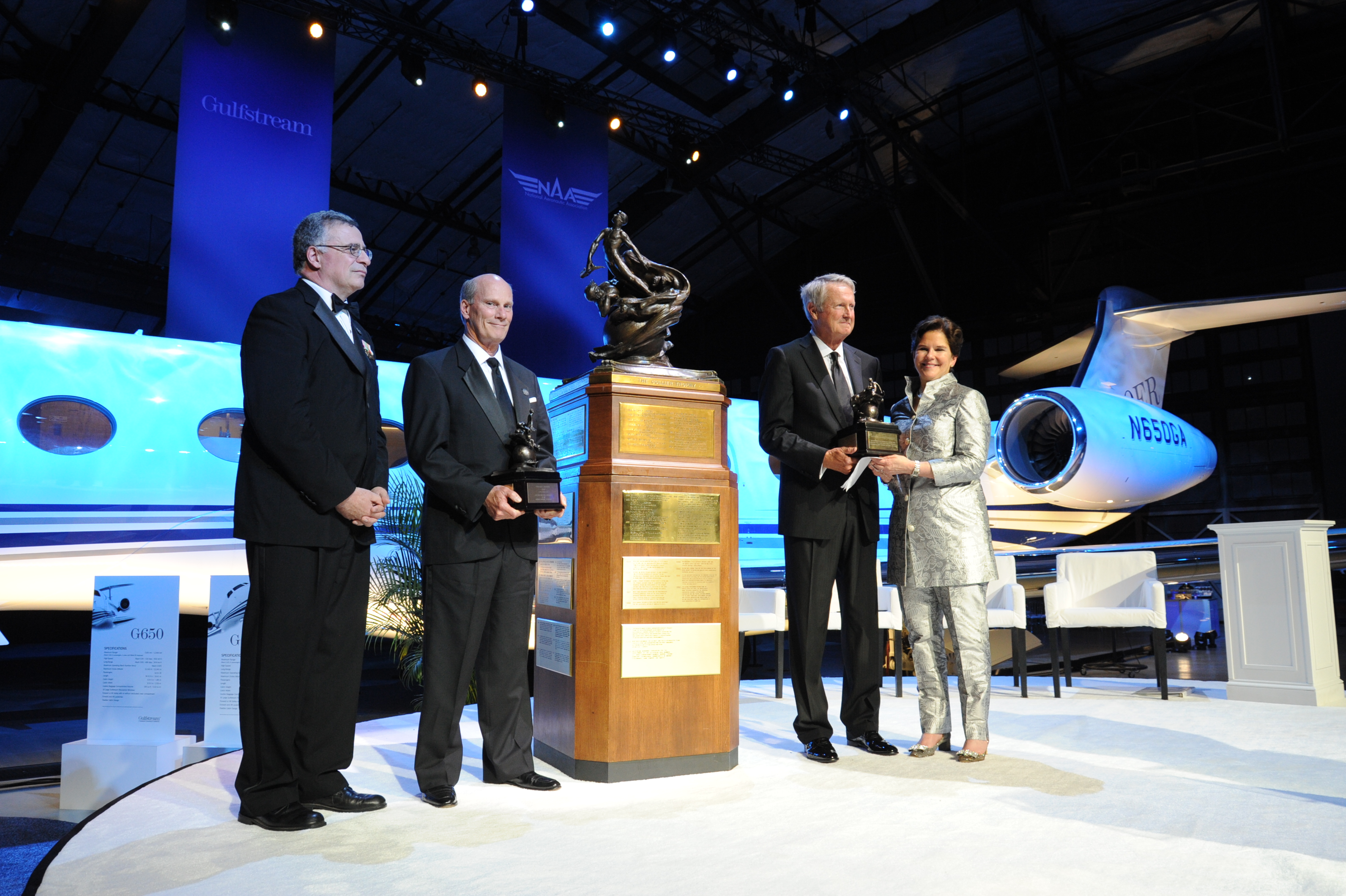
2014 Collier Trophy presented to Gulfstream for the G650

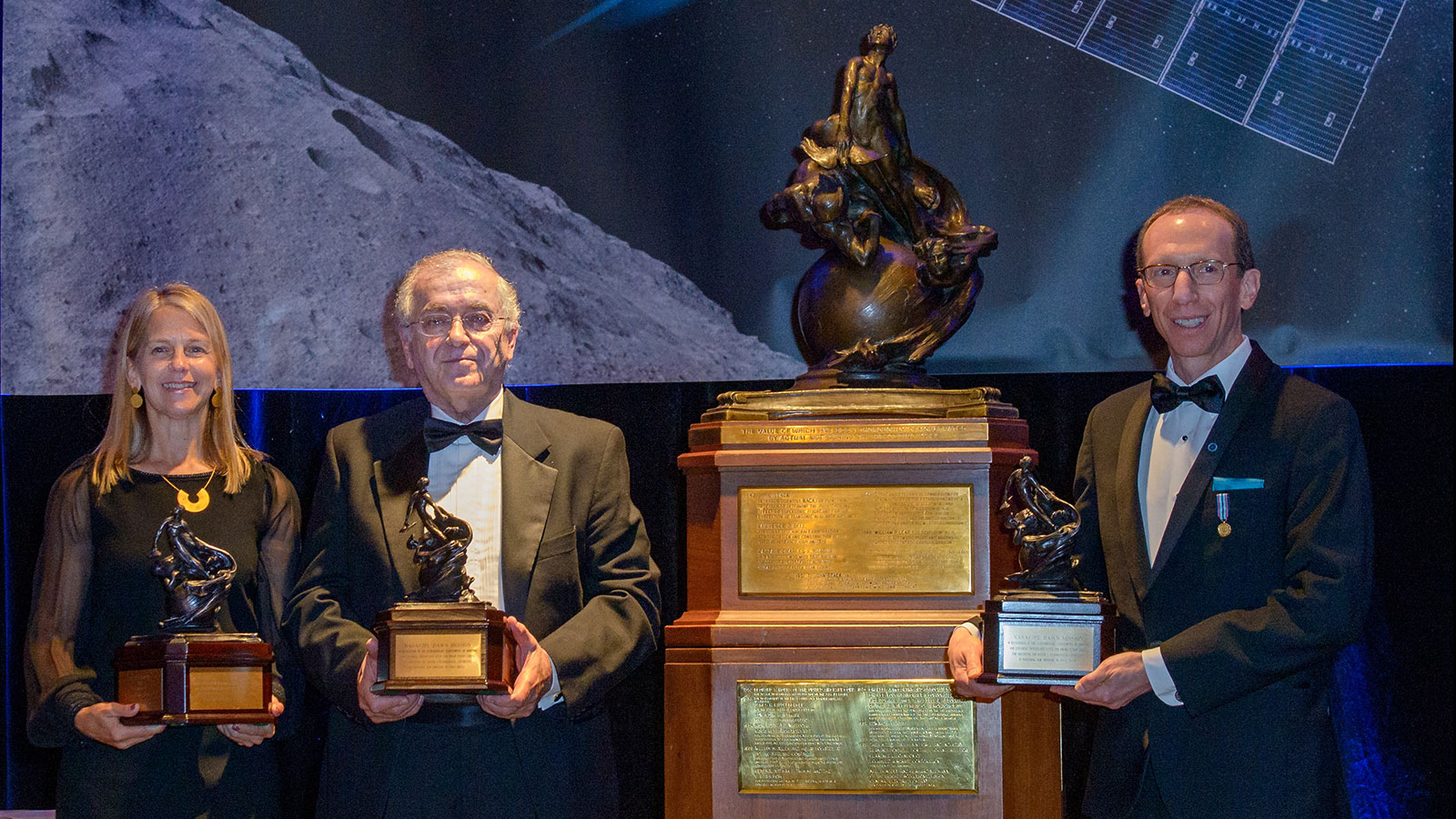
2015 NASA's Dava Newman, left, Charles Elachi, Director of JPL, center, and Marc Rayman, Dawn Mission Director and Chief Engineer, right, accept the Collier on behalf of the NASA/JPL Dawn Mission Team

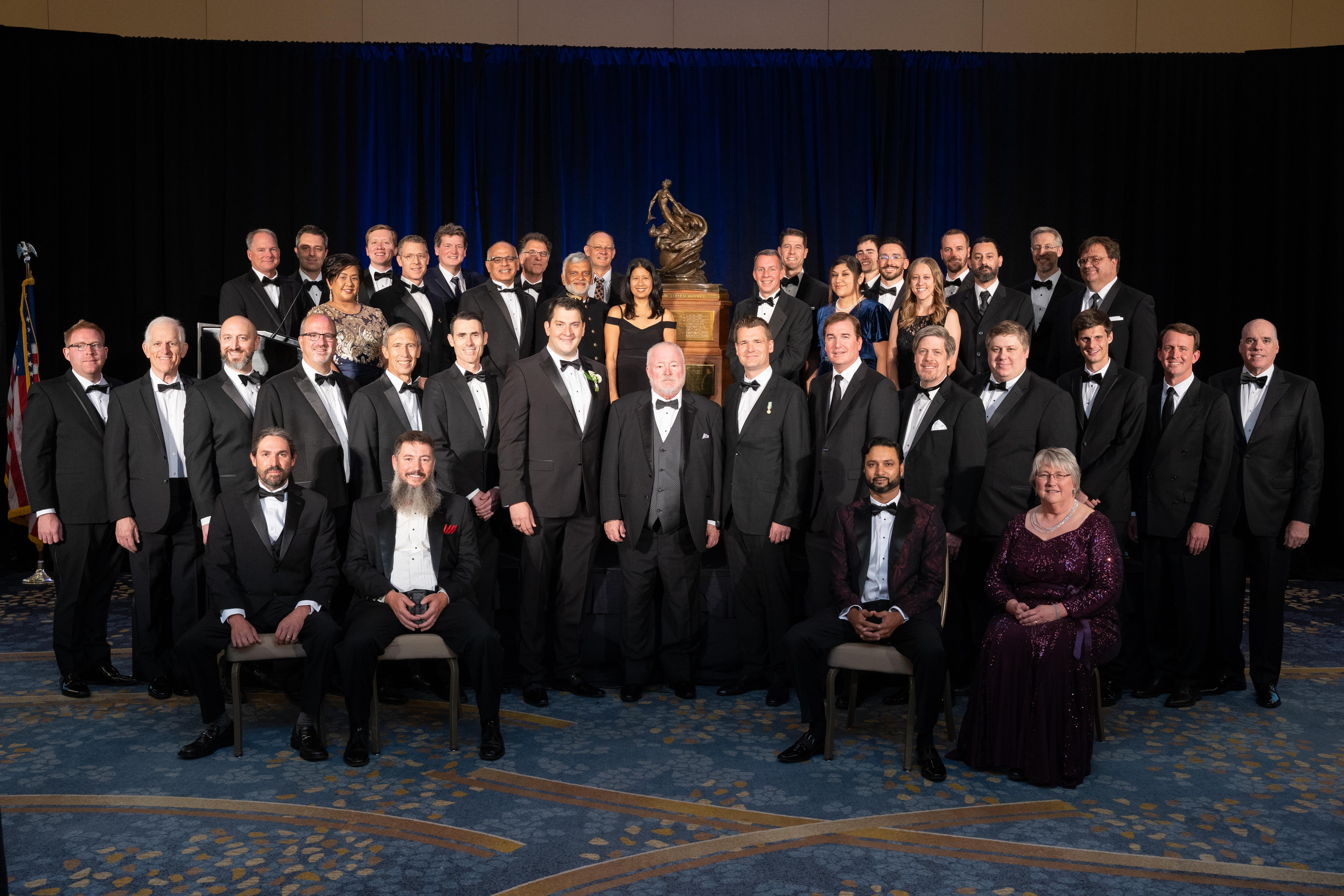
2022 Ingenuity team with the Collier Trophy

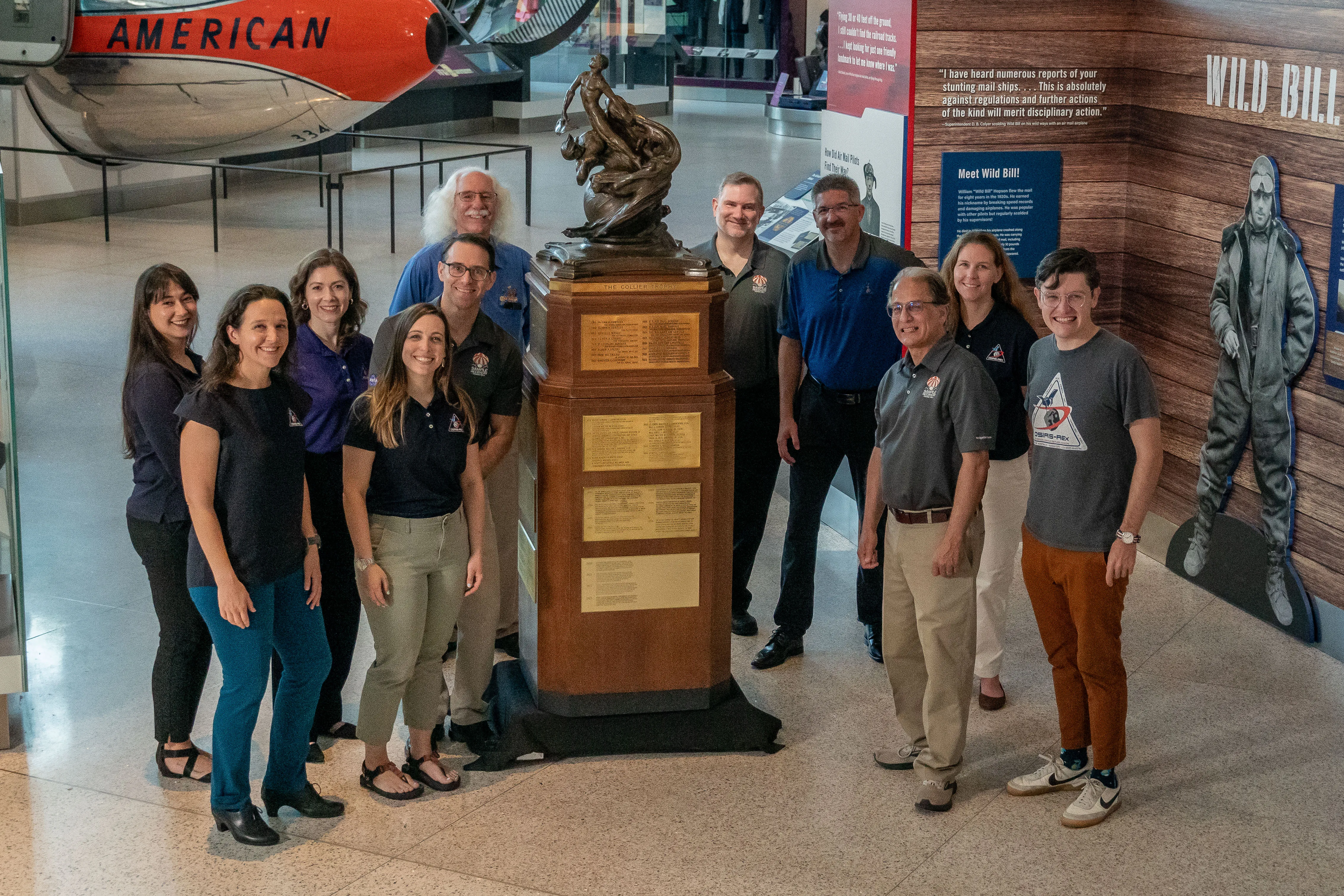
2023 Members of the OSIRIS-REx team with the Collier trophy

== See also ==
- List of aviation awards
- List of space technology awards
