= Commercial Aviation Safety Team =

American commercial aviation safety

The Commercial Aviation Safety Team (CAST) is a US aviation safety partnership between regulators, manufacturers, operators and professional unions, research groups, international organizations to further enhance safety. It was founded in 1997 with a goal to reduce the fixed-wing commercial aviation fatality rate in the United States by 80 percent by 2007. By 2007 CAST was able to report that by implementing safety enhancements, the fatality rate of commercial air travel in the United States was reduced by 83 percent. In 2008, the Commercial Aviation Safety Team won the Collier Trophy. In 2010, CAST envisioned a further reduction in fatalities of fifty percent by 2025.

== History ==
The Commercial Aviation Safety Team was founded in 1997 in response to the White House Commission on Aviation Safety and Security Report that called for a reduction of the commercial aviation accident rate by 80 percent by 2007. From their analysis of thousands of aviation incidents and accidents, CAST formed lessons learned and envisioned critical safety enhancements. Their efforts marked 2008 as the safest year in commercial aviation. Fatal commercial accidents reduced by 83 percent, to a probability of one in 22.8 million flights.

CAST focuses on Part 121 scheduled airliner operations. The CAST team uses a data-driven approach to: analyze safety data; identify hazards; develop specific safety enhancements; implement cost-effective safety enhancements; track implementation; monitor the effectiveness of the safety mitigations; and use experience to continually improve the aviation system. The CAST team shares its findings with aviation safety organizations around the world. The CAST team's new goal is to reduce the remaining part 121 accident risk (50%) by 2025. It plans to achieve this goal by using industry data and analytical tools from Aviation Safety Information Analysis and Sharing Initiative.
