= John Stack (engineer) =

American aerospace engineer (1906–1972)

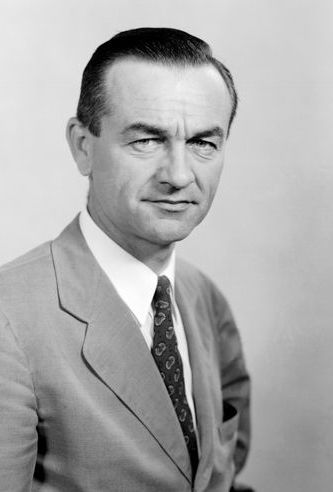
- Born: 1906; Lowell, Massachusetts
- Died: 1972 (aged 65–66)
- Citizenship: American
- Education: Massachusetts Institute of Technology
- Engineering career
- Discipline: aerospace engineer
- Institutions: Langley Research Center
- Practice name: Compressibility Research Division
- Employer: Republic Aviation
- Projects: X-1
- Awards: Collier Trophy

John Stack (1906–1972) was an aerospace engineer. He won the Collier Trophy, in 1947 and 1951.

== Life ==
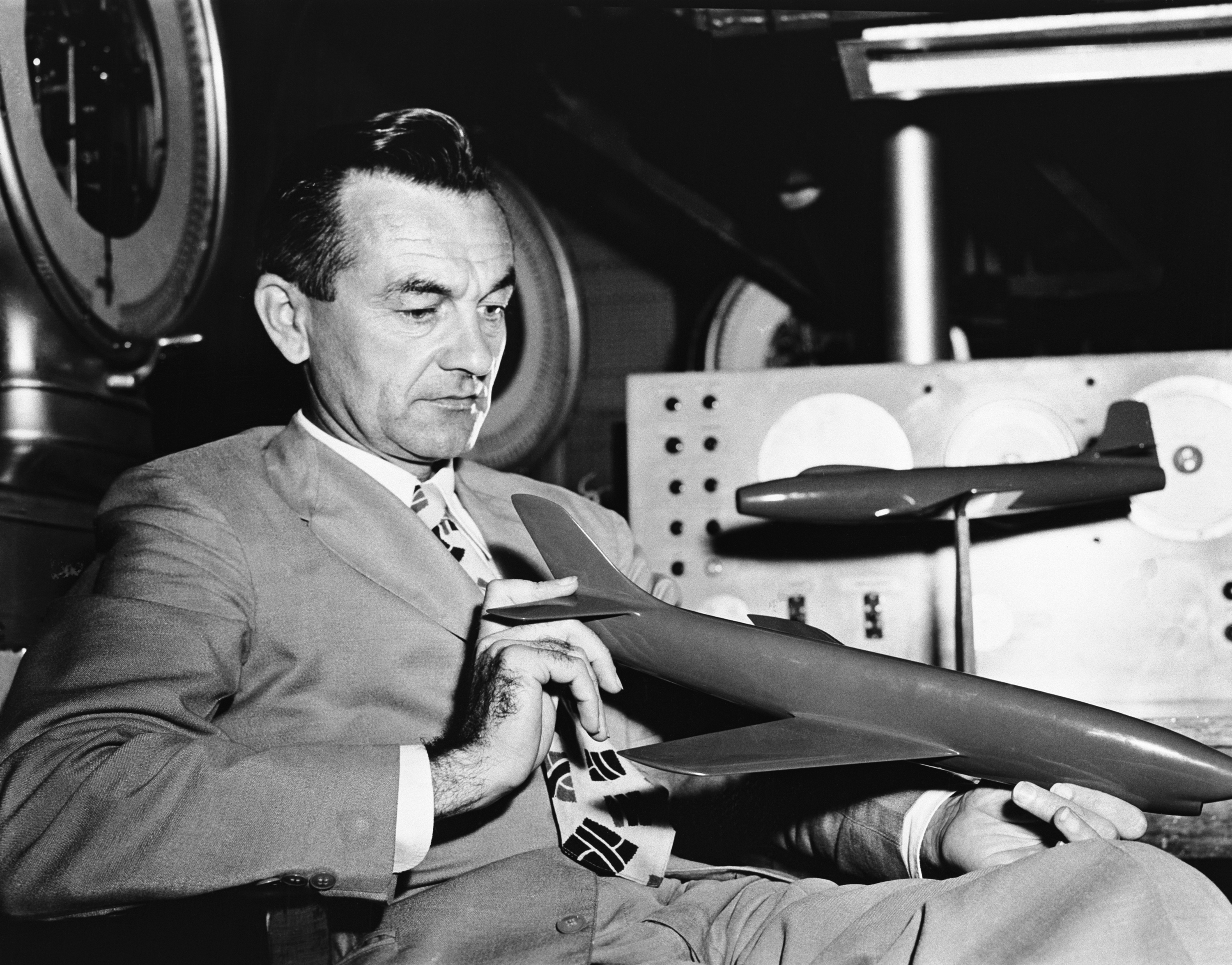
"Let's try the damn thing and see if we can make it work."

Stack was born in Lowell, Massachusetts, and graduated from Massachusetts Institute of Technology. He worked at Langley Research Center from 1928 to 1962, and Republic Aircraft Corporation, from 1962 to 1971. He died in 1972.

He worked on transonic flight. Together with Eastman Jacobs, they made the first photographs of shock waves on a wing. He was part of the Bell X-1 team. He worked with the Variable Density Tunnel, on compressible airflow.

== Works ==
- John Stack The Compressibility Burble, NACA-TN-543, 1935
- John Stack, Albert E Von Doenhoff, Tests of 16 related airfoils at high speed, NACA-TR-492, 1935
- John Stack, W. F. Lindsey, Tests of N-85, N-86, and N-87 Airfoil Sections in the 11-inch High-speed Wind Tunnel, NACA-TN-665, 1938
- John Stack, W. F. Lindsey, R. E. Littell, The Compressibility Burble and the Effect of Compressibility on Pressures and Forces Acting on a Airfoil, NACA-TR-646, 1939
