= Nicholas Lappos =

American aircraft engineer

Nicholas D. Lappos
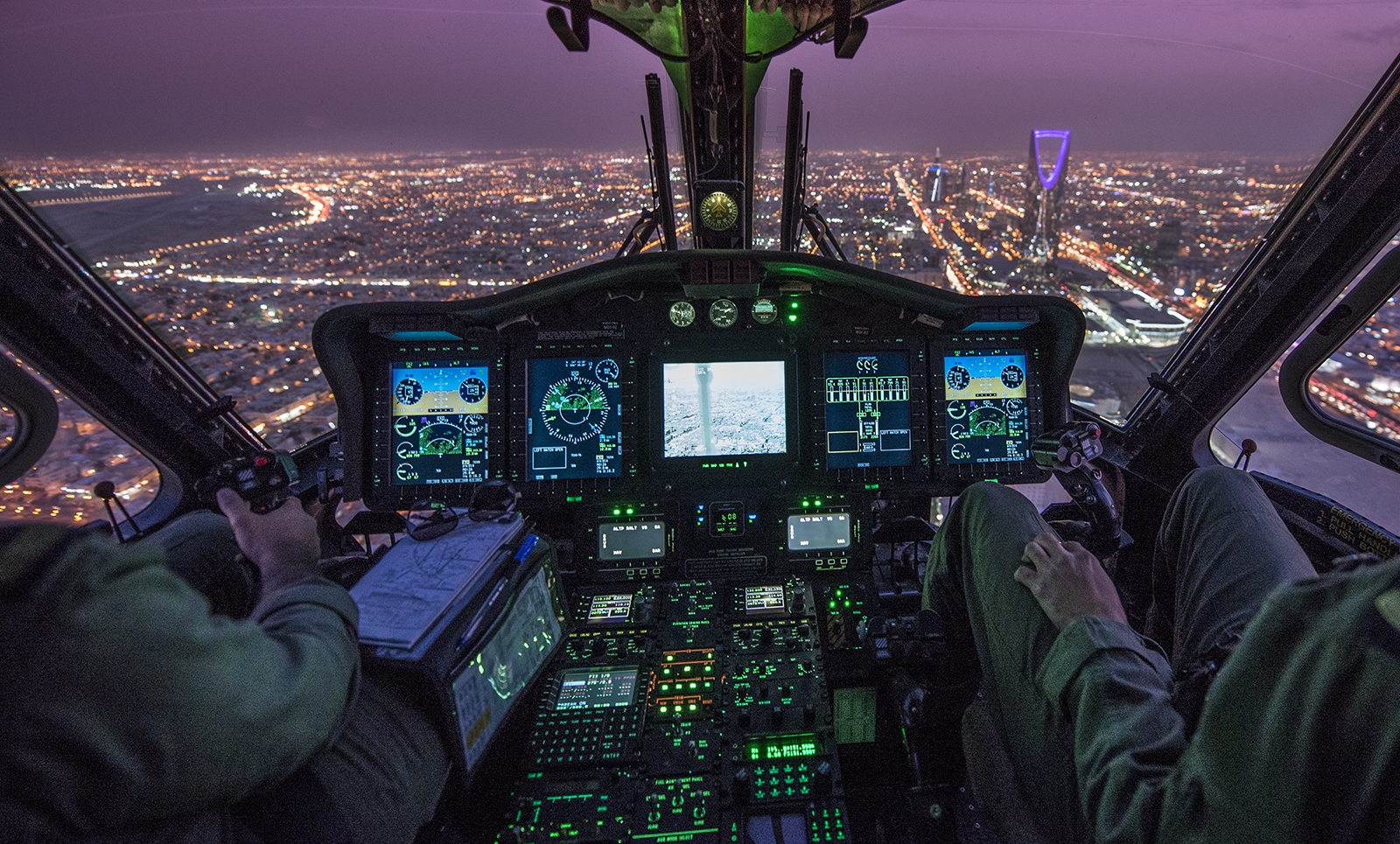
- Sikorsky S-92 night flight over Riyadh
- Born: Nicholas D. Lappos; 12 July 1948 (age 77)
- Education: BS in Aerospace Engineering (1973)
- Alma mater: Georgia Institute of Technology
- Occupations: Aircraft engineer and test pilot
- Employer: Sikorsky Aircraft
- Known for: S-92 team leader
- Awards: Collier Trophy (2002); Sir Barnes Wallis Medal (2013); Technical Fellowship from the American Helicopter Society

Nicholas D. Lappos was the program director for the Sikorsky S-92 helicopter. He shepherded the S-92 program through FAA certification. Sikorsky Aircraft and the S-92 team, led by Nicholas Lappos, were awarded the 2002 Collier Trophy for their work on the S-92.

== History ==
Lappos joined the US Army in 1968. As a Vietnam veteran pilot on the Bell AH-1 Cobra, he was awarded the Bronze Star Medal and the Vietnam Cross of Gallantry with over 900 combat missions. After graduating from Georgia Tech with a bachelor's degree in aerospace engineering, Lappos was hired by Sikorsky where he worked on the CH-53, UH-60, and RAH-66 helicopter platforms. He was the Sikorsky S-76 Project Pilot on board for the maiden flight on 13 March 1977 at William P Gwinn Airport in Jupiter, Florida. Lappos also worked on Sikorsky's co-axial, rigid rotor, advancing blade concept; high speed aerodynamic research platform; the Shadow fly-by-wire flight control research program; and the fantail embedded fenestron rotor research project. He holds 17 patents for advanced engine and flight controls which increase flight safety in poor weather or during extreme maneuvers. In 2002 Lappos became program director for the S-92 helicopter winning the Robert J. Collier Trophy. He joined Gulfstream Aerospace in 2005 as Vice President of Government Programs responsible for the integration of radar and sensor technology into the Gulfstream G-5. In 2008 with Bell Textron, Lappos worked as Senior VP Research Development/Rapid Prototyping and then as Chief Technology Officer. In 2011, he became Senior Technical Fellow for Advanced Technology at Sikorsky. Lappos is Chairman of the United States Vertical Lift Consortium, chartered by the United States Armed Forces next generation development of rotorcraft: The Future Vertical Lift (FVL) initiative. In the FVL initiative, he lobbies for use of common components and a common cockpit to reduce costs while accepting minor inefficiencies. In 2018, the Vertical Flight Society awarded him the Alexander A. Nikolsky Honorary Lectureship. Lappos lectures on the "Design Advantages of an Integrated Cyber-Physical Aircraft" which collates his test pilot experience and test engineer knowledge on how modern digital flight controls, real-time usage monitoring, and airborne analytics can replace the sub-system design rule paradigm. Lappos has flown over 70 different helicopters and amassed more than 7,500 flight hours.

== Sikorsky S-92 team leader ==
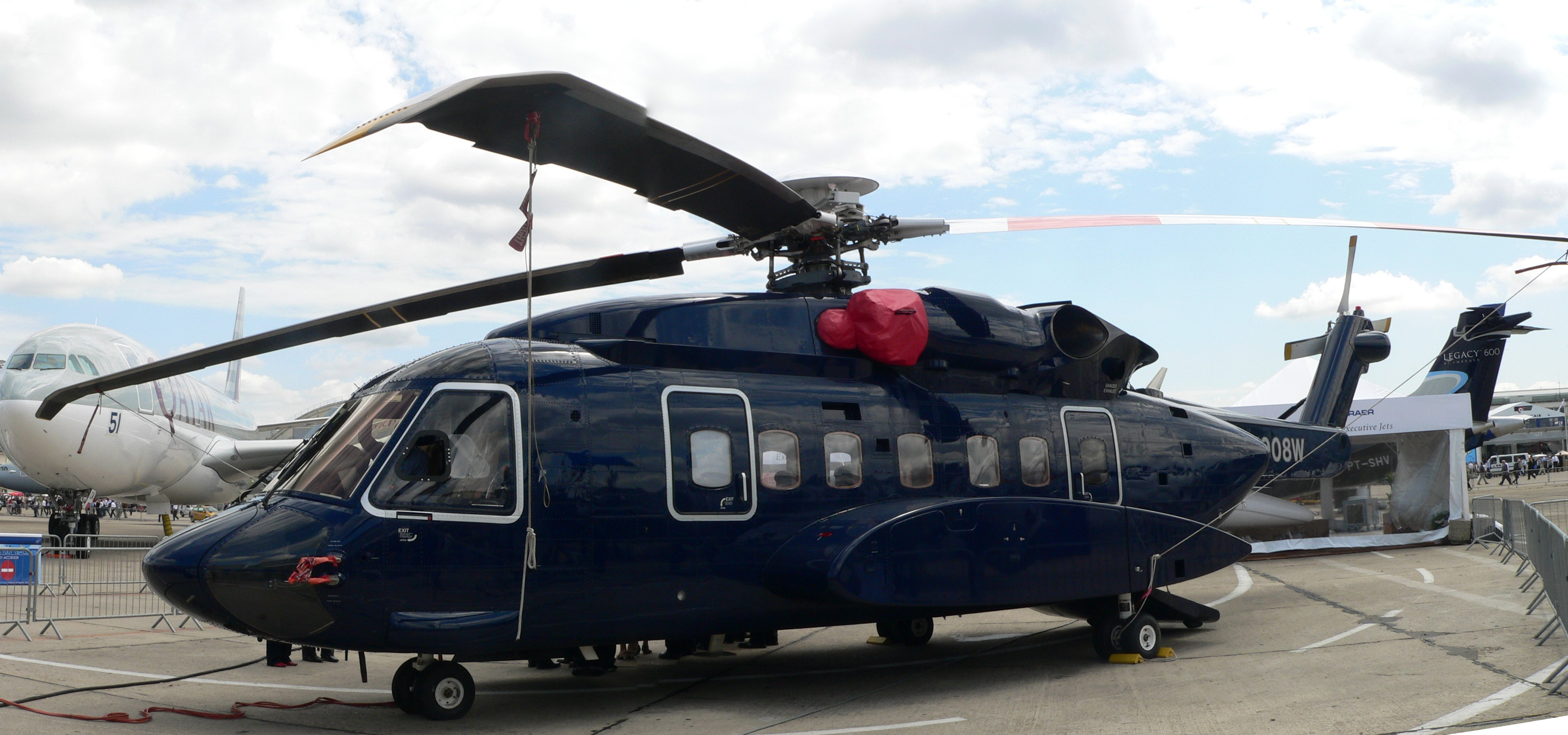
Sikorsky S-92

FAA certified under part 29, the S-92 (military H-92) is a 19-passenger, twin-engine transport that has a range of approximately 575 miles at speeds of up to 190 miles per hour. Safety improvements include: an onboard health monitor of all critical drive-system components, the highest crashworthiness standard fuel system, enhanced bird-strike design, and increased protection from lightning and high-energy field radiation. The S-92 engine failure design permits safe landings within the entire flight envelope. Focused on reducing costs, the S-92's transmission is the only component requiring overhaul at 6,000 hours. It has a full-height cabin (six-foot) and reduces cabin noise by as much as 50 percent. Sikorsky developed an active vibration control system that creates counter vibrations to cancel the vibration signatures normally present which achieves a 30-percent decrease in vibration levels.

== 2002 Collier Trophy ==
In 2002, Nicholas Lappos became the director of test engineering and then the program director for the S-92 program, finishing its development and taking it through its successful certification. Sikorsky Aircraft and the S-92 team, led by Nicholas Lappos, were awarded the 2002 Collier Trophy for their work on the S-92. The National Aeronautic Association (NAA) has chosen a rotorcraft for the Collier Trophy in only four previous occasions: in 1930, to Harold Pitcairn's autogyro; in 1950, to the Helicopter manufacturers, United States Armed Forces, and United States Coast Guard for using helicopters to rescue over 10,000 wounded in Korea; in 1983, to the U.S. Army and Hughes Helicopters for the AH-64A Apache; and in 1990, to Bell Helicopter and Boeing for the world's first large-scale tiltrotor aircraft, the V-22 Osprey.

== 2022 National Academy of Engineering ==
In 2022, Nicholas Lappos was appointed to the National Academy of Engineering. Lappos (AE, 1973) is a Sikorsky Aircraft Senior Technical Fellow Emeritus in Advanced Technology, responsible for the Technical Fellow community and introduction of advanced technologies into new and existing products, and serves on the Georgia Tech Aerospace Engineering School Advisory Council (AESAC). During his career, he spent a total of 39 years at Sikorsky Aircraft, first as a flight test engineer then at the pilot office where he spent 27 years. He has flown over 70 different helicopters and amassed more than 7,500 flight hours. During his time at Sikorsky, he participated in the development of the S-76, UH-60 Black Hawk, RAH-66 Comanche, S-69 Advancing Blade Concept (ABC), S-76 Fantail, S-76 Shadow fly-by-wire demonstrator, CH-53E Super Stallion, and the S-92. In 2018, Lappos was selected for the prestigious 2019 Alexander A. Nikolsky Honorary Lectureship, awarded by the Vertical Flight Society (VFS). He is being recognized by NAE for “For improving rotary wing flight performance and serving as test pilot, engineer, inventor, technologist, and business leader.”

== 2022 Utah Academy of Engineering and Science ==
The NAE award was followed by a 2022 appointment to the Utah Academy of Engineering and Science.
