= Lewis A. Rodert =

American aircraft engineer

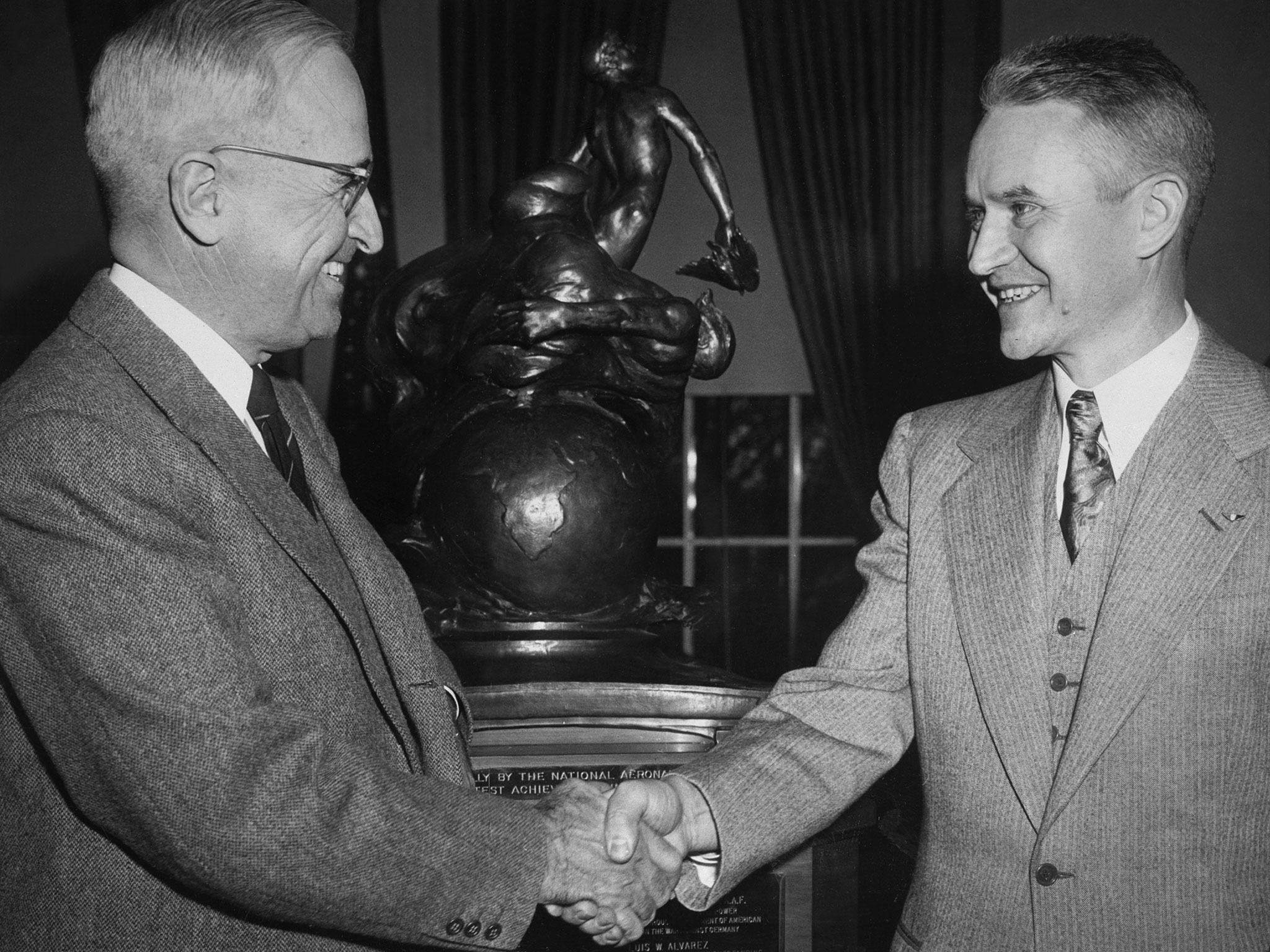
- Lew Rodert accepting the Collier Trophy from President Harry S Truman in December 1947
- Born: Lewis August Rodert; February 26, 1906; Kansas City, Missouri, US
- Died: October 11, 1973 (aged 67); Fresno, California, US
- Education: B.S. (1930)
- Alma mater: University of Minnesota
- Occupation: Aircraft anti icing
- Spouse: Ellen Elizabeth Schumacher (1916-2003)
- Children: 4
- Awards: Collier Trophy (1946); University of Minnesota Outstanding Achievement Medal (1954); John Price Wetherill Medal

Lewis August Rodert (1906–1973) of the National Advisory Committee for Aeronautics (NACA) was awarded the 1946 Collier Trophy for the design, development, and practical application of a thermal aircraft anti-icing system. NACA icing research leader from 1936 to 1945. Lew built his own de-icing systems on a Lockheed 12A and a Curtiss C-46 creating a flying de-ice laboratory.

== Biography ==
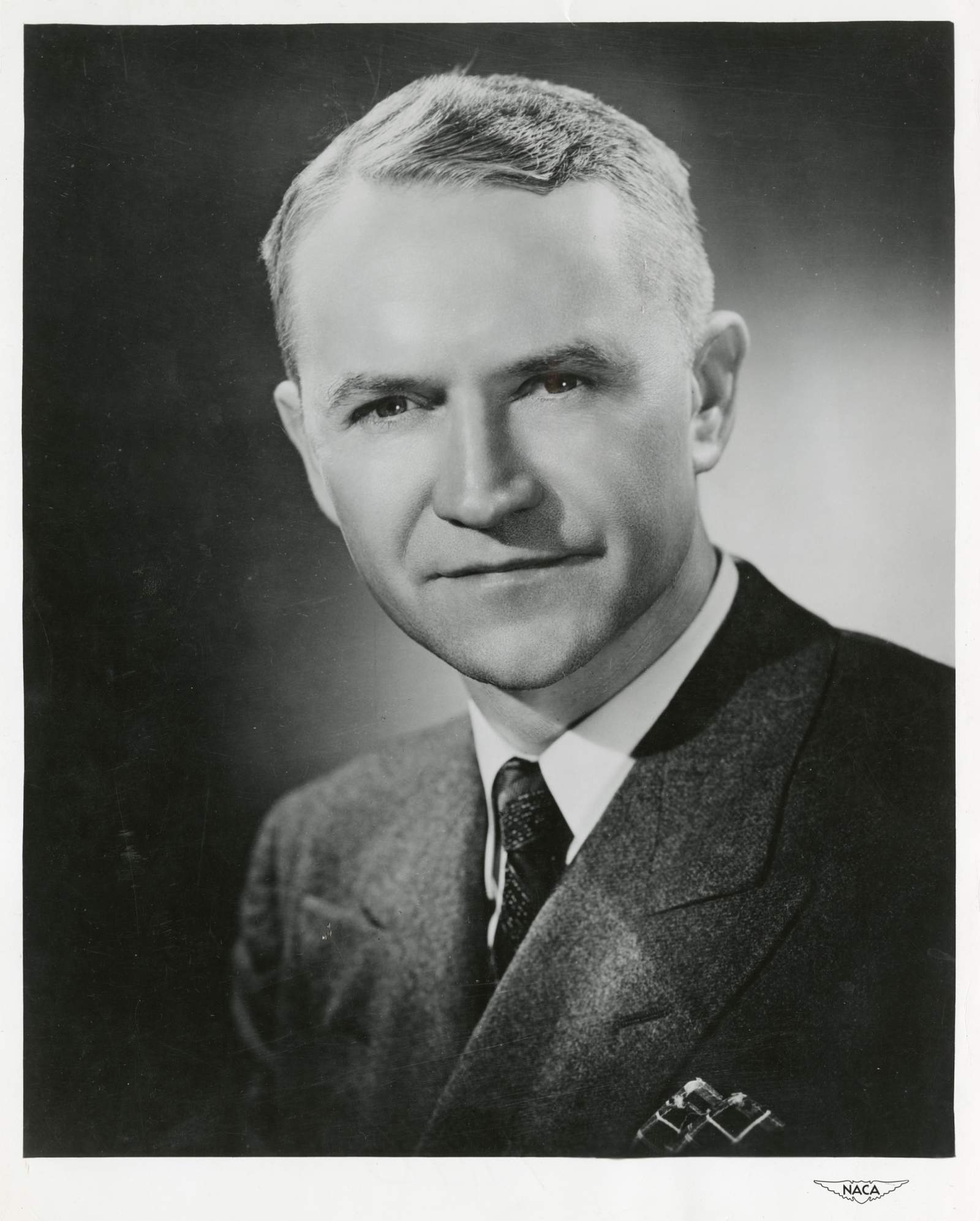
Lewis A Rodert

Born February 26, 1906, to Emil Carl Rodert and Etta Rachel Lewis in Kansas City, Missouri, Lewis August Rodert was raised on a Kansas farm. At age 17, he graduated first from Garnett High School's Class of 1923. Rodert attended the Kansas City Junior College, then graduated with a bachelor's degree from the University of Minnesota in 1930. His grandfather August Rodert invented a wind wagon for traveling on the plains. He taught aeronautical engineering at Duluth Junior College in Minneapolis, then he then worked for Curtiss Aeroplane & Motor Company in Buffalo, New York. Rodert started at the NACA's Langley laboratory in 1936. On 26 December 1937, he married Ellen Elizabeth Schumacher (1916-2003) and they had four children together: Linda; Charles; Merideth; Robert. Rodert transferred to the California Ames Laboratory in 1941. In 1948, working as chief of the Flight Research Branch for the NACA's Cleveland laboratory, his aircraft fire prevention research focused on developing low volatility fuel called "safety fuel". In 1956 Rodert joined Lockheed in Burbank, California, as a special assistant on research management. Then battling mental illness, he faded from the aviation industry. The Roderts divorced in June 1967. Lewis A. Rodert died on October 11, 1973, at age 67 in Fresno, California.

== Aircraft thermal anti-ice development ==
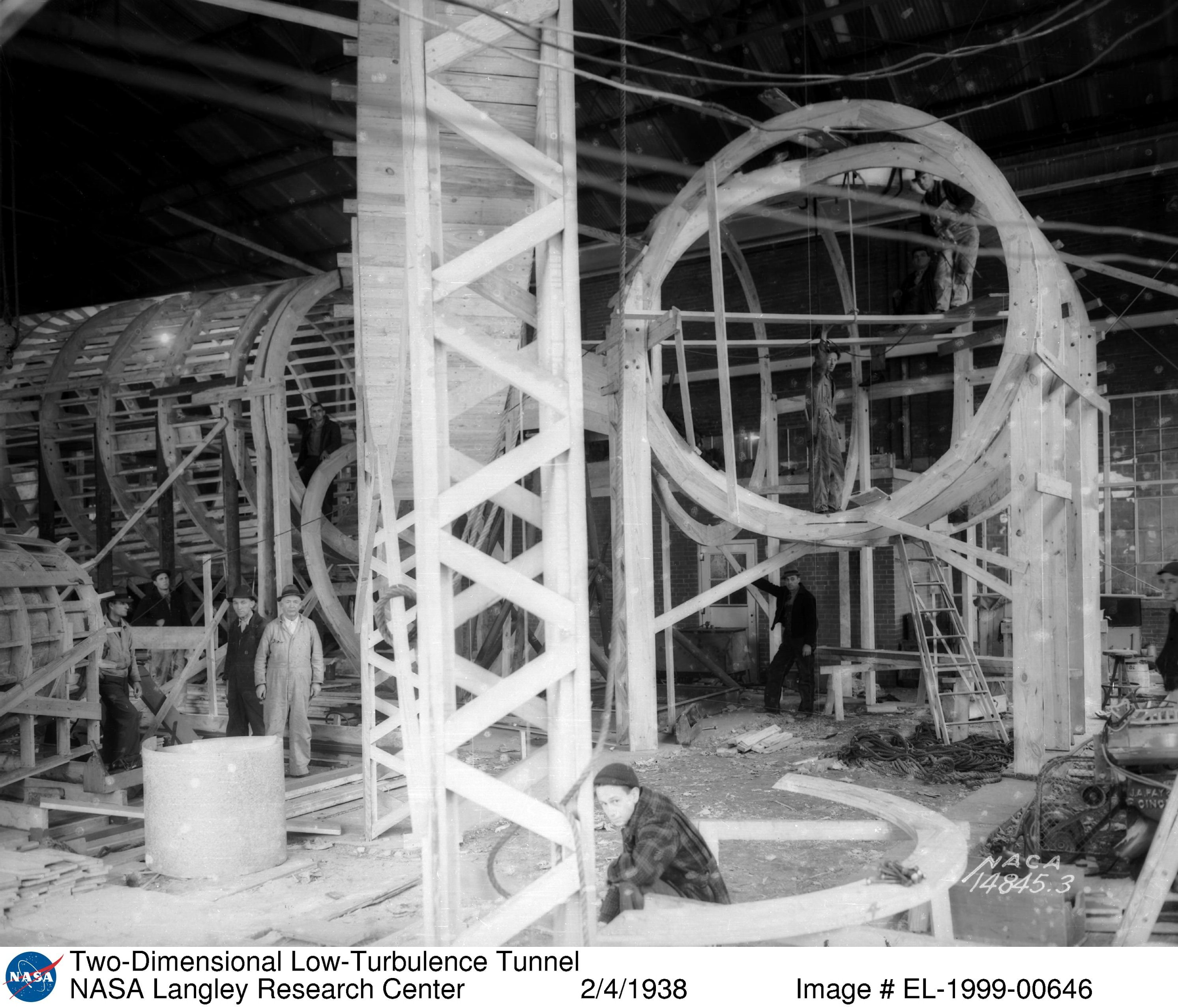
NACA "Ice" wind tunnel used by Rodert

In September 1936, Lewis A. Rodert joined the NACA Langley Memorial Aeronautical Laboratory (LMAL) and working with Alun R. Jones, reworked the icing problem. The prevailing thought was that ice added weight and prevented aircraft from climbing out of the icing areas. The new research discovered that icing was much worse than just-added weight. The ice changed the wing's airfoil shape, both decreasing lift and increasing drag. Additionally, instruments and carburetors iced over, causing faulty readings and choked engines. Ice adhering to propellers further decreased engine & propeller performance. Ice covered windshields, jammed flight control joints, and cover antennas making radios almost useless. All the dangerous icing effects often occur within minutes. In September 1937 using a United DC-3, Rodert's team demonstrated that even small amounts of ice greatly affected lift, drag, and stall speed. This discovery resulted in construction of a large icing tunnel at Langley. Disappointingly, he discovered tunnel ice did not resemble natural ice formation. B.F. Goodrich Rubber Company developed an inflatable boot on the wing's leading edge that physically broke ice that was partially effective and good enough to become standard equipment in the late 1930s. Rodert and Jones successfully flight tested a US Navy Martin XBM-1 using excess engine heat to remove ice encouraged further development and testing. The NACA approved modifications to an all-metal Lockheed 12A and its use as a dedicated anti-ice test bed that also had the priority support of the Lockheed Company's Vice President and Chief Engineer Hall L. Hibbard. They diverted hot gases from the engine to heat the leading wing edge from inside the wing while mixing in cool ram air to keep the metal from becoming too hot and weakening. By August 1939, the design was mature and being tested on an operational US Navy PBY flying boats. The Navy Bureau of Aeronautics helped modify the Lockheed 12A design to fit the PBY. In November 1939, the U.S. Army Air Corps (USAAC) ordered the Lockheed 12 to Wright Field for testing. At Wright, Major C.M. Cummings of the Equipment Branch helped Rodert finalize the design. The USAAC bought new wings and a modified windshield for $25,000 from Lockheed for the NACA for research. Lockheed fabricated the wings and Rodert moved the Flight Research Branch to the Ames Laboratory next to the Navy's Moffett Field in California. The Ames based team used a North American O-47 for tests until the 12A was ready from the Lockheed factory on 22 January 1941.

In December 1947, U.S. President Harry S. Truman congratulated Lewis A. Rodert of the National Advisory Committee for Aeronautics (NACA) on the 1946 Collier Trophy for the design, development, and practical application of a thermal aircraft anti-icing system that year's greatest achievement in American aviation. President Truman had a personal interest in fellow Missourian Rodert winning the 1946 Collier Trophy. The President's plane, the Independence, a Douglas DC-6, was one of the first production models utilizing a thermal de-ice system. Pressurized cabins allowed aircraft to fly above icing levels, and improved ground de-icing fluids helped diminish the ice hazards. Satisfied with his de-icing work, Rodert turn to his new crusade: reducing the hazard of aircraft post-crash fires.
