= Charles E. Whitsett =

American USAF and NASA engineer

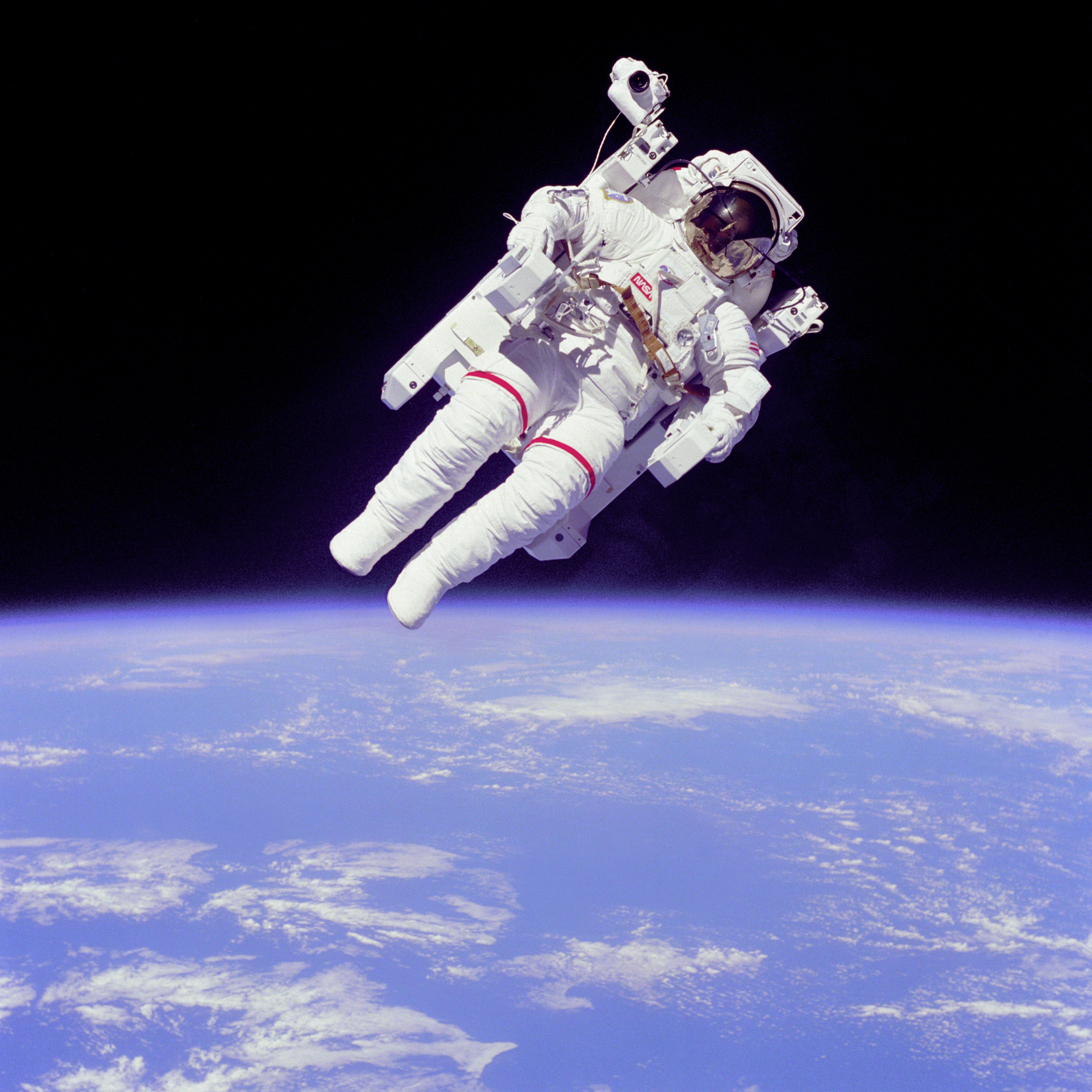
- Whitsett's vision becomes reality as Bruce McCandless II flies the Manned Maneuvering Unit (MMU) on STS-41B in February 1984
- Born: Charles Edward Whitsett Jr; October 18, 1936; Mobile, Alabama
- Died: October 14, 1993 (aged 56)
- Education: Auburn University
- Occupation: Engineer
- Employer(s): NASA; USAF
- Known for: Manned Maneuvering Unit (MMU)
- Spouse: Evelyn
- Children: Edith, Steven, and Benjamin
- Awards: Collier Trophy 1984; NASA Exceptional Engineering Achievement Medal 1986

Charles Edward "Ed" Whitsett Jr. (1936-1993) was a USAF officer and NASA engineer specializing in solutions for effective human movement in zero gravity. The pinnacle of his work was the using the Manned Maneuvering Unit (MMU) which enabled satellite rescue and repair. For this capability, Whitsett along with NASA, Martin Marietta, Bruce McCandless, and Walter W. Bollendonk received the 1984 Robert J. Collier Trophy for "the greatest achievement in aeronautics or astronautics in America."

== Life ==
Charles Edward "Ed" Whitsett Jr. was born on October 18, 1936, in Mobile, Alabama. In 1957 he graduated from Auburn University.

== Weightless maneuvering ==
In 1961, three years before a US astronaut walked in space, USAF Officer Whitsett imagined how astronauts could "fly" in space without tethers while working at the Air Force Institute of Technology (AFIT) at Wright-Patterson Air Force Base, Ohio. In 1962, he studied the human body's response to weightlessness. He developed the mathematical model for human mass distribution, center of mass, moments of inertia, and body movement. Whitsett used a reduced-gravity aircraft to validate his model, but the test was inconclusive. He started work at NASA in 1966 while on assignment from the USAF as the experiment coordinator for the crewed spaceflight program. In 1968, astronaut McCandless joined Whitsett's office to work on a "Buck Rodgers style backpack." Whitsett then worked for the Apollo Applications Program (AAP), Project Apollo, and Skylab. Project Apollo Missions had 170 hours of extravehicular, Whitsett developed movement devices for the lunar surface environment, including a hand-held, self-propulsion gun.

In 1971 he designed a nitrogen gas powered device called the M509. Maj. Charles E. Whitsett, USAF worked in the STS Group, Space Shuttle Program Office, NASA's Johnson Space Center (JSC). In 1973, Major Whitsett headed the M509 experimental program while assigned to the Manned Spacecraft Center and the Air Force Space and Missile Systems Organization (SAMSO). His control of development objectives, costs, and his ability to consolidate research between USAF and NASA was noted by administrators. Whitsett highlighted the backpack program: "An experimental MMU tested onboard the NASA Skylab Program orbital workshop established key piloting characteristics and capability base for future MMU systems" and yielded the operational MMU used on the Shuttle missions. Dr. Charles E. Whitsett, Jr. and Astronaut McCandless were the principal investigators for Skylab's experiment M509 in 1973-74. M509 demonstrated the Manned Maneuvering Unit (AMU) flying qualities for future AMU design requirements and projected EVA capabilities. The entire EVA system included two jet-powered AMUs, an automatically stabilized maneuvering unit (ASMU), and a handheld maneuvering unit (HHMU). The ASMU was powered by a high-pressure nitrogen propellant tank and battery. Pilot directed jets supplemented a control gyro and reaction stabilization jets. The ASMU provided propellant and instrumentation for evaluation of the HHMU mode. The ASMU used 14 fired thrusters located in various positions on the backpack. Arms extending from the backpack had thruster controls. Flying the units inside Skylab, three crew members flew four experiment flights. They tested operations procedures and analyzed flight qualities reporting on progress to mission control. Flying the AMU, the right hand controls roll about all three axes and the left hand controls movement forward, back, left, and right. The gyro with a computer enables hands free, station keeping operations.

Upon his USAF retirement in 1977, he was hired by NASA. Whitsett spent over 100 hours flying the MMU's prime contractor simulator at Martin Marietta in Denver.

== Collier Trophy ==
In February 1984, on STS-41B, Astronaut Bruce McCandless, on his first space flight used the Manned Maneuvering Unit (MMU) on a spacewalk to rescue three disabled satellites. These satellites included the Solar Maximum Mission satellite and the malfunctioning Westar VI satellite as part of STS-51A. This was the first untethered, free flight of the MMU. Charles E. "Ed" Whitsett of the Automation and Robotics Division, Johnson Space Center, Houston with astronaut McCandless developed the MMU. NASA and Martin Marietta Corporation were awarded the Collier Trophy in 1984 for the development of the MMU, specifically recognizing NASA's Charles E. Whitsett Jr., Martin Marietta's Walter W Bollendonk, and astronaut McCandless.

== Space station ==
In 1990, Whitsett used Shuttle mission STS-37 crew members to test the Crew and Equipment Translation Aid (CETA) experiment in the payload bay of the Space Shuttle Atlantis. These experiments helped to design movement systems outside of the space station. He envisioned multiple uses for the MMU on the ISS including assembly, transportation, inspection, contingency, and rescue.
