= Neil Burgess Jr. =

American aircraft engineer (1918–1997)

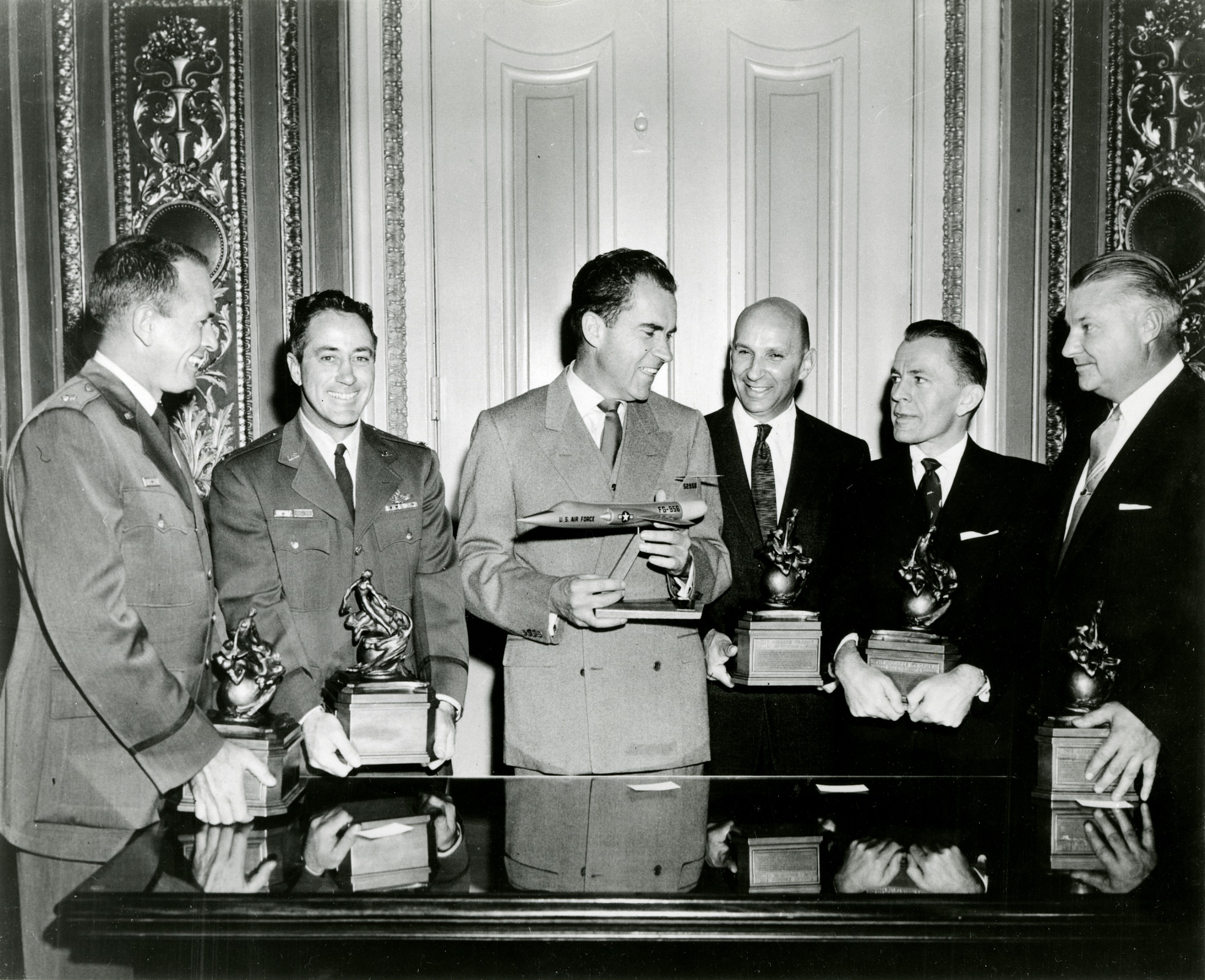
- 1958 Collier Trophy with (left to right) Walter W. Irwin, Howard C. Johnson, USA VP Nixon, Gerhard Neumann, Neil Burgess, Clarence Leonard "Kelly" Johnson
- Born: August 2, 1918; Melrose, Massachusetts
- Died: April 20, 1997 (aged 78); Cincinnati, Ohio
- Education: M.S. electrical engineering (1939)
- Alma mater: Massachusetts Institute of Technology
- Occupations: Aircraft engineer and innovator
- Employer: General Electric
- Known for: General Electric J79
- Spouse: Evelyn Ruth Lent (1922-2000)
- Children: Cynthia; Mark Neil Burgess; Susan; Nancy (1944-2008); Wendy (1957-)
- Parent(s): Roy Neil Burgess (1875-1950); Lucia L. Payne (1870-1937)
- Awards: Collier Trophy (1958) GE Aircraft Engines Hall of Fame Conquistadores del Cielo (Aerospace Executive Association)

Neil Burgess Jr. (August 2, 1918 – April 20, 1997) was a leading American aircraft propulsion engineer and designer. Working at General Electric with Gerhard Neumann, they won the 1958 Collier Trophy for their work on the General Electric J79 turbojet engine which powered the Lockheed F-104 Starfighter.

== Biography ==
Born Neil Burgess Junior on 2 August 1918 to Roy Neil Burgess and Lucia L. Payne of Melrose, Massachusetts. He started working for GE in the 1930s. Burgess earned a Masters in electrical engineering from Massachusetts Institute of Technology in 1939. In 1943 he married Evelyn Ruth Lent (1922-2000) and they had five children: Cynthia, Mark Neil, Susan, Nancy, and Wendy. In 1983, he retired as General Electric vice president for commercial engine marketing serving almost 50 years in engineering and marketing. Burgess died 20 April 1997 in Cincinnati, Ohio.

== J79 ==
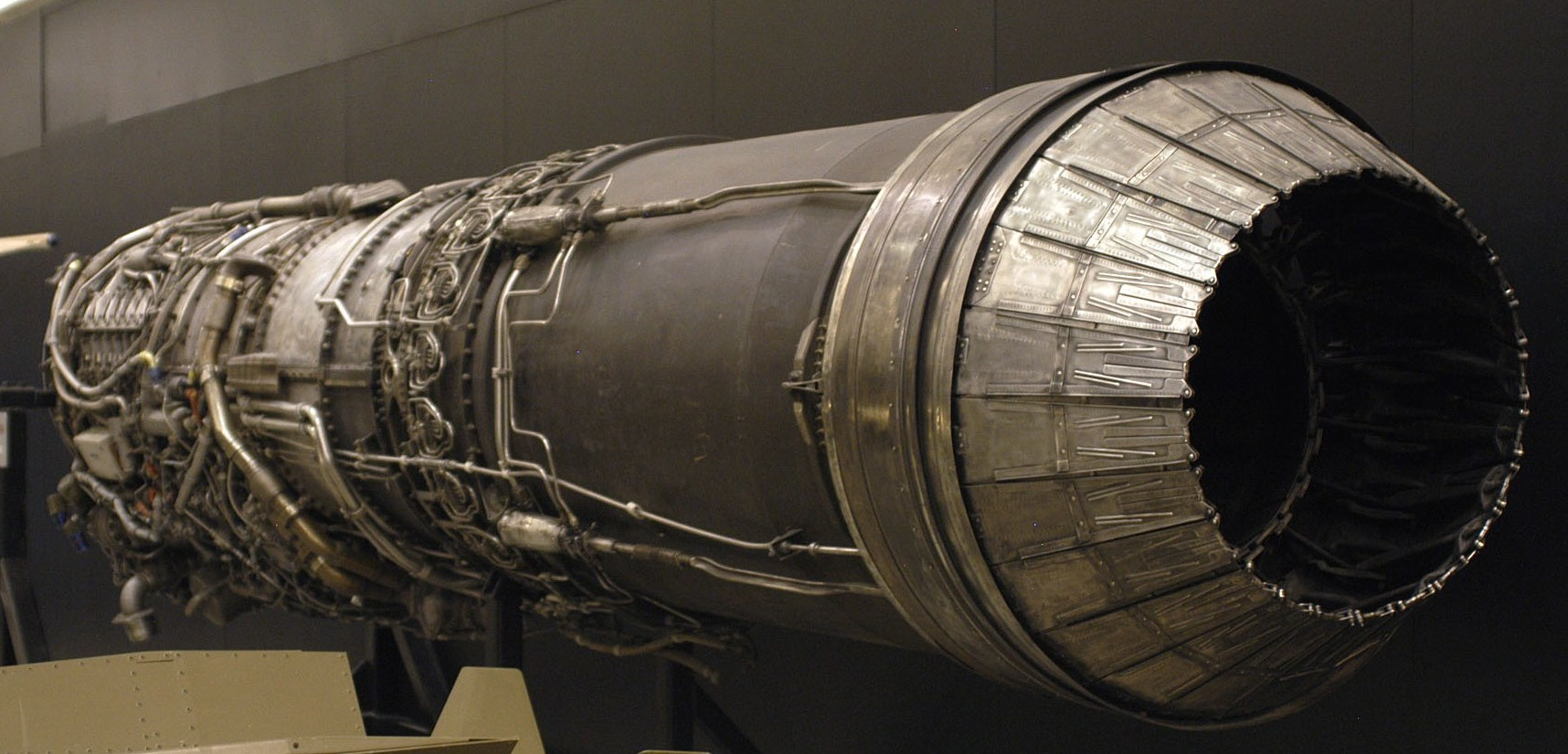
General Electric J79

The J79 and the F-104 were developed concurrently. The J79 was the first engine to exceed Mach 2, Burgess and Neumann solved the problems of rapid acceleration without compressor stall while maintaining reliability and lower fuel consumption over a wide speed range. They reduced compressor stalls by developing the J79's revolutionary "variable stator" that fine-tunes air compression at the engine inlet. The variable stator worked so well that engineers did not believe that engine test cell performance readings. The J79 started test runs in June 1954 and flew on the F-104 maiden flight on 17 February 1956. The first J79 allowed the F-104 to achieve Mach 1.1 in full power and Mach 2.2 with afterburner.

== Collier Trophy ==
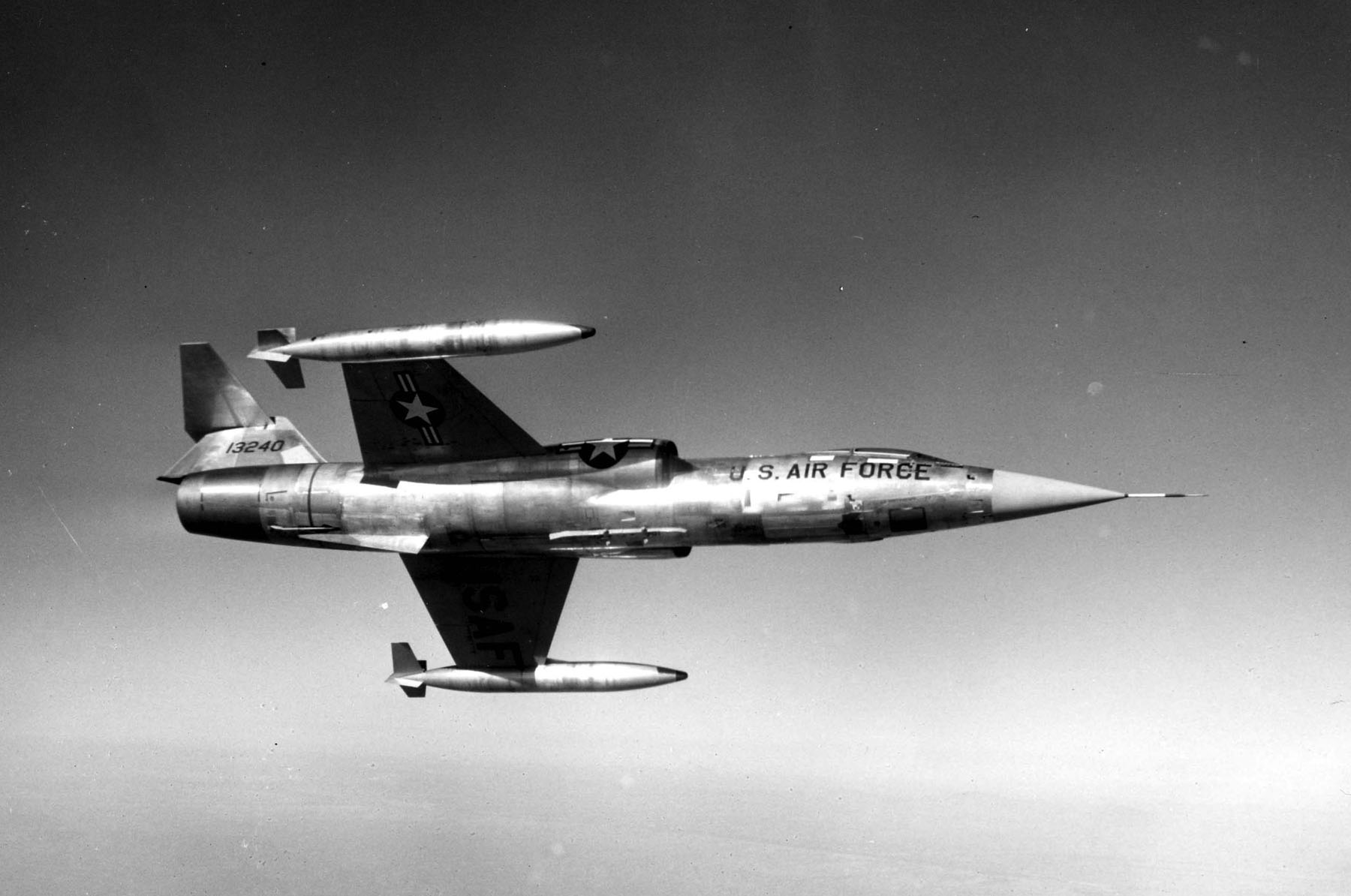
F104G

Awarded in 1958 to the USAF and industry team's co-development of the F-104 airframe by Clarence "Kelly" Johnson of Lockheed Skunk Works and J79 engine by Neil Burgess and Gerhard Neumann of General Electric. Also Maj Howard C Johnson, USAF, for world landplane altitude record and Capt Walter W Irwin, USAF, for world landplane speed record both in the F-104 with the J79 engine. Using the F-104, Major Johnson established a world land plane altitude record of 91,243 Feet; and Captain Irwin, established a world straightaway speed record of 1,404.09 miles per hour.
