= Automatic Ground Collision Avoidance System =

American military aviation safety

Footage from the head-up-display of a U.S. Air Force Arizona Air National Guard F-16 records a save by the aircraft's Automatic Ground Collision Avoidance System (Auto-GCAS) during a training mission, the fourth confirmed by the NASA-designed system. From an altitude of just over 17,000 feet (5,182 m), the pilot executes an 8.1g maneuver which causes the pilot to lose consciousness. After the aircraft enters a steepening dive in full afterburner for twenty seconds, Auto-GCAS intervenes with a recovery maneuver at 8,760 feet (2,670 m), 652-knot (750 mph; 1,208 km/h; 335 m/s) and nose-down almost 55 degrees below the horizon.

The Automatic Ground Collision Avoidance System (Auto-GCAS) enhances safety by mitigating controlled flight into terrain (CFIT) accidents. The Auto-GCAS team was awarded the 2018 Collier Trophy for the design-integration and flight testing in the F-35, marking the year's greatest achievement in aeronautics. This team includes the Air Force Research Laboratory, Lockheed Martin, the F-35 Joint Program Office, the Defense Safety Oversight Council, and NASA.

The Automatic Ground Collision Avoidance System uses inputs from terrain mapping, aircraft location, and automation to avoid ground collisions. The Auto-GCAS system detects imminent ground contact and warns the pilot. If there is no pilot response, the Auto-GCAS takes control, maneuvering to avoid ground contact. When on a safe trajectory, with pilot awareness, control returns to the pilot. Pilot unresponsiveness can be attributed to many factors including: distraction, task saturation, incapacitation, and unconsciousness. The Auto-GCAS system successfully reduced the leading cause of F-16 pilot fatalities.

NASA started working on Auto-GCAS starting in 1997. The system was then jointly developed at the Lockheed Martin Skunk Works and at NASA. In July 2019, seven years ahead of schedule, Lockheed Martin began integration of Auto-GCAS into the F-35 fleet.
