= Ernest G. McCauley =

American aviation innovator and industrialist

- Born: Ernest Gilbert McCauley; August 9, 1889; Baltimore, Maryland, US
- Died: September 11, 1969 (aged 80); Pompano Beach, Florida, US
- Occupation: Propeller innovator
- Known for: McCauley Aviation Corporation
- Spouse: Ruth "Rose" Dewitt McCauley (1896-1952)
- Children: Milton E McCauley (1912-1969); Norma H McCauley Corby (1913-1992); Ward D McCauley (1922-1980); Mabel R McCauley (1917-2003) and two step-daughters Phyllis Godfrey and Joyce Frohock
- Parent(s): Harry Gilbert McCauley (1866-1917); Martha Jane Bounds McCauley (1868-1940)

Ernest Gilbert McCauley (1889 – 1969) was an American aviation pioneer who in 1938 founded McCauley Aviation Corporation. He began his career at the government's Propeller Research Department of the Airplane Design Section, Aviation Section of the Signal Corps based at McCook Field, Dayton, Ohio. In 1939, McCauley reincorporated McCauley Aviation Corporation into McCauley Steel Propeller Company. In December 1941 McCauley's company increased production from 700 to 1500 propellers per month, supporting the war effort.

== Birth and early career ==
McCauley was born August 9, 1889, in Baltimore, Maryland, to Harry Gilbert McCauley and Norma H. Corby. He attended Baltimore Polytechnic Institute and worked as the chief draftsman for a farm equipment manufacturer in New York. He married and worked as chief tool designer for the Corona Typewriter Company of Groton, New York.

In 1917, McCauley began his career at the government's Propeller Research Department of the Airplane Design Section, Aviation Section of the Signal Corps based at McCook Field, Dayton, Ohio. There, he worked on the first aircraft hydraulic wheel brakes and hydraulic flight controls. Together they developed the synchronizing reversible pitch propellers (1922) and hydro-controllable Propeller. He jointly developed military propellers improvements with the chief engineer of the Propeller Research Department, Frank W. Caldwell. McCauley owns 55 patents and with Caldwell holds multiple joint patents on propeller innovations. The hydro-controllable propeller was the first to use engine oil for pitch adjustments, and he sold this patent to Hamilton Standard Propeller Corporation in 1929, joining Hamilton to further improve propellers. In 1938, Ernest G. McCauley founded the McCauley Aviation Corporation, which reincorporated into McCauley Steel Propeller Company in 1939.

McCauley, who suffered from poor hearing, was featured in a Sonotone hearing aid advertisement; he used a hearing aid to improve his work innovating and manufacturing propellers.

Patent: Name, Number, Filed, Issued, Title
| Improvement in Steel Propellers | Pat. No. 2,041,849 | Filed: July 1, 1932 | Issued: May 26, 1936 | Title: Propeller |
| synchronizing mechanism | Pat. No. 1,427,830 | Filed: May 25, 1929 | Issued: September 5, 1922 | Title: sync reversible pitch propellers |

== McCauley propeller legacy ==
After McCauley Aviation Corporation's 1938 founding, innovations continued with: ground-adjustable solid-steel propeller (1939); the one-piece Met-L-Prop for light airplanes (1947); two-blade constant speed propeller "Met-L-Matic" (1953); two-blade constant, full-feathering propeller, alcohol de-ice system "Feth-R-Matic" (1960); three-blade constant speed propellers, three-blade full feathering propellers, constant speed governors (1965); electric propeller de-ice systems (1967); single-piece hub design with threadless blade retention (1970); Synchrophasing governors (1974); three-blade propellers for high-speed turbine engines, magnetic head synchrophasing control systems (1979); four-blade propeller for turbine engines (1980); five-blade turboprop propellers (1987); five-blade propellers with scimitar-shaped blades (1992); Predator B Propeller to General Atomics (2006); and the first composite fixed pitch propeller for light-sport aircraft (2010).

== Marriage and family ==
About 1912, McCauley married Ruth "Rose" Dewitt (1896–1952). They had six children: Dr Milton E McCauley (1912–1969); Norma H McCauley Corby (1913–1992); Ward D McCauley (1922–1980); Mabel Adams and two step-daughters, Phyllis Godfrey and Joyce Frohock. McCauley divorced Ruth in 1938 and filed suit against Dr John DeForest Smith for alienation of affections. On January 9, 1953, he married Rose M. Harkness in Fort Lauderdale, Florida.

== Death ==
McCauley died on 11 September 1969, in Pompano Beach, Florida. The family plot interment is in Dayton Memorial Park Cemetery, Dayton, Ohio.

The 1954 citation by the Secretary of the US Air Force for Ernest G. McCauley reads: "His invention of the HYDRO-CONTROLLABLE PROPELLER in 1924 has been an outstanding achievement, and culmination with his more recent inventions of the SOLID STEEL Propeller for trainers in 1939, and the one-piece MET-L-PROP for the light airplane in 1947: All are aviation firsts in their fields, and thus Mr. McCauley can be credited with a very important role in the advancement of aviation in the past 36 years." (signed Harold E. Talbott)

== See also ==
- Wallace Rupert Turnbull
- Sylvanus Albert Reed
- McCauley Propeller Systems
- Frank W. Caldwell, awarded 1933 Collier Trophy
