= Frank W. Caldwell =

American aircraft engineer

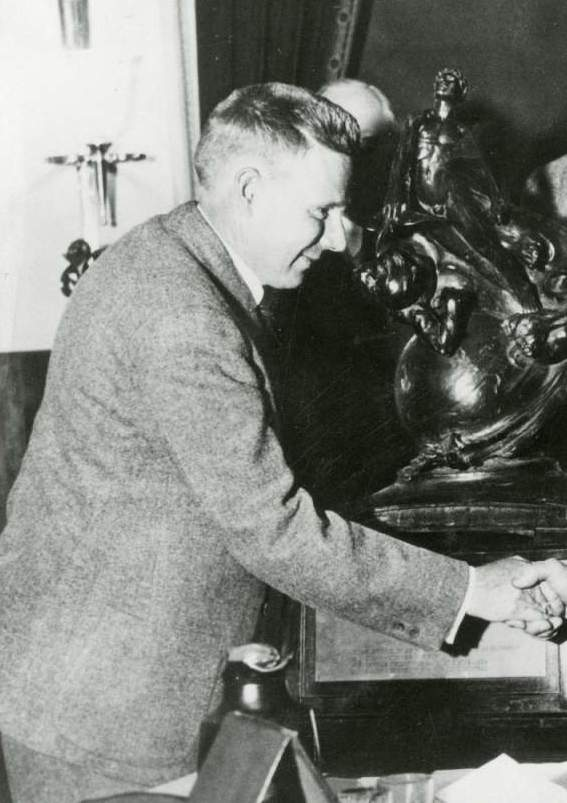
- Frank W. Caldwell being congratulated on winning the 1933 Collier Trophy (visible in the background) for his work with Hamilton Standard on the controllable-pitch propeller.
- Born: December 20, 1889; Lookout Mountain, Tennessee, U.S.
- Died: December 23, 1974 (aged 85); West Hartford, Connecticut, U.S.
- Education: Mechanical engineering (B.S.); University of Virginia; Massachusetts Institute of Technology
- Occupation: Aircraft propeller engineer
- Known for: Variable-pitch propeller
- Spouses: Gertrude Sweigert Heisel; Majorie Snodgrass
- Children: Walter H. Caldwell (1924–2003); Frank W. A. Caldwell (1934–1962)
- Parent(s): Frank Hollis Caldwell; Mary Ellis Nellie Walker
- Awards: Collier Trophy (1933); Sylvanus Albert Reed Award (1935)

Frank Walker Caldwell (1889–1974) was a leading American propeller engineer and designer. As the United States government's chief propeller engineer (1917–1928), he pioneered propeller engineering and propeller testing facilities and techniques. Working at Hamilton Standard Propeller Corporation, they won the 1933 Collier Trophy for his work on the controllable-pitch propeller. After 25 years of service, he retired in 1955 as director of the United Aircraft Corporation Research Division.

== Early life ==
Caldwell was born in Lookout Mountain, Tennessee, to Frank Hollis Caldwell and Mary Ellis Nellie Walker. His father was president of the Cahill Iron Works and mayor of Chattanooga. He attended the Tome Preparatory School in northeast Maryland and the University of Virginia. In 1912, he graduated from the Massachusetts Institute of Technology with a Bachelor of Science degree in mechanical engineering. While at MIT, Caldwell and fellow student Hans Frank Lehmann designed a contest winning glider. At that time, MIT did not offer courses in aeronautics, yet working with Hans Lehmann, Caldwell titled his graduate thesis "Investigation of Air Propellers." After graduation, he worked as foreman and process engineer at Curtiss Aeroplane and Motor Company in Buffalo, New York. In 1916, Caldwell traveled to investigate Army airplane propeller de-lamination at Columbus, New Mexico, near the Mexican border. Realizing that propellers glued in New York delaminated in the southwest heat, he developed a new glue that improved propeller reliability.

== Propeller evolution from World War I ==
During World War I, Caldwell became the chief engineer in the Propeller Research Department of the Airplane Design Section, Aviation Section of the Signal Corps based at McCook Field (1918-1927). While at McCook and Wright Field (1926-1938) he was responsible for all aircraft propeller development. In Ohio, Caldwell designed the whirl test by mounting the subject propeller on a fixed stand to measure thrust, endurance, speed, efficiency, and structural strength. Post war propeller design moved from wood to metal and fixed pitch to variable pitch. Caldwell pushed propeller development to individual detachable blades joined to a central hub allowing, on the ground, pre-flight adjustment of the blades to satisfy performance goals: fine pitch for best climb or coarse pitch for improved cruise performance. Charles A. Lindbergh's 1927 solo transatlantic aircraft the Spirit of St. Louis used a ground only adjustable pitch propeller made by Standard Steel Propeller Company.

== 1933 Collier Trophy ==
In 1929, Caldwell transitioned from the US Army Air Service to the Hamilton Standard Propeller Corporation where he further developed the controllable-pitch propeller. The controllable-pitch or variable-pitch propeller tied together the major aeronautical advances of aerodynamic drag reduction and increased engine power. In 1933, the most modern aircraft in the world, Boeing's Model 247 operated by United Air Lines struggled to reach 6000 feet. After adding Hamilton Standard's hydraulic two position controllable-pitch propeller developed by Caldwell, the Model 247 entered transcontinental service over the Rocky Mountains. The Boeing Model 247 main competitor the Douglas DC-2, also used Caldwell's controllable-pitch propeller.

In 1933 the Collier Trophy was awarded to "Hamilton Standard Aircraft Propeller Co, with particular credit to Frank W Caldwell, Chief Engineer, for development of a controllable-pitch propeller."

In June 1934 President President Franklin D. Roosevelt congratulated Caldwell at the Oval Office for his two position hydraulic controllable-pitch propeller design that won the 1933 Collier Trophy for the year's greatest achievement in American aviation.

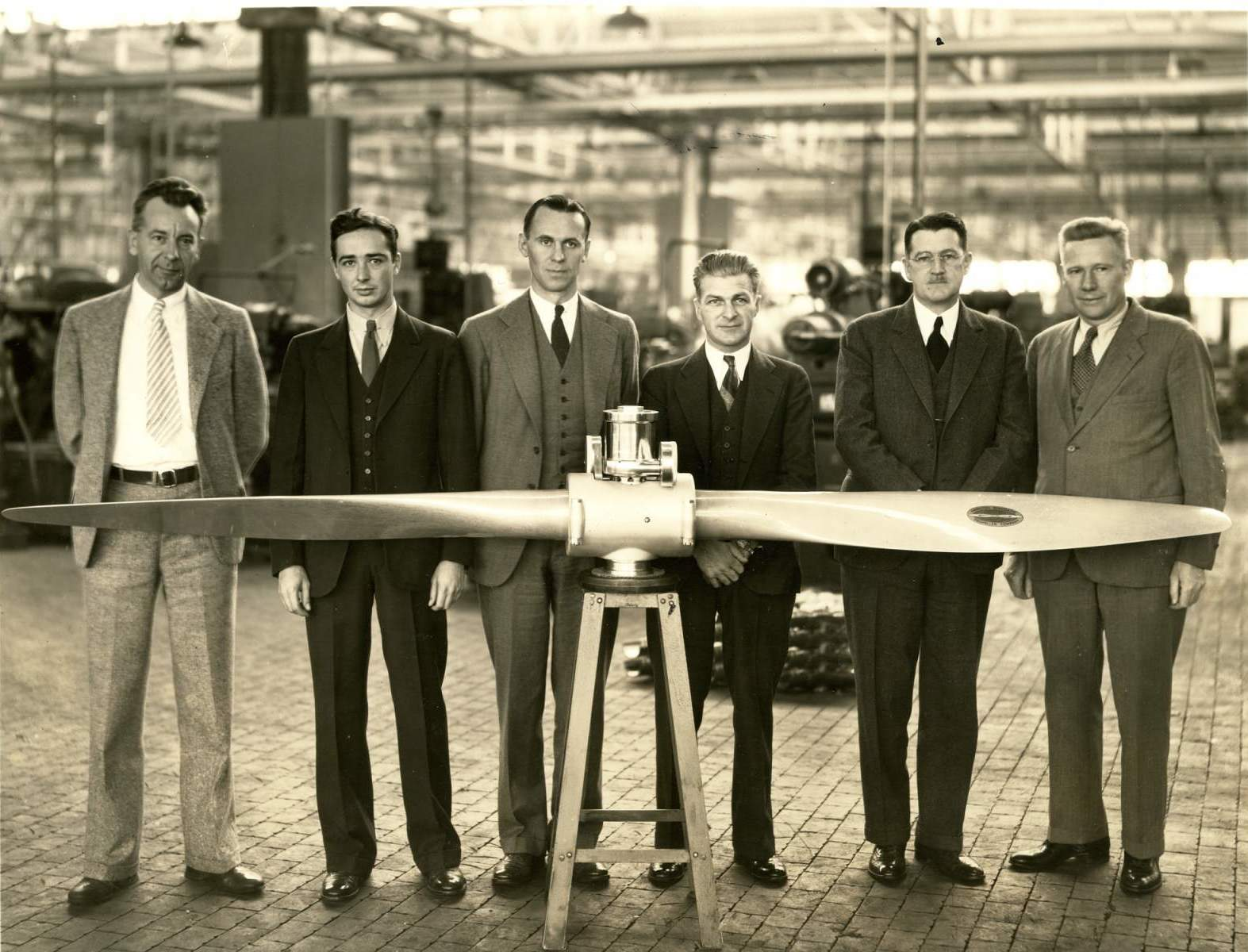
1,000th Controllable Pitch Propeller produced by Hamilton. The 1933 Collier Trophy propeller design team, (Caldwell on the far right).

== Hydromatic constant-speed propeller ==
Caldwell and Hamilton Standard invented the automatic pitch-changing propeller. The hydromatic constant-speed propeller uses hydraulic power (normally engine oil) to change pitch while keeping propeller speed constant. This design included the ability to streamline (feather) the propeller blade reducing drag from propellers on failed engines. Almost all United States Army Air Forces aircraft in World War II used hydromatic constant-speed propellers. The constant-speed propeller was popularly known as the "gearshift of the air." Caldwell and Ernest G. McCauley hold three joint patents for propeller innovations. In 1990, the Hydromatic Propeller, on display at the New England Air Museum of Windsor Locks, was pronounced as an International Historic Mechanical Engineering Landmark by the American Society of Mechanical Engineers.

Prior to Caldwell's hydraulic controllable pitch propeller; [Wallace Rupert Turnbull] a Canadian working in Britain and German engineers focused on mechanical system to change propeller's pitch. Caldwell's hydraulic design, fully developed by 1938, was used in the majority of World War II airplanes. Hamilton Standard produced 500,000 hydraulic controllable pitch propellers for World War II.

Patent: Name, Number, Filed, Issued, Title
Adjustable Pitch Propeller	Pat. No. 1,404,269	Filed: May 5, 1921	Issued: January 24, 1922	Title: Variable-pitch or Reversible Propeller
Hydraulic Propeller	Pat. No. 1,893,612	Filed: May 25, 1929	Issued: January 10, 1933	Title: Propeller
Patent Assignee: Hamilton Standard Propeller Company

== Sylvanus Albert Reed Award (1935) ==
The Institute of Aeronautical Sciences, forerunner to the American Institute of Aeronautics and Astronautics (AIAA), presented Caldwell with the 1935 Sylvanus Albert Reed Award. This annual award recognizes "Experimental or theoretical investigations having a beneficial influence on the development of practical aeronautics". Additionally The Institute granted Caldwell an honorary fellowship in 1946.

== Family and death ==
Caldwell married Gertrude Sweigert Heisel (1896–1977) on September 28, 1918; their son Walter Hollis Caldwell (1924–2003) was born in Dayton, Ohio. He later married Majorie Snodgrass (1897–1976), their son Frank Walker Allen Caldwell (1934–1962) was born in West Hartford, Connecticut.

Caldwell died on December 23, 1974, at age 85.

== Publications ==
- Caldwell, Frank W.; Fales, E. N. (1920). Wind Tunnel Studies in Aerodynamic Phenomena at High Speed (Report). National Advisory Committee for Aeronautics.
- Caldwell, Frank W.; Clay, N. S. (August 1924). Micarta Propellers I: materials (Report). National Advisory Committee for Aeronautics.
- Caldwell, Frank W.; Clay, N. S. (August 1924). Micarta Propellers II : Method of Construction (Report). National Advisory Committee for Aeronautics.
- Caldwell, Frank W.; Clay, N. S. (August 1924). Micarta Propellers III: General Description of the Design (Report). National Advisory Committee for Aeronautics.
- Caldwell, Frank W.; Clay, N. S. (September 1924). Micarta Propellers IV: Technical Methods of Design (Report). National Advisory Committee for Aeronautics.
- Caldwell, Frank W. (1926). "Part 2: Propellers". Aircraft Power Plants. Water ballast recovery. New York: Ronald Press Company.
- Caldwell, Frank W. (1929). "Variable-Pitch Propellers". SAE Transactions. 24: 467–477. JSTOR 44434373.
- Caldwell, Frank W. (August 1934). "Aircraft-Propeller Development and Testing Summarized: Part 1". SAE Transactions. 29: 297–310. JSTOR 44437725.
- Caldwell, Frank W. (September 1934). "Aircraft-Propeller Development and Testing Summarized: Part 2". SAE Transactions. 29: 349–358. JSTOR 44437736.

== See also ==
- Wallace Rupert Turnbull
- Sylvanus Albert Reed
- Earnest G. McCauley
