= Albert Gallup =

American politician (1796–1851)

Member of the U.S. House of Representatives from New York's 10th district
- In office March 4, 1837 – March 3, 1839
- Preceded by: Gerrit Y. Lansing
- Succeeded by: Daniel Barnard

U.S. Collector of Customs for the Port of Albany, New York
- In office 1843–1849
- Preceded by: Thomas McElroy
- Succeeded by: Richard Varick DeWitt

Sheriff of Albany County, New York
- In office November 1831 – November 1834
- Preceded by: Asa Colvard
- Succeeded by: Angus McDuffie

Personal details
- Born: January 30, 1796 Berne, New York, U.S.
- Died: November 30, 1851 (aged 55) Providence, Rhode Island, U.S.
- Resting place: Swan Point Cemetery
- Party: Democratic
- Spouse: Eunice Smith (m. 1818)
- Children: 7 (including Caroline Gallup Reed)
- Profession: Attorney

Albert Gallup (January 30, 1796 – November 5, 1851) was a U.S. representative from New York, serving one term from 1837 to 1839.

== Early life ==
Gallup was born in East Berne, New York to Nathaniel Gallup (1770–1834) and Lucy (née Latham) Gallup (1773–1862).

His ancestors fought in the colonial wars, including, Capt. John Gallup, who was killed in the Narraganset Swamp fight with the Indians, and another, William Latham, who was killed at the Battle of New London.

As a child, Gallup received a limited schooling. He later studied law, was admitted to the bar, and practiced in Albany.

== Career ==
From 1831 to 1834, he served as sheriff of Albany County.

=== Congress ===
Gallup was elected as a Democrat to the Twenty-fifth Congress serving from March 4, 1837, until March 3, 1839. He was an unsuccessful candidate for reelection to the Twenty-sixth Congress in 1838.

He was appointed the U.S. collector of customs for Albany in 1843.

== Personal life ==
On April 26, 1818, he married Eunice Smith (1799–1872), daughter of Capt. Amos Denison Smith and Priscilla Mitchell. Together, they were the parents of:

- Caroline Gallup Reed (1821–1914), who was a noted educator and who married Rev. Sylvanus Reed (1821–1870)
- Albert Smith Gallup (1823–1906), who was a member of the Rhode Island House of Representatives from 1853 to 1854.
- Priscilla Gallup (b. 1828), who married George H. Whitney, in 1852.
- Lucy Gallup (b. 1832), who married Dr. Henry Delavan Paine (1816–1893), in 1858.
- Edwin C. Gallup (b. 1835), who married Anna B. Calket, in 1870.
- Eunice Ida Gallup (1840–1898), who married William W. Rhoades (1837–1893).
- Francis William Gallup (1841–1842), who died young.

Gallup died on November 5, 1851, in Providence, Rhode Island. He was interred in Swan Point Cemetery.

=== Descendants ===
He was the grandfather of Latham Gallup Reed (1855–1945), a prominent New York lawyer, and Anna Dewitt Reed (1858–1958), who married William Barclay Parsons (1859–1932) in 1884.

He was also grandfather of Isabel Whitney, a member of New York Society who married William H. Sage, of "Uplands" in Albany, New York.

Political offices
Preceded by Gerrit Lansing	United States House of Representatives; 1837–1839	Succeeded by Daniel Barnard
