= Cessna 402 =

American light twin-engine aircraft

Cessna 401 / 402
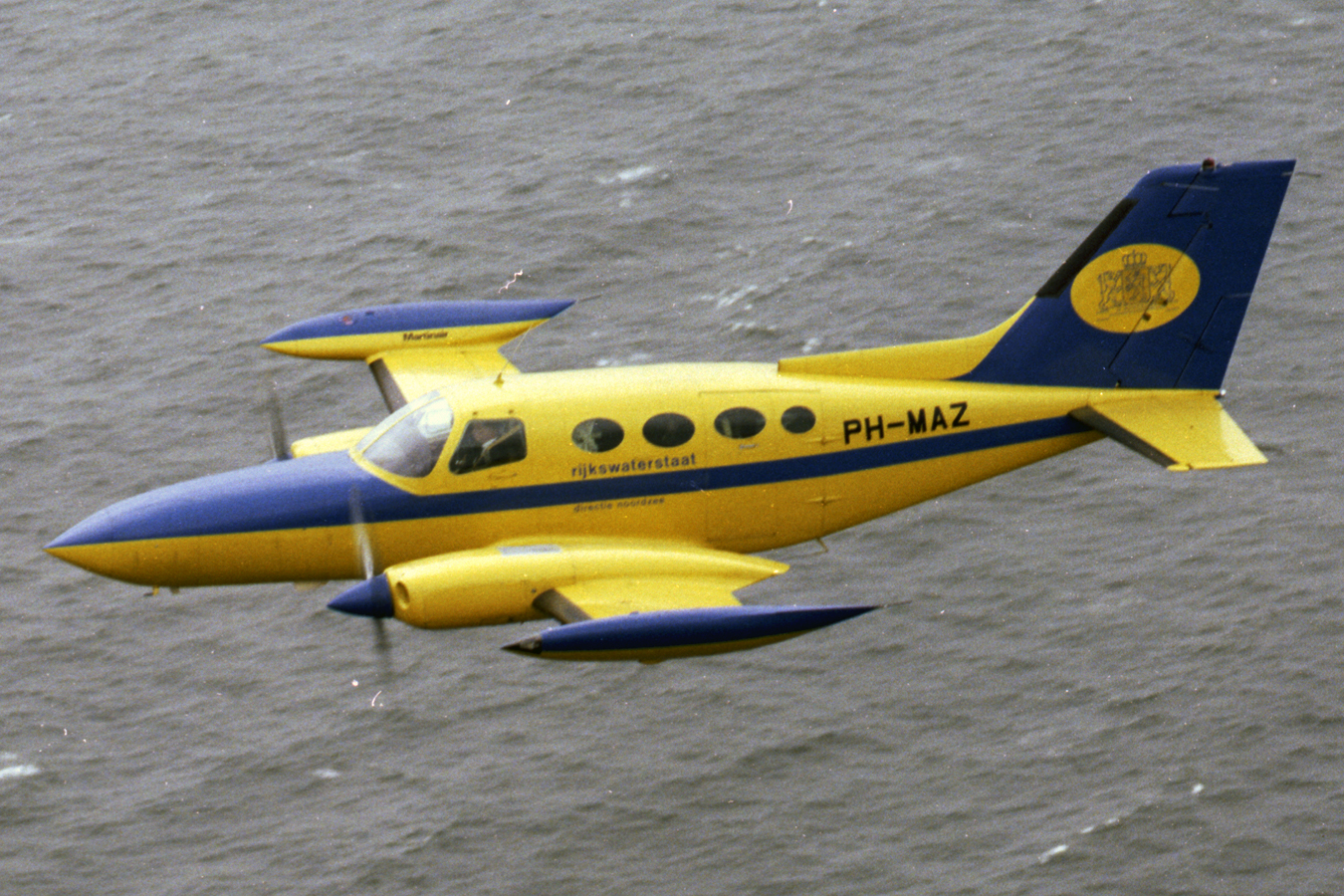
- Rijkswaterstaat Cessna 402

General information
- Type: Corporate transport and airliner
- National origin: United States
- Manufacturer: Cessna
- Status: In service
- Primary user: Cape Air
- Number built: 2,000+

History
- Manufactured: 1966–1985
- Introduction date: 1967
- First flight: August 26, 1965
- Developed from: Cessna 411
- Developed into: Cessna 404 Titan; Cessna 414

The Cessna 401 and 402 are a series of 6 to 10 seat, light twin-piston engine aircraft. All seats are easily removable so that the aircraft can be used in an all-cargo configuration. Neither the Cessna 401 nor the 402 were pressurized, nor were they particularly fast for the installed power. Instead, Cessna intended them to be inexpensive to purchase and operate.

== Design ==
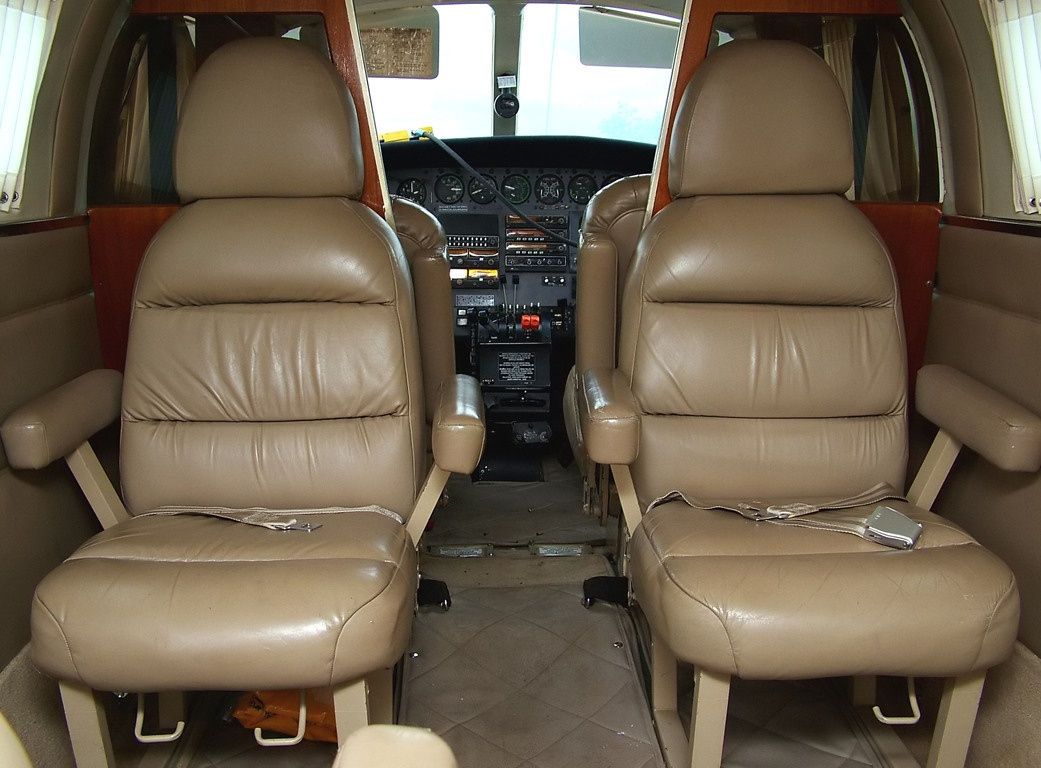
Cabin

The Cessna 401 and 402 were developed to be non-pressurized twin engine piston aircraft. Their goal was to be a workhorse, useful to cargo and small commuter airlines among other users.

The Cessna 401 and 402 were developments of the Cessna 411. One goal for the Cessna 401/402 was to improve upon the very bad single engine handling of the Cessna 411. Another goal was to avoid using the somewhat expensive and maintenance prone geared engines of the Cessna 411.

Cessna 401s and 402s are powered by 300 hp (224 kW) turbocharged Continental engines with three-bladed, constant speed, fully feathering propellers. On later models cruise power was limited to 75% to reduce cabin noise. Some aircraft have a propeller synchrophaser to reduce cabin noise and vibration.

== Development ==
The FAA granted certification to the Cessna 401 in October 1968 and the 402 in January 1969. The original Cessna 402 was introduced in 1967. A version without the large cargo door called the Cessna 401 was produced at the same time. In 1969, the 402's nose was stretched for added baggage space. This model was renamed the 402A. The 401 kept the original nose. In 1970, various minor changes were made. Also, optional larger fuel tanks, of 184 US gallons (700 L; 153 imp gal), became available. This model was called the 402B. By 1971, sales of the 401 had slowed to only 21 planes, so the model was discontinued.

Between 1971 and 1977, many changes were made to the airframe, including an optional engine fire extinguisher (1971), simpler exhaust system (1972), enlarged passenger windows (1973), equipment for flight into known icing conditions (1975), and an optional flushing toilet (1977).

In 1976, the very similar Cessna 421 was produced with a new wing, no tip tanks, and a simpler fuel system. The Cessna 414 was given a clean wing in 1978.

In 1979, the 402s received a new wing, with a 5 feet (1.5 m) greater span. The landing gear was replaced, using the simpler system from the Cessna 414. The landing gear track was also increased by 4 feet (1.2 m). The engines' output was boosted to 325 hp (242 kW) each and max gross weight increased to 6,850 pounds (3,110 kg), creating a much more useful airplane. Fuel capacity was increased to 213 US gallons (810 L; 177 imp gal). Even with the weight increase, single-engine performance improved and the stall speed decreased by a couple of knots. After this change, the plane was named the Cessna 402C.

Production stopped after the 1985 model year.

=== Modifications ===
In 1969, American Jet Industries began work on a turboprop-powered conversion of the Cessna 402, named the Turbo Star 402, using Allison 250-B17 engines. The prototype flew on June 10, 1970. Further modifications providing increased fuel capacity, higher gross weight, and lower minimum control speed were carried out in 1974 and the modification was re-certified. Scenic Airlines of Las Vegas purchased rights to the design in 1977.

The Cessna 402C may be outfitted with vortex generators to increase maximum allowable takeoff weight to 7,210 lb (3,270 kg), with a zero-fuel weight of 6,750 lb (3,062 kg).

Another modification for the 402C increases the maximum landing weight to 7,200 lb (3,266 kg), which allows commercial operators to fly with an increased payload on shorter routes.

Hendrik Venter of DMI engineering created the Falcon 402: a converted Cessna 402 fitted with a single Walter M601D turboprop in the nose and replacing the two piston engines in the wings with new fuel tanks. The nose was lengthened in order to correct the centre of gravity. It has an increased payload and top speed and can use shorter runways.

== Variants ==
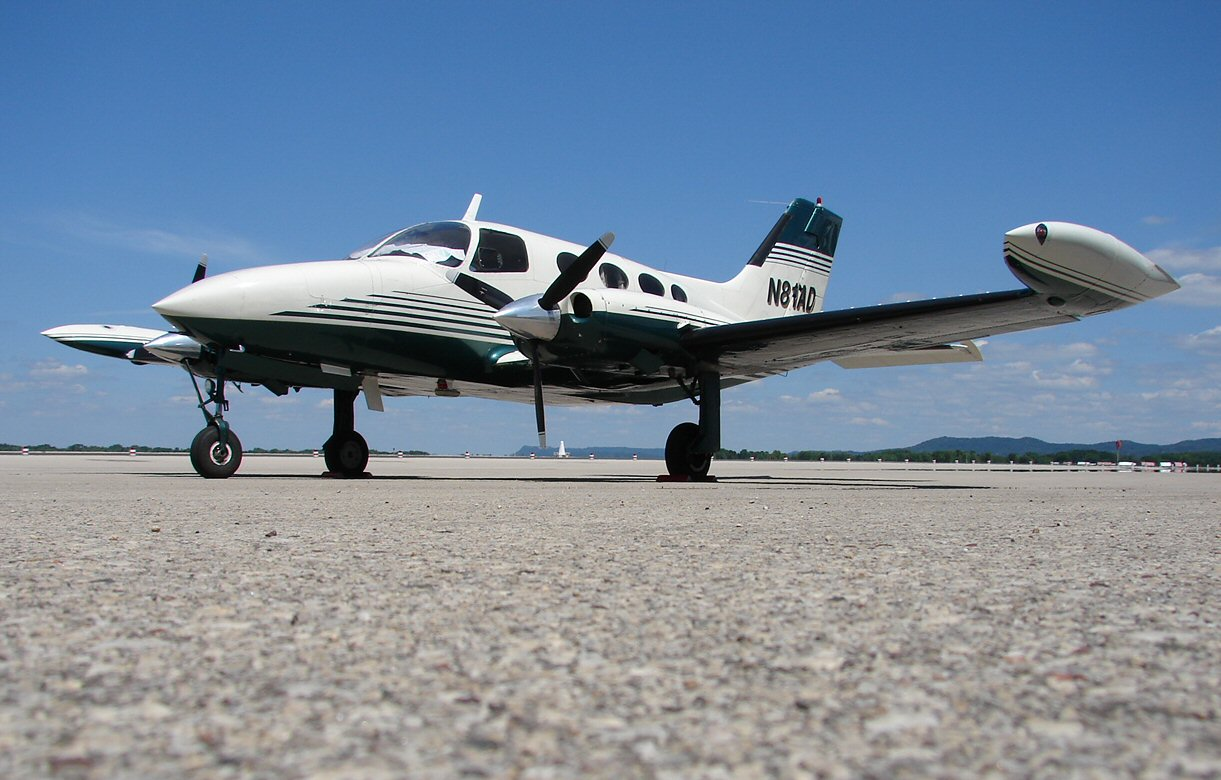
Early models have four oval windows, a short nose and tip tanks.

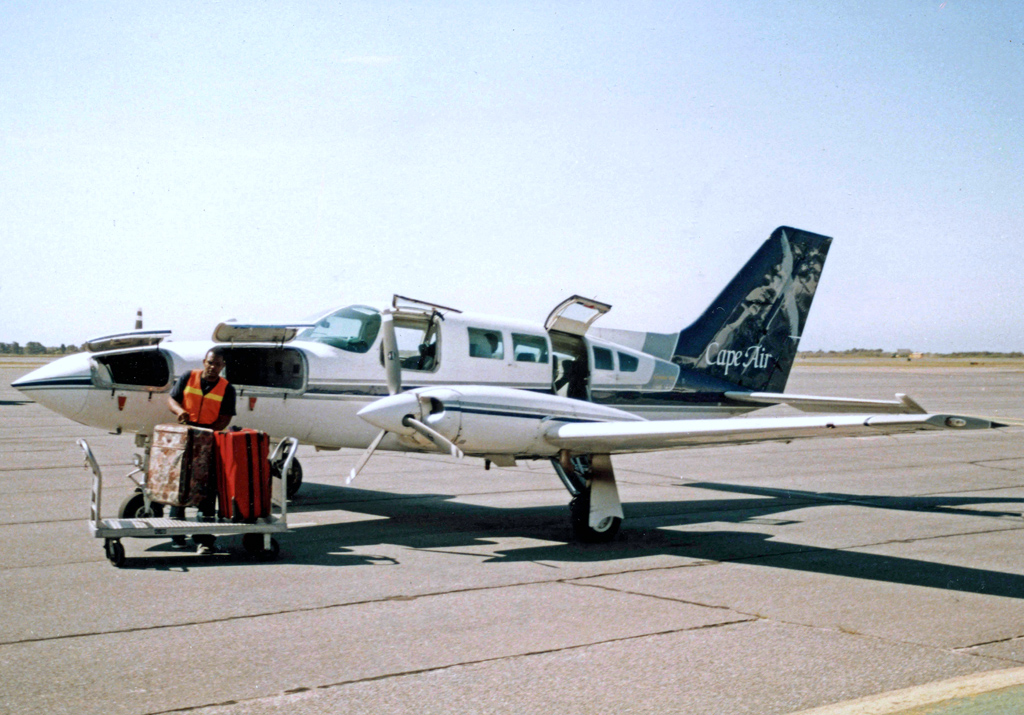
Later 402Cs have five windows, a longer nose for luggage and no tip tanks.

This family of aircraft was built in several versions:

401
Six to eight seat interior, intended for corporate transport. Produced 1966–1972. The replacement for the 401 in the corporate transport role was the 402 Businessliner variant. Certified September 20, 1966.
401A
A 401 with minor changes. Certified October 29, 1968.
401B
A 401A with minor changes, later replaced by the 402B. Certified November 12, 1969.
402
A 401 with either a utility (for freight) or nine-seat commuter use. Certified September 20, 1966. Originally designated Model 360.
402A
A 402 with a baggage compartment in lengthened nose and an optional crew entry door. Certified January 3, 1969.
402B Utiliner/Businessliner
402A with minor changes, from 1972 had increased cabin volume and five windows each side. Certified November 12, 1969.
- Utiliner version has a ten-seat interior intended for commuter airline operations.
- Businessliner version has a six to eight-seat interior with executive seating intended for corporate transport.
402C Utiliner/Businessliner
402B with Continental TSIO-520-VB 325 hp engines, increased takeoff weight, longer wingspan without main tip tanks and hydraulic instead of electric landing gear. Certified September 25, 1978.

== Operators ==
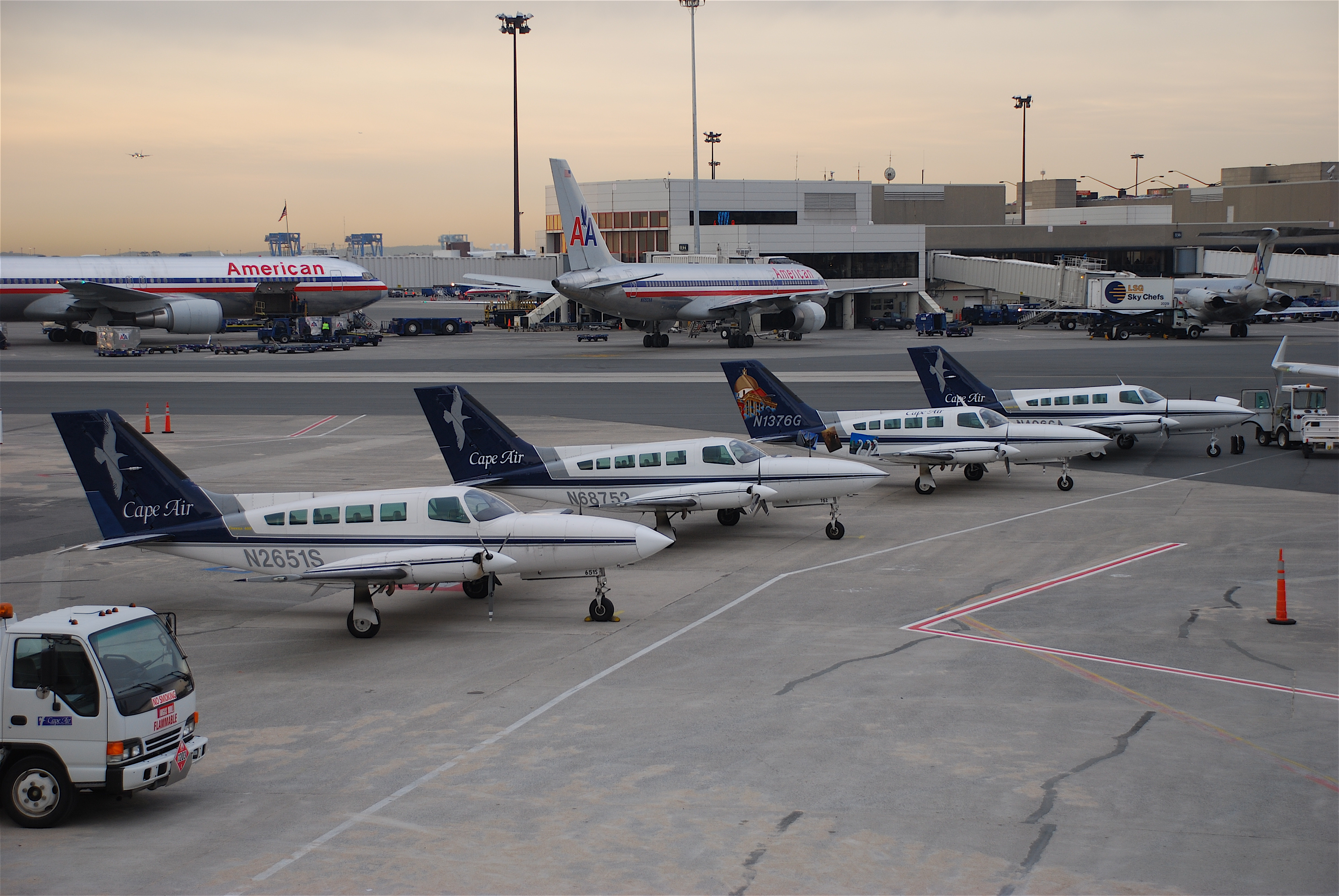
Cape Air Cessna 402Cs at Boston Logan in 2008

=== Civilian ===
The Cessna 402 has proven to be very dependable over the years, which, along with its range and passenger capacity, has made it a popular choice for many small regional airlines worldwide. The aircraft are generally flown on short, thin routes to hubs where passengers can connect to higher density routes.

The largest operator of the type is Cape Air, which as of March 2024 has a fleet of 64 Cessna 402s operating in the Caribbean, Micronesia and the United States.

=== Military ===
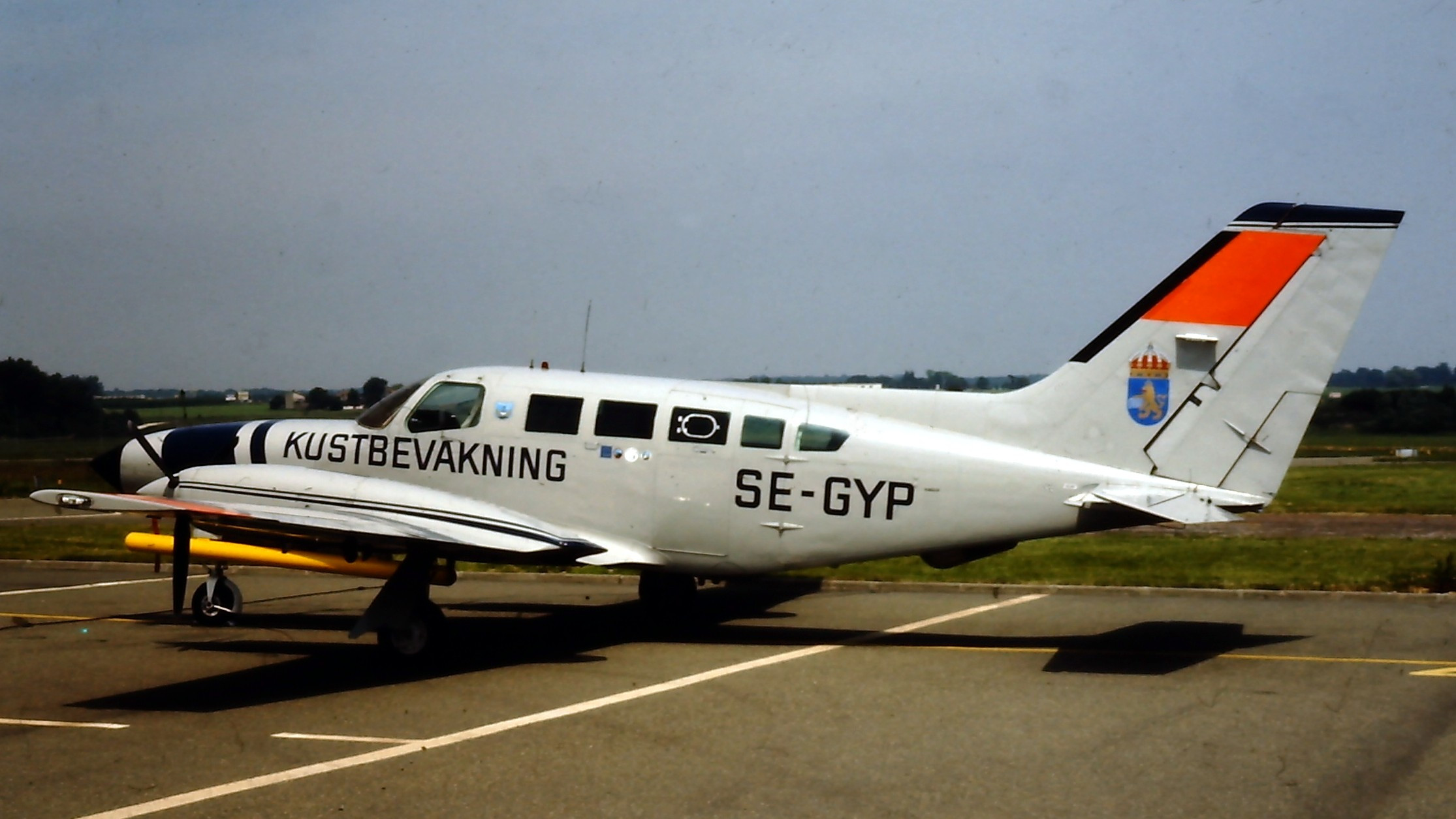
A Cessna 402C of the Swedish Coast Guard in 1981

Bahamas

- Royal Bahamas Defence Force. Retired as of 2026.

Barbados

- Barbados Defence Force

Bolivia

- Bolivian Air Force - 1 Cessna 402 in service as of December 2020.
- Bolivian Naval Force

Colombia

- Colombian Air Force - 1 Cessna 402 in service as of December 2020

Comoros

- Comoros Police Defence Air Wing

Finland

- Finnish Air Force two aircraft, former operator

Haiti

- Haiti Air Corps

Honduras

- Honduran Air Force - operated one Cessna 401 as of 1993.

Indonesia

- Indonesian Air Force - operated five Cessna 401A and two Cessna 402A. Retired in late 1989.

Malaysia

- Royal Malaysian Air Force

Mexico

- Mexican Navy

Nicaragua

- Contras

Paraguay

- Paraguayan Navy - One Cessna 401 in service 2003.

Portugal

- Portuguese Air Force – One 402B operated 1968–1974.

Trinidad and Tobago

- Trinidad and Tobago Defence Force – One 401 operated 1986.

Venezuela

- Venezuelan Navy
- Venezuelan National Guard – One 402C operated 1986.

== Accidents and incidents ==
American R&B singer Aaliyah died along with eight others, including the pilot, two hairstylists, a makeup artist, a bodyguard, and three record label professionals, when a Cessna 402B registered N8097W operated by Blackhawk International Airways, crashed shortly after takeoff on August 25, 2001, around 6:50 p.m. local time, in Marsh Harbour, Abaco Islands, The Bahamas. The main cause of the crash was determined to be an improperly loaded aircraft, which was approximately 700 pounds (320 kg) over its maximum takeoff weight, with a center of gravity well aft of the envelope. Investigators discovered that the pilot was unlicensed at the time of the crash and had traces of cocaine and alcohol in his system. Blackhawk surrendered its operating certificate to the FAA. Aaliyah's family later filed a wrongful death lawsuit against Blackhawk, which was settled out of court.

On September 9, 2021, a Cessna 402C crashed after a failed go-around attempt at Provincetown Municipal Airport. The plane was severely damaged but there were no casualties.

On January 8, 2025, a Cessna 402C operated by Pacifica Aviation (officially Pacifica de Aviación) carrying ten people (two crew, eight passengers) flying from Juradó Airport to Medellín-Enrique Olaya Herrera Airport in Colombia crashed into a wooded mountainside, killing all on board.

On July 10, 2026, a Cessna 402C Utiliner III operated by Flamingo Air crashed shortly before landing at San Andros Airport killing all ten people on board resulting in the deadliest plane crash in the history of The Bahamas.

== Specifications (402C Businessliner) ==
3-view line drawing of the Cessna 401C

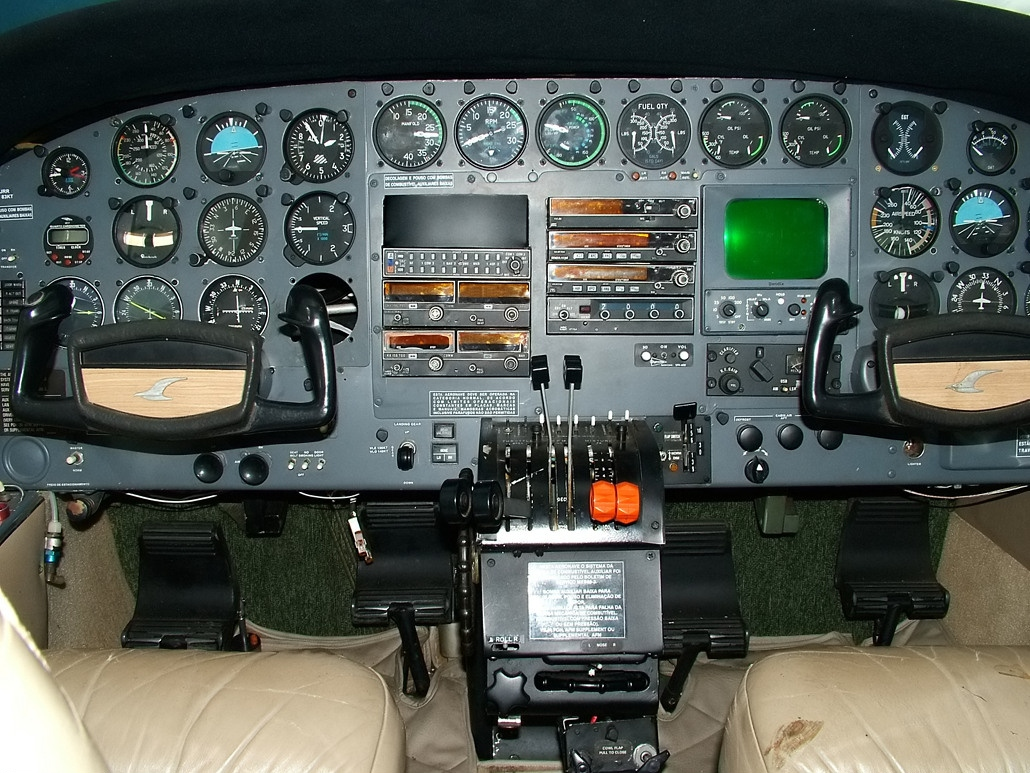
Flight deck

Data from Jane's All the World's Aircraft 1982–83

General characteristics

- Crew: Two pilots
- Capacity: Six passengers
- Length: 36 ft 4 1/2 in (11.09 m)
- Wingspan: 44 ft 1 1/2 in (13.45 m)
- Height: 11 ft 5 1/2 in (3.49 m)
- Wing area: 225.8 sq ft (20.98 m^{2})
- Airfoil: NACA 23018 (root) NACA 23015 (tip)
- Empty weight: 4,077 lb (1,849 kg)
- Max takeoff weight: 6,850 lb (3,107 kg)
- Fuel capacity: 206 US gal (172 imp gal; 780 L) usable fuel
- Powerplant: 2 × Continental TSIO-520-VB air-cooled turbocharged flat-six engines, 325 hp (242 kW) each
- Propellers: 3-bladed McCauley 0850334-34 constant speed propeller

Performance

- Maximum speed: 231 kn (266 mph, 428 km/h) at 16,000 ft (4,900 m)
- Cruise speed: 142 kn (163 mph, 263 km/h) at 10,000 ft (3,000 m) (econ cruise)
- Stall speed: 68 kn (78 mph, 126 km/h) (flaps down, power off) (CAS)
- Never exceed speed: 231 kn (266 mph, 428 km/h) (CAS)
- Range: 1,273 nmi (1,465 mi, 2,358 km) at 10,000 ft (3,000 m), econ cruise
- Service ceiling: 26,900 ft (8,200 m)
- Rate of climb: 1,450 ft/min (7.4 m/s)
- Takeoff distance to 50 ft (15m): 2,195 ft (669 m)
- Landing distance from 50 ft (15m): 2,485 ft (757 m)

== See also ==
Aircraft of comparable role, configuration, and era

- Piper PA-31 Navajo

Related lists

- List of civil aircraft
