= Synchronization (alternating current) =

Process in power generation

In an alternating current (AC) electric power system, synchronization is the process of matching the frequency, phase and voltage of a generator or other source to an electrical grid in order to transfer power. If two unconnected segments of a grid are to be connected to each other, they cannot safely exchange AC power until they are synchronized.

A direct current (DC) generator can be connected to a power network simply by adjusting its open-circuit terminal voltage to match the network's voltage, by adjusting either its speed or its field excitation. The exact engine speed is not critical. However, an AC generator must additionally match its timing (frequency and phase) to the network voltage, which requires both speed and excitation to be systematically controlled for synchronization. This extra complexity was one of the arguments against AC operation during the war of currents in the 1880s. In modern grids, synchronization of generators is carried out by automatic systems.

== Conditions ==
There are five conditions that must be met to achieve synchronization. The source (generator or sub-network) must have equal root-mean-square voltage, frequency, phase sequence, phase angle, and waveform to that of the system to which it is being synchronized.

Waveform and phase sequence are fixed by the construction of the generator and its connections to the system. During installation of a generator, careful checks are made to ensure the generator terminals and all control wiring is correct so that the order of phases (phase sequence) matches the system. Connecting a generator with the wrong phase sequence will result in large, possibly damaging, currents as the system voltages are opposite to those of the generator terminal voltages.

The voltage, frequency and phase angle must be controlled each time a generator is to be connected to a grid.

Generating units for connection to a power grid have an inherent droop speed control that allows them to share load proportional to their rating. Some generator units, especially in isolated systems, operate with isochronous frequency control, maintaining constant system frequency independent of load.

== Process ==
The sequence of events is similar for manual and automatic synchronization. The generator is brought up to approximate synchronous speed by supplying more energy to its shaft – for example, opening the valves of a steam turbine, opening the gates of a hydraulic turbine, or increasing the throttle setting of a diesel engine. The field of the generator is energized and the voltage at the terminals of the generator is observed and compared with the system. The voltage magnitude must be the same as the system voltage.

If one machine is slightly out of phase it will pull into step with the others but, if the phase difference is large, there will be heavy cross-currents which can cause voltage fluctuations and, in extreme cases, damage to the machines.

=== Synchronizing lamps ===
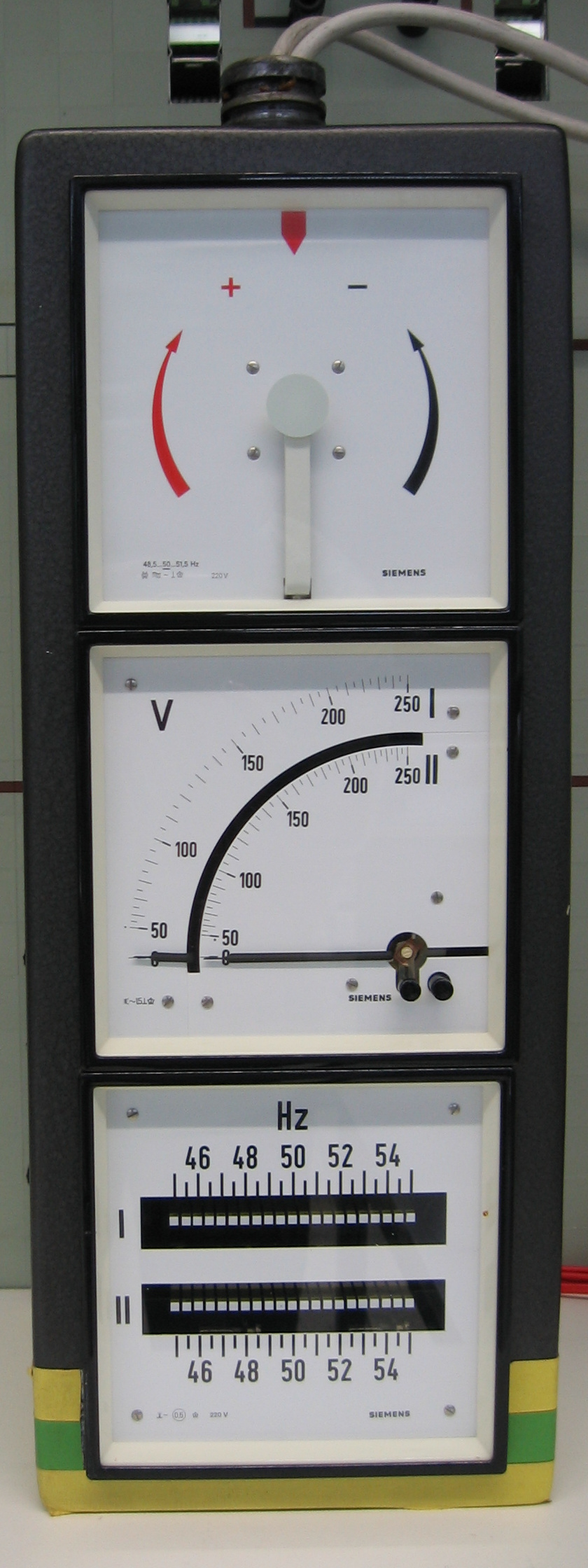
From top to bottom: synchroscope, voltmeter, frequency meter. When the two systems are synchronized, the pointer on the synchrosope is stationary and points straight up.

Formerly, three incandescent light bulbs were connected between the generator terminals and the system terminals (or more generally, to the terminals of instrument transformers connected to generator and system). As the generator speed changes, the lights will flicker at the beat frequency proportional to the difference between generator frequency and system frequency. When the voltage at the generator is opposite to the system voltage (either ahead or behind in phase), the lamps will be bright. When the voltage at the generator matches the system voltage, the lights will be dark. At that instant, the circuit breaker connecting the generator to the system may be closed and the generator will then stay in synchronism with the system.

An alternative technique used a similar scheme to the above except that the connections of two of the lamps were swapped either at the generator terminals or the system terminals. In this scheme, when the generator was in synchronism with the system, one lamp would be dark, but the two with the swapped connections would be of equal brightness. Synchronizing on "dark" lamps was preferred over "bright" lamps because it was easier to discern the minimum brightness. However, a lamp burnout could give a false-positive for successful synchronization.

=== Synchroscope ===
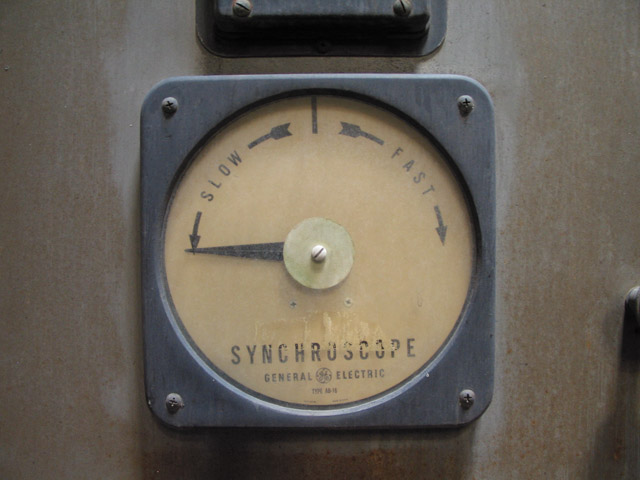
This synchroscope was used to synchronize a factory's power plant with the utility's power grid.

Another manual method of synchronization relies on observing an instrument called a "synchroscope", which displays the relative frequencies of system and generator. The pointer of the synchroscope will indicate "fast" or "slow" speed of the generator with respect to the system. To minimize the transient current when the generator circuit breaker is closed, usual practice is to initiate the close as the needle slowly approaches the in-phase point. An error of a few electrical degrees between system and generator will result in a momentary inrush and abrupt speed change of the generator.

=== Synchronizing relays ===
Synchronizing relays allow unattended synchronization of a machine with a system. Today these are digital microprocessor instruments, but in the past electromechanical relay systems were applied. A synchronizing relay is useful to remove human reaction time from the process, or when a human is not available such as at a remote controlled generating plant. Synchroscopes or lamps are sometimes installed as a supplement to automatic relays, for possible manual use or for monitoring the generating unit.

Sometimes as a precaution against out-of-step connection of a machine to a system, a "synchro check" relay is installed that prevents closing the generator circuit breaker unless the machine is within a few electrical degrees of being in-phase with the system. Synchro check relays are also applied in places where several sources of supply may be connected and where it is important that out-of-step sources are not accidentally paralleled.

== Synchronous operation ==
While the generator is synchronized, the frequency of the system will change depending on load and the average characteristics of all the generating units connected to the grid. Large changes in system frequency can cause the generator to fall out of synchronism with the system. Protective devices on the generator will operate to disconnect it automatically.

== Synchronous speeds ==
Synchronous speeds for synchronous motors and alternators depend on the number of poles on the machine and the frequency of the supply.

The relationship between the supply frequency, f, the number of poles, p, and the synchronous speed (speed of rotating field), n_{s} is given by:

$$f = \frac{pn_s}{120\ }$$.

In the following table, frequencies are shown in hertz (Hz) and rotational speeds in revolutions per minute (rpm):

No. of poles	Speed (rpm) at 50 Hz	Speed (rpm) at 60 Hz
2	3,000	3,600
4	1,500	1,800
6	1,000	1,200
8	750	900
10	600	720
12	500	600
14	429	514
16	375	450
18	333	400
20	300	360
22	273	327
24	250	300
26	231	277
28	214	257
30	200	240

== See also ==
- Phase synchronization
- High-voltage direct current: allows power transmission between AC transmission systems that are not synchronized

== Sources ==
- The Electrical Year Book 1937, published by Emmott and Company Limited, Manchester, England, pp 53–57 and 72
