= R&D Dynamics Corporation =

American aerospace and energy company

R&D Dynamics
- Company type: Private
- Industry: Research, Design, and manufacturing
- Founded: 1990
- Founders: Dr. Giri Agrawal
- Headquarters: Bloomfield, Connecticut, United States
- Products: Energy-efficient and reliable turbomachinery

R&D Dynamics is a Connecticut-based aerospace and energy company involves in research, design, development, and production of turbomachinery that does not use oil and is energy efficient.

It was founded in 1990 by Dr. Giri Agrawal while he was working in Garrett Air Research and Hamilton Standard. Dr. Agrawal received the George Mead Medal for his air bearing development work.

R&D Dynamics selected by Airbus UpNext to supply fuel cell compressors.

== Awards ==
- Department of Energy (DOE) awarded the grant to R&D Dynamics under the Renewable Energy Research and Development Program.
- Indefinite Delivery Vehicle awards by DLA Aviation and DLA Land and Maritime
- Prime Contract awards by DLA Land and Maritime
