= Daniel D. Barnard =

American politician and diplomat

Daniel Dewey Barnard
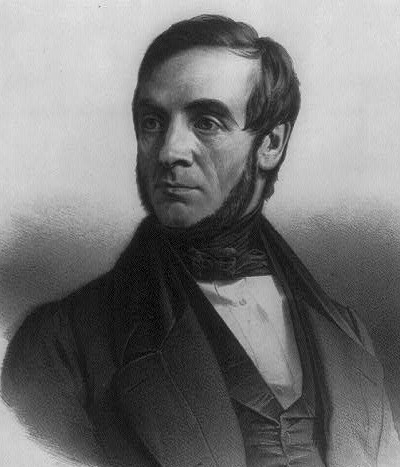

United States Envoy to Prussia
- In office September 3, 1850 – September 21, 1853
- Preceded by: Edward A. Hannegan
- Succeeded by: Peter D. Vroom

Member of the U.S. House of Representatives New York
- In office March 4, 1839 – March 3, 1845
- Preceded by: Albert Gallup
- Succeeded by: Bradford R. Wood
- Constituency: 10th district (1839–43); 13th district (1843–45)
- In office March 4, 1827 – March 3, 1829
- Preceded by: Moses Hayden
- Succeeded by: Timothy Childs
- Constituency: 27th district

Chair of the House Judiciary Committee
- In office 1841–1843
- Preceded by: John Sergeant
- Succeeded by: William Wilkins

Personal details
- Born: July 16, 1797 Sheffield, Massachusetts, U.S.
- Died: April 24, 1861 (aged 63)
- Citizenship: United States
- Party: Adams Whig
- Spouse: Sara Livingstone Barnard Catherine Walsh Barnard
- Education: Williams College
- Profession: lawyer politician

Daniel Dewey Barnard (July 16, 1797 – April 24, 1861) was an American politician and a U.S. representative from New York.

== Biography ==
Born in Sheffield, Massachusetts, Barnard was the son of Timothy and Phebe (Dewey) Barnard. He attended the common schools and graduated from Williams College, Williamstown, Massachusetts, in 1818. He studied law and was admitted to the bar in 1821. He married Sara Livingstone in 1825; and married Catherine Walsh in 1832. He received the degree of LL.D. from Hobart College in 1834, Columbia in 1845, and Brown in 1853. He was also a member of the New-York Historical Society.

== Career ==
Barnard began practice in Rochester, New York, and was elected district attorney of Monroe County in 1826.

Elected as an Adams to the Twentieth Congress, Barnard served as U.S. Representative for the twenty-seventh district of New York from March 4, 1827, to March 3, 1829. He was an unsuccessful candidate for reelection in 1828 to the Twenty-first Congress. He traveled in Europe in 1831, and moved to Albany, New York, in 1832 and continued the practice of law. He served as a member of the state assembly in 1838.

Barnard was elected as a Whig to the 26th, 27th and 28th United States Congresses, holding office from March 4, 1839, to March 3, 1845. He served as chairman of the Committee on the Judiciary (Twenty-seventh Congress). As a leading intellectual in the Whig party, Barnard gave a number of speeches, including to the literary societies of Amherst College in 1839 and to Yale Phi Beta Kappa Society in 1846.

Not a candidate for reelection in 1844, Barnard resumed his practice. He was appointed Envoy to Prussia and served from September 3, 1850, to September 21, 1853. He retired from active business pursuits in 1853 and engaged in literary pursuits, residing in Albany, New York.

== Death ==
Barnard died in Albany, New York, on April 24, 1861 (age 63 years, 282 days). He is interred at Albany Rural Cemetery, Menands, New York, where he had given the dedication address in 1844.

== Bibliography ==
- Penney, Sherry. Patrician in Politics: Daniel Dewey Barnard of New York. Port Washington, N.Y.: Kennikat Press, 1974.

U.S. House of Representatives
| Preceded by Moses Hayden | Member of the U.S. House of Representatives from New York's 27th congressional district 1827–1829 | Succeeded by Timothy Childs |
| Preceded by Albert Gallup | Member of the U.S. House of Representatives from New York's 10th congressional district 1839–1843 | Succeeded by Jeremiah Russell |
| Preceded by Thomas A. Tomlinson | Member of the U.S. House of Representatives from New York's 13th congressional district 1843–1845 | Succeeded by Bradford R. Wood |
Diplomatic posts
| Preceded by Edward A. Hannegan | U.S. Minister to Prussia; 1850–1853 | Succeeded by Peter D. Vroom |
