= Sylvanus Albert Reed =

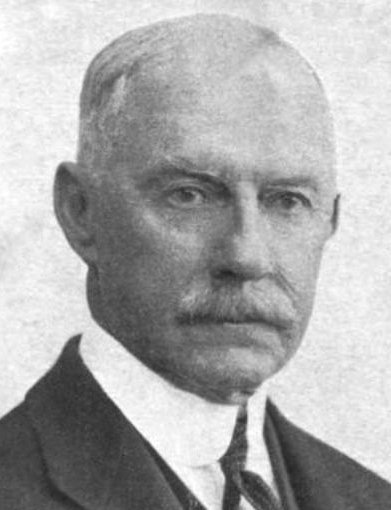
- Born: April 8, 1854; Albany, New York, US
- Died: October 1, 1935 (aged 81); New York City, US
- Resting place: All Saints' Memorial Church Cemetery, Navesink New Jersey; Latitude: 40.39812, Longitude: -74.02139
- Education: A.B. and Ph.D. Columbia College, M.E School of Mines
- Spouse: Elmina Wilshire Pomeroy (m. 1895; died 1897)
- Parents: Sylvanus Reed (father); Caroline Gallup Reed (mother)
- Relatives: Anna Reed (sister); William Barclay Parsons (brother-in-law)

Sylvanus Albert Reed (April 8, 1854 – October 1, 1935) was an American aeronautical engineer who developed the modern metal aircraft propeller.

== Early life and career ==
Reed graduated from Columbia University in 1874. He worked as an engineer specializing in electrical signals for railroad safety until his retirement in 1912.

== Later career ==
In 1915, Reed experimented with metal propellers using a 10 hp electric engine driving propellers up to 19,000 rpm. He researched propeller shapes and materials that could withstand tip speed up to Mach 1.35. In 1920, the local police encouraged him to move his experiments from his attic and rented a shop at the Curtiss aircraft company's Garden City factory. He invented the Reed Metal Propeller, testing it in August 1921 on a Curtiss K-6 powered Standard. It was developed for use on the PW-8 and Curtiss D-12 powered Hawk. He won the 1925 Collier Trophy for his development of the Reed Aeronautic Propeller. In December 1934 Reed donated an endowment to the Institute of Aeronautical Sciences creating an annual award for the winner of "Experimental or theoretical investigations have a beneficial influence on the development of practical aeronautics".

In 1881 he became a hereditary member of the Rhode Island Society of the Cincinnati. Reed died at his home in New York City on October 1, 1935, and was buried at All Saints' Memorial Church Cemetery in Navesink, New Jersey.
