= Cessna 411 =

American light twin-engine aircraft

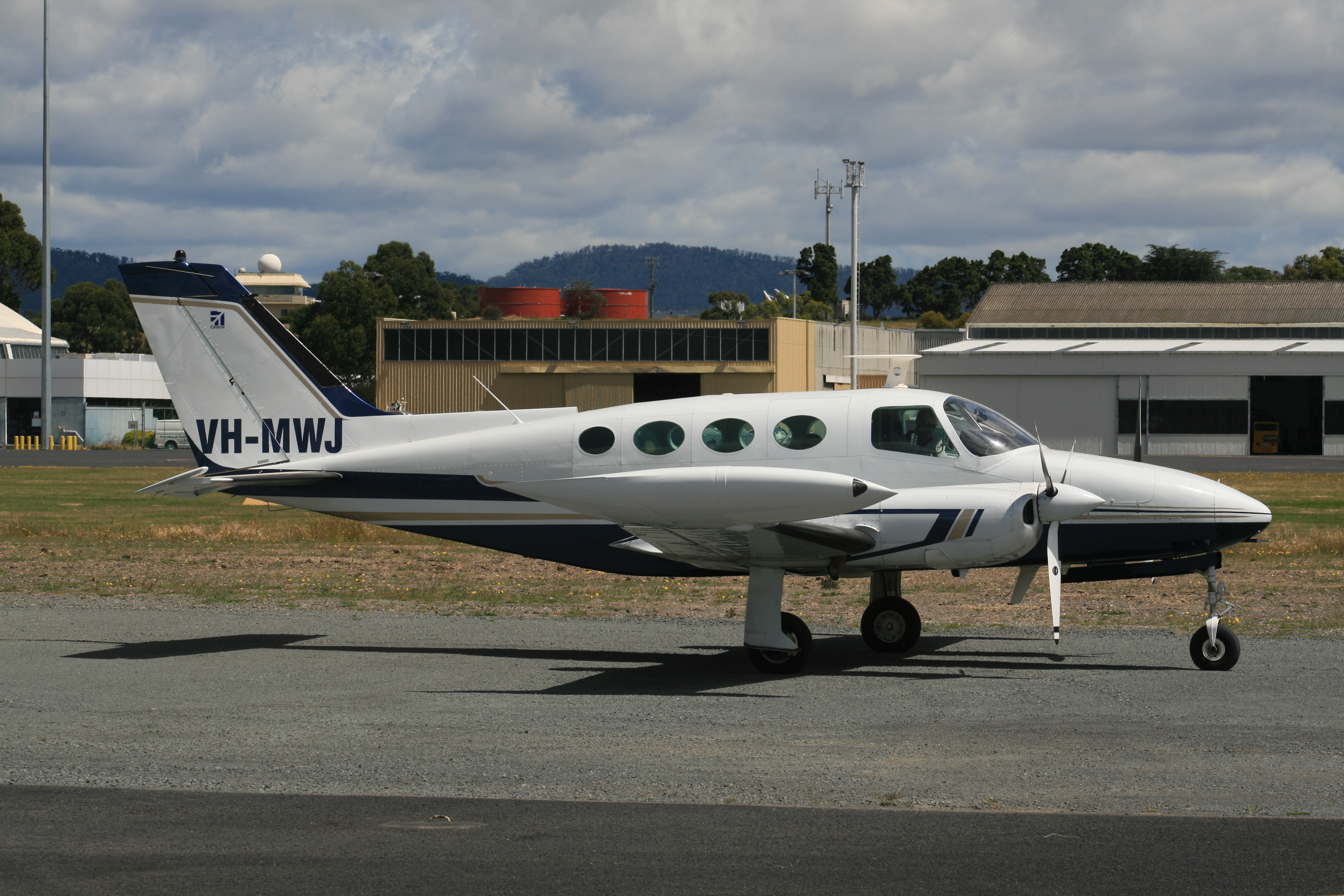
- Cessna 411A

General information
- Type: Light business/cargo aircraft
- National origin: United States
- Manufacturer: Cessna
- Number built: 302

History
- Manufactured: 1962-1968
- First flight: July 18, 1962
- Developed from: Cessna 310
- Developed into: Cessna 401/402; Cessna 421

The Cessna Model 411 is an American twin-engined, propeller-driven, non-pressurized light aircraft built by Cessna Aircraft. It was that company's largest business aircraft to enter production when it first flew in 1962.

== Design and development ==
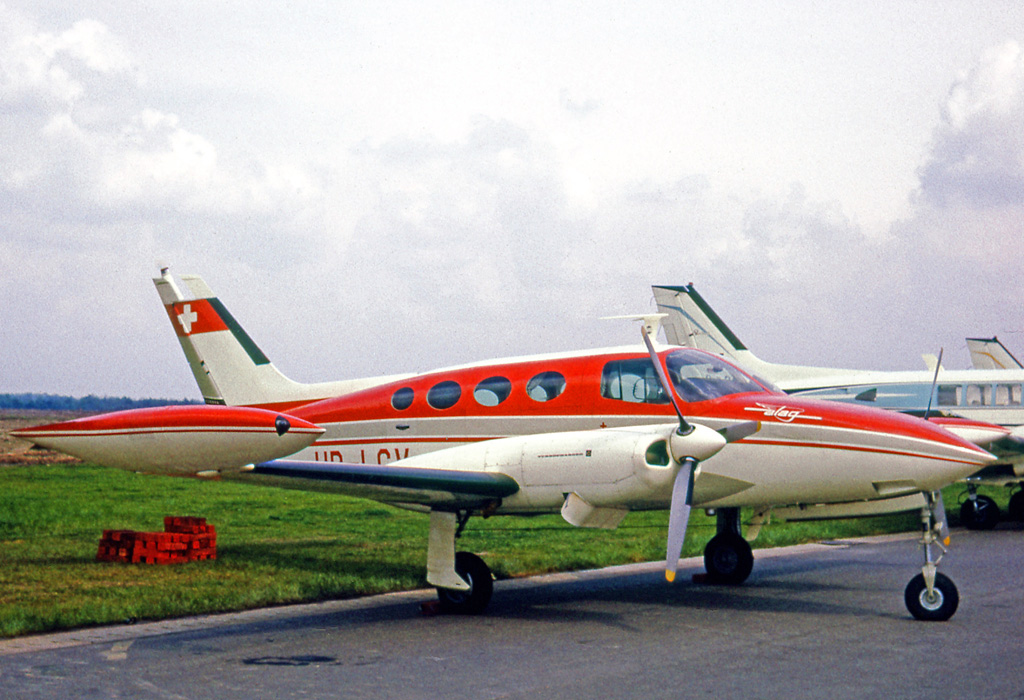
Early Cessna 411 from Switzerland fitted with the shorter nose

The 411 is an eight-seat low-wing twin-engined cabin-class monoplane with retractable landing gear, non-pressurized cabin, and an airstair entrance door, which first flown on 18 July 1962. It has two 340 hp (254 kW) Continental GTSIO-520-C engines with three-bladed propellers. During 1965 Cessna developed two generally similar and lower-cost versions, the Model 401 and Model 402. Production of the 411 finished in 1968 whilst a pressurized version of the 411 was developed as the Cessna 421.

== Variants ==
Cessna 411
Production variant, obtained type certificate awarded in 1964, 252-built.
Cessna 411A
A 411 with larger nose baggage capacity but the same overall length fuselage and optional tanks in engine nacelles, type certificate awarded in 1967, 50 built.
B.PhTh.1
(Thai: บ.ผท.๑) Royal Thai Armed Forces designation for the 411A.

== Operators ==
=== Military operators ===
France
French Air and Space Force - Six 411s were delivered between 1966 and 1969 as communications aircraft, the four surviving aircraft were transferred to the CEV in 1973 and 1974. Two were used by Groupe de Liaisons Aériennes Ministérielles for VIP transport duties.

== Accidents and incidents ==
- On July 9, 1981, at 9:56 pm, on a flight from Ozark, Alabama to Augusta, Georgia, a Cessna 411 crashed in a residential area while trying to make an emergency landing at Columbus, Georgia. The pilot, the sole occupant, had only 25 total flying hours and was not rated for instrument flight. There was one fatality.
- On 16 December 1982, a Cessna 411 crashed into a bookstore in Montgomery, Ohio, on approach to land at the airport, killing the six people on board and injuring four more on the ground. One of those killed was Carl Johnson, who had embezzled $614,000 and was planning to lead authorities to the location of a buried portion of the money.

== Specifications ==
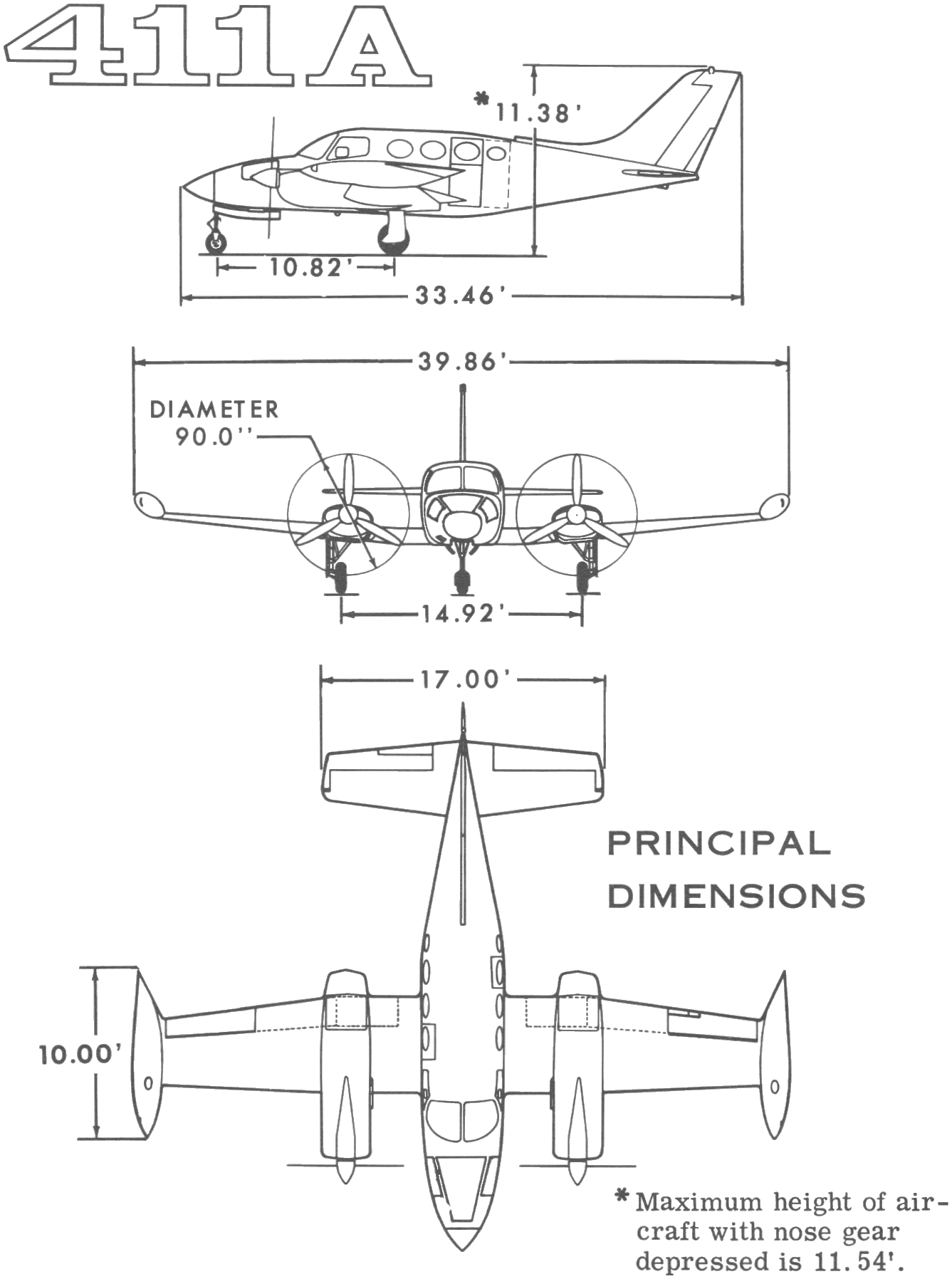
3-view line drawing of the Cessna 411A

Data from Jane's All The World's Aircraft 1965-66

General characteristics

- Crew: two
- Capacity: four to six passengers
- Length: 33 ft 5 1/2 in (10.20 m)
- Wingspan: 39 ft 10 1/4 in (12.15 m)
- Height: 11 ft 6 1/2 in (3.52 m)
- Wing area: 200 sq ft (19 m^{2})
- Empty weight: 3,820 lb (1,733 kg)
- Max takeoff weight: 6,500 lb (2,948 kg)
- Fuel capacity: 170 US gal (140 imp gal; 640 L) standard, 196 US gal (163 imp gal; 740 L) with auxiliary tanks
- Powerplant: 2 × Continental GTSIO-520 air-cooled geared, turbocharged flat-six engines, 340 hp (250 kW) each
- Propellers: 3-bladed constant-speed, 7 ft 4 in (2.24 m) diameter

Performance

- Maximum speed: 268 mph (431 km/h, 233 kn) at 16,000 ft (4,900 m)
- Cruise speed: 216 mph (348 km/h, 188 kn) at 25,000 ft (7,600 m) (econ cruise)
- Stall speed: 84 mph (135 km/h, 73 kn) (flaps down)
- Range: 1,300 mi (2,100 km, 1,100 nmi) at 216 mph (188 kn; 348 km/h) and 25,000 ft (7,600 m), normal fuel
- Service ceiling: 26,000 ft (7,900 m)
- Rate of climb: 1,600 ft/min (8.1 m/s)
- Takeoff distance to 50 ft (15m): 1,890 ft (580 m)
- Landing distance from 50 ft (15 m): 1,815 ft (553 m)

== See also ==
Related development

- Cessna 401/402
- Cessna 421
