= Caroline Gallup Reed =

American educator (1821–1914)

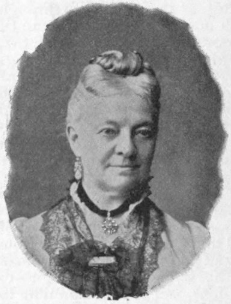
- Born: August 5, 1821; Berne, New York, US
- Died: November 17, 1914 (aged 93); New York, New York, US
- Burial place: All Saints' Memorial Church Cemetery
- Occupation: Educator
- Spouse: Sylvanus Reed (m. 1851)
- Children: 4, including Sylvanus Albert Reed
- Father: Albert Gallup

Caroline Gallup Reed (also known as Mrs. Sylvanus Reed; August 5, 1821 – November 17, 1914) was a United States educator.

== Biography ==
Caroline Gallup was born in Berne, New York the daughter of Albert Gallup, treasurer of Albany. She was educated at St. Peter's School and the female academy in Albany. In 1851 she married Sylvanus Reed, and in 1864 established a school for young women in New York City. In 1883, the school was incorporated under the laws of New York State as Reed College, so as to assure the perpetuity of the establishment.

Reed was elected a member of the American Geographical Society in 1860, the American Association for the Advancement of Science, and the New York Genealogical and Biographical Society in 1882.

She published various papers, and, before retiring, regularly issued "circulars of information" upon subjects of general educational interest. She closed the school upon her retirement in 1894.

Her son Sylvanus Albert Reed became an engineer, winning the 1925 Collier Trophy for the invention of the practical aircraft propeller.

She died at her home in New York City on November 17, 1914, and was buried at All Saints' Memorial Church Cemetery in Navesink, New Jersey.
