= Cahill Iron Works =

Cahill Iron Works was an American manufacturer of brass and iron architectural castings. It was established in 1875 by John Thomas (J.T.) Cahill in Chattanooga, Tennessee. Its product line included residential and commercial fixtures, including fences, railings, gates, sinks, faucets, gas heaters, fireplace grates, andirons, fireplace tools, frying pans, pots.

J.T. Cahill died on June 27, 1889. Frank H. Caldwell became president of Cahill Iron Works, with J.J. Mahoney holding the role of vice-president. This management team continued from 1889 through 1921. Crane and Company of Chicago acquired Cahill Iron Works in 1922, establishing the Crane Enameling subsidiary. The foundry building in Chattanooga acquired by Crane and Company is in the National Register of Historic Places (#83004246).
