= McCauley Propeller Systems =

American propeller manufacturer

- Industry: Aerospace
- Founded: 1938; 88 years ago
- Founder: Ernest G. McCauley
- Headquarters: Wichita, Kansas, United States
- Products: Aircraft propellers
- Parent: Cessna; Textron Aviation
- Website: mccauley.txtav.com

McCauley Propeller Systems is an American aircraft propeller manufacturer, founded in Dayton, Ohio in 1938 by Ernest G. McCauley. At its peak, it was reportedly the world's largest aircraft propeller manufacturer, or at least the largest manufacturer of general aviation propellers. For most of its existence, McCauley was headquartered in or near Dayton. In the 21st century, its headquarters were moved to then-parent-company Textron Aviation's headquarters in Wichita, Kansas.

Originally called the McCauley Aviation Corporation, it was promptly renamed the McCauley Steel Propeller Company when incorporated in 1939. Subsequently, it was renamed the McCauley Industrial Corporation, and, later the McCauley Industrial Division (or the McCauley Industrial Accessory Division) of Cessna Aircraft, who acquired McCauley in 1960. In 1992, Cessna was acquired by Textron Corporation, which subsequently absorbed Cessna into Textron Aviation. In September 1996, McCauley was renamed "McCauley Propeller Systems."

== History ==
The company began in 1928 in a small shop on Howell Street, in West Dayton, Ohio, with about 18 workers. During the 1930s and 1940s, McCauley produced wooden propellers.

The company is noted for having invented the ground-adjustable, solid-steel propeller in 1941. During World War II, McCauley manufactured 20,000 ground-adjustable solid-steel propellers. In 1946, the company invented the forged aluminum propeller. In 1947, McCauley developed the first all-metal propeller for light aircraft (such as single-engine Cessnas and Piper Cubs) — a fixed-pitch prop using the trade name "MET-L-PROP."

By 1967, in addition to propellers, the company was also producing propeller spinners and propeller governors. It was operating in a 160,000 sq ft (15,000 m^{2}) Dayton factory, employing 230 workers, with an annual sales volume of about US$5 million.

Between 1976 and 1978, Cessna planned replacing the 105,000 sq ft (9,800 m^{2}) McCauley factory with one twice the size. Initial hopes were to move the factory from West Dayton (citing thefts and staff harassment), to the Dayton International Airport — or, alternatively, to the Wichita, Kansas area (Cessna's home and prior hometown of McCauley chief Dussault). Dayton city leaders, trying to retain this key employer, struggled to overcome two Kansas advantages: its anti-union "right-to-work laws", and its legal options for local governments to grant tax breaks to employers. However, McCauley ultimately settled into a new site at Dayton International Airport.

By 1982, in addition to propellers, spinners and governors, the company was also producing wheels, brakes, and other accessories for aircraft.

In 1986, owing to product-liability lawsuits, Cessna, McCauley's parent company and principal customer, stopped producing propeller-driven aircraft (except for the Cessna Caravan) and McCauley's sales fell.

In February, 1992, McCauley parent company, Cessna Aircraft, was sold by its parent company, General Dynamics, to Textron, Inc.

In August, 1993, Textron, Cessna's new parent company, announced plans to sell the McCauley Accessory division. However, ultimately, the company remained within the Cessna/Textron family.

In 1996, after Congress passed, and President Clinton signed, the General Aviation Revitalization Act, which limited aircraft manufacturers' product liability, Cessna resumed production of propeller-driven aircraft, using McCauley propellers, boosting McCauley sales.

In December 1999, Cessna halted production of the Cessna 172 when defects in McCauley propellers were discovered during production. Though McCauley production continued, Cessna replaced McCauley's general manager and quality manager the next month.

== Key personnel ==
Founder Ernest G. McCauley, "a foremost pioneer in the aircraft propeller industry," according to the National Air and Space Museum, held numerous patents on controllable propellers, and was rewarded for the outstanding service which he provided to the United States government from 1918 to 1950. However, by the mid-1940s, a large board of directors, recruited by McCauley, voted him out of power. McCauley died in 1969.

In 1954, shop superintendent Vernon W. Deinzer was promoted to vice president for manufacturing, and three years later became vice president and general manager. When Cessna acquired McCauley in 1960, Deinzer remained as general manager of Cessna's "McCauley Industrial division."

In March, 1967, Cessna re-assigned Deinzer, to vice president and general manager of Cessna's Aircraft Radio division at Boonton, New Jersey, replacing him at McCauley with engineer and executive trainee John C. Dussault, (previously the technical services manager for commercial aircraft engineering at Cessna's Wichita, Kansas headquarters).

In December, 1982, during the early 1980s recession, Dussault was among seven top McCauley division officials who accepted an early retirement offer from Cessna. He was replaced by McCauley chief engineer Walter Voisard, a mechanical engineer and licensed pilot, who, prior to Cessna's 1960 acquisition of McCauley, had been vice president and chief engineer of McCauley Industrial Corp. for nine years.

In January 2000, McCauley vice president and general manager, James W. Simiister, was replaced, along with McCauley's quality manager, when defects were discovered in McCauley propellers received at the Cessna aircraft factory. Cessna's director of operations administration, Keith Kerschen, took control of McCauley, pending a permanent replacement.

== See also ==
- List of aircraft propeller manufacturers
