= William Barclay Parsons =

American civil engineer (1859–1932)

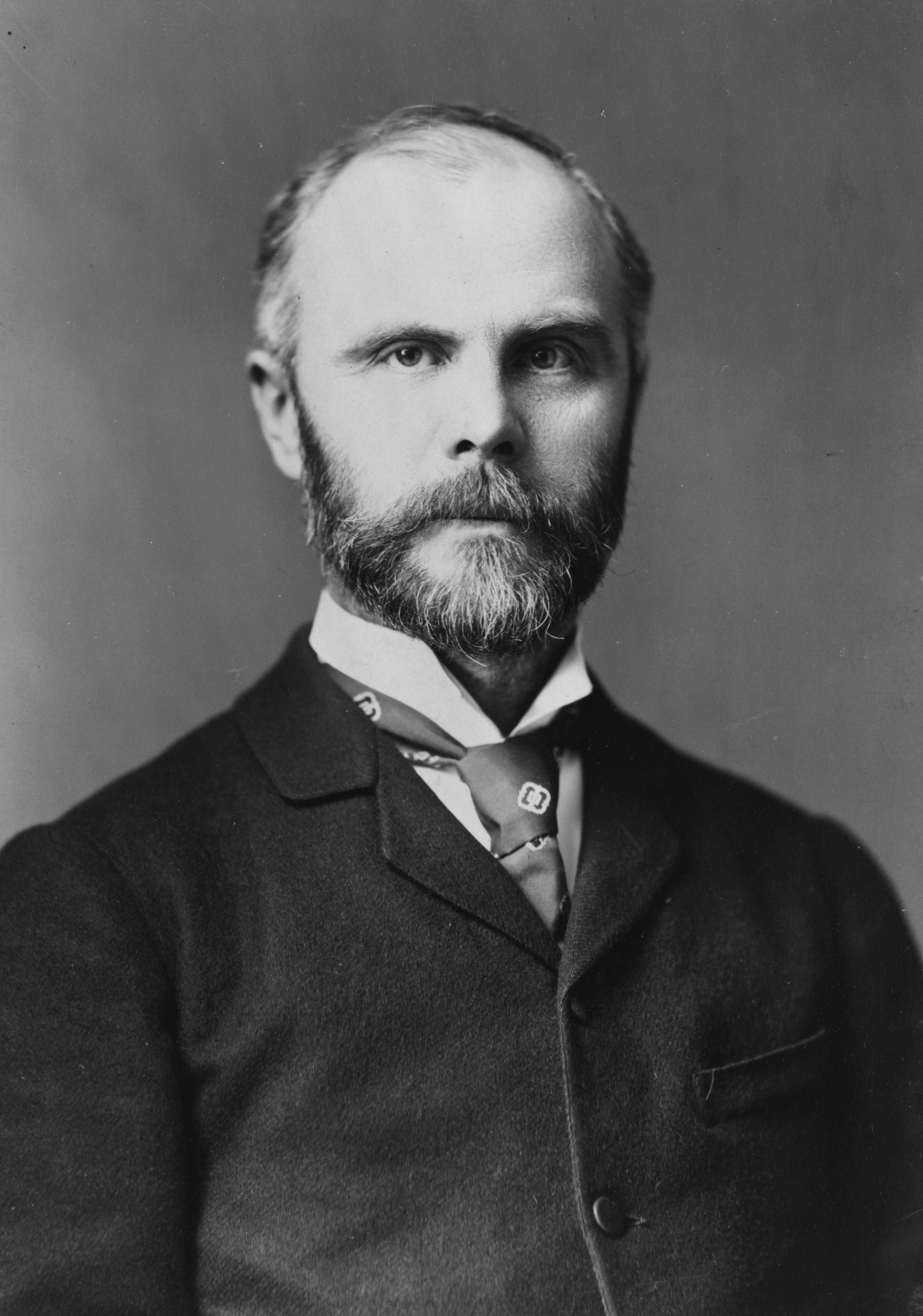
- Born: April 15, 1859; New York City, New York, US
- Died: May 9, 1932 (aged 73); New York City, New York, U.S.
- Education: Columbia University
- Spouse: Anna Dewitt Reed (m. 1884)
- Children: 2
- Engineering career
- Discipline: Civil engineer
- Practice name: Parsons Brinckerhoff
- Projects: First subway in New York City, Cape Cod Canal
- Awards: Norman Medal, Telford Medal
- Military career
- Branch: United States Army
- Rank: Colonel
- Unit: 11th Engineer Regiment
- Conflicts: World War I
- Awards: Distinguished Service Medal

William Barclay Parsons Jr. (April 15, 1859 – May 9, 1932) was an American civil engineer. He founded Parsons Brinckerhoff, one of the largest American civil engineering firms.

== Early life ==
Parsons was born on April 15, 1859 in New York City, New York, He was the son of William Barclay Parsons (1828–1887) and Eliza Glass Livingston Parsons (1831–1922). His siblings included Schuyler (1852–1917), Harry (1862–1935), and George (1863–1939).

In 1871, he went to school in Torquay, England, and studied under private tutors for four years while traveling in France, Germany, and Italy. He received a bachelor's degree from Columbia College of Columbia University in 1879, and a second from the Columbia School of Mines in 1882. He served as class president and president of the Philolexian Society, and he co-founded the Columbia Daily Spectator in 1877. He later served as chairman of the university's board of trustees.

== Career ==
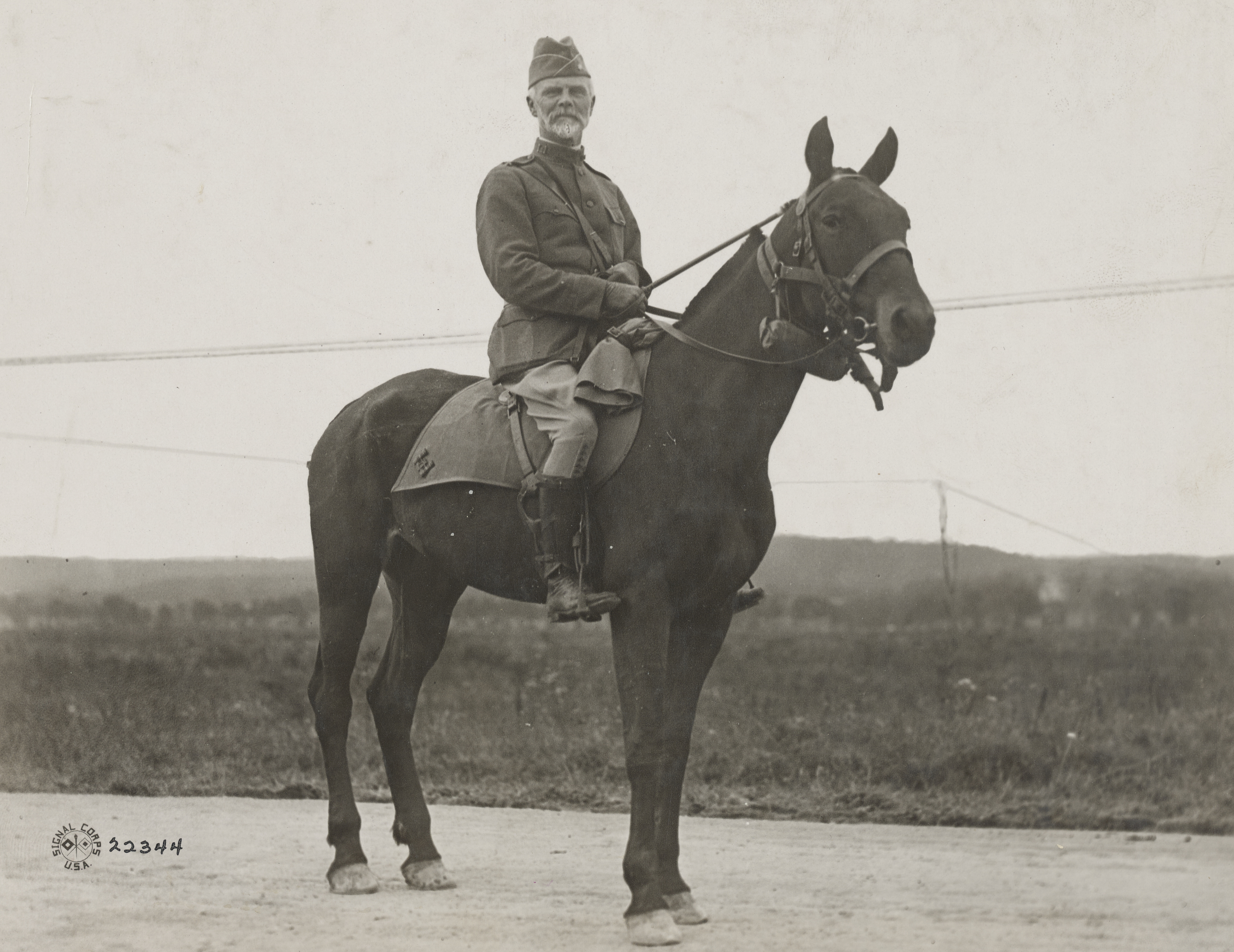
Lieutenant Colonel Parsons in France, October 1918.

Parsons worked for the New York, Lake Erie and Western Railroad from 1882 through 1885. He wrote Turnouts; Exact Formulae for Their Determination (1884) and Track, A Complete Manual of Maintenance of Way (1886) which both addressed railroad problems, and this interest in rail transportation continued throughout his life.

Parsons designed the Cape Cod Canal as Chief Engineer. He was also Chief Engineer of the Board of Rapid Transit Railroad Commissioners and was responsible for the construction of the Interborough Rapid Transit (IRT) subway line. He left New York in October 1886 to serve as Chief Engineer for the Fort Worth and Rio Grande Railroad, although he retained his affiliation with the District Railway Company. In 1887, he became the Chief Engineer and General Manager of the Denver Railroad and Land and Coal Company. He returned to New York in 1891 upon the completion of these railway projects and a number of water-work ventures in Mississippi.

Parsons was appointed to the Isthmian Canal Commission in 1904 by President Theodore Roosevelt. He was also appointed to the advisory board which provided technical advice to the Royal Commission on London Traffic in 1904, along with Sir Benjamin Baker and Sir John Wolfe-Barry, both British civil engineers. In early 1905, he traveled to Panama as a member of the committee of engineers which favored a sea-level canal.

Parsons was the Colonel of the 11th Engineers of the American Expeditionary Forces (AEF) in France during World War I. He was with a team of engineers in Battle of Cambrai that was suddenly attacked by Germans while making railroad repairs; the engineers fought back with picks and shovels. He was awarded the Army Distinguished Service Medal for "specially meritorious services" and received decorations from Great Britain, France, Belgium, and the state of New York. The citation for his Army DSM reads:

The President of the United States of America, authorized by Act of Congress, July 9, 1918, takes pleasure in presenting the Army Distinguished Service Medal to Colonel (Corps of Engineers) William Barclay Parsons, United States Army, for exceptionally meritorious and distinguished services to the Government of the United States, in a duty of great responsibility during World War I, as Major, 11th Engineers (Railway), during its organization and training period, Chairman of Engineering Railway Commission sent overseas to investigate and report upon railway conditions in France; Lieutenant Colonel and then Colonel, 11th Engineers, during its combat operations. By his wide experience, sound judgment, and brilliant professional and technical attainments, Colonel Parsons handled many difficult problems which confronted him with conspicuous success, thereby rendering services of great value to the American Expeditionary Forces.

== Personal life ==
Parsons married Anna Dewitt Reed (1858–1958) on May 20, 1884. She was the daughter of Rev. Sylvanus Reed and Caroline Gallup Reed. Their children were Sylvia (1885–1962) and William (1888–1973).

Parsons died on May 9, 1932, in New York City.

== Publications ==
- An American Engineer in China (1900)
- "The American Engineers in France. 1920.
- Engineers and Engineering of the Renaissance (1939)
- Robert Fulton and the Submarine. 1922.
- Track, a complete manual of maintenance of way. 1886.
- Turnouts: exact formulae for their determination, together with practical and accurate tables for use in the field. (1884). ISBN 978-1-141-46307-7.
