= Wallace Rupert Turnbull =

Canadian engineer and inventor

Wallace Rupert Turnbull (October 16, 1870 – November 24, 1954) was a Canadian engineer and inventor. The Saint John Airport was briefly named after him. He was inducted in Canada's Aviation Hall of Fame in 1977.

== Biography ==
Born in Saint John, New Brunswick, W. Rupert Turnbull graduated in mechanical engineering from Cornell University in 1893 and undertook postgraduate work in physics at the Universities of Berlin and Heidelberg, Germany. In 1902 he built the first wind tunnel in Canada. During the next decade, he continued researching the stability of aircraft and investigated many forms of airfoils. During World War I Turnbull was employed by Frederick and Company aircraft builders in England, where he designed a number of propellers, the most successful being his invention of the variable-pitch propeller which was first tested in 1927. His interests extended into many fields, such as hydroplane torpedo screen bomb sights, and tidal power, but his systematic approach to aeronautical engineering remains his greatest contribution.

== See also ==
- Frank W. Caldwell
