= All Saints' Memorial Church (Navesink, New Jersey) =

Historic church in New Jersey, United States

- All Saints' Memorial Church in the Highlands of Navesink
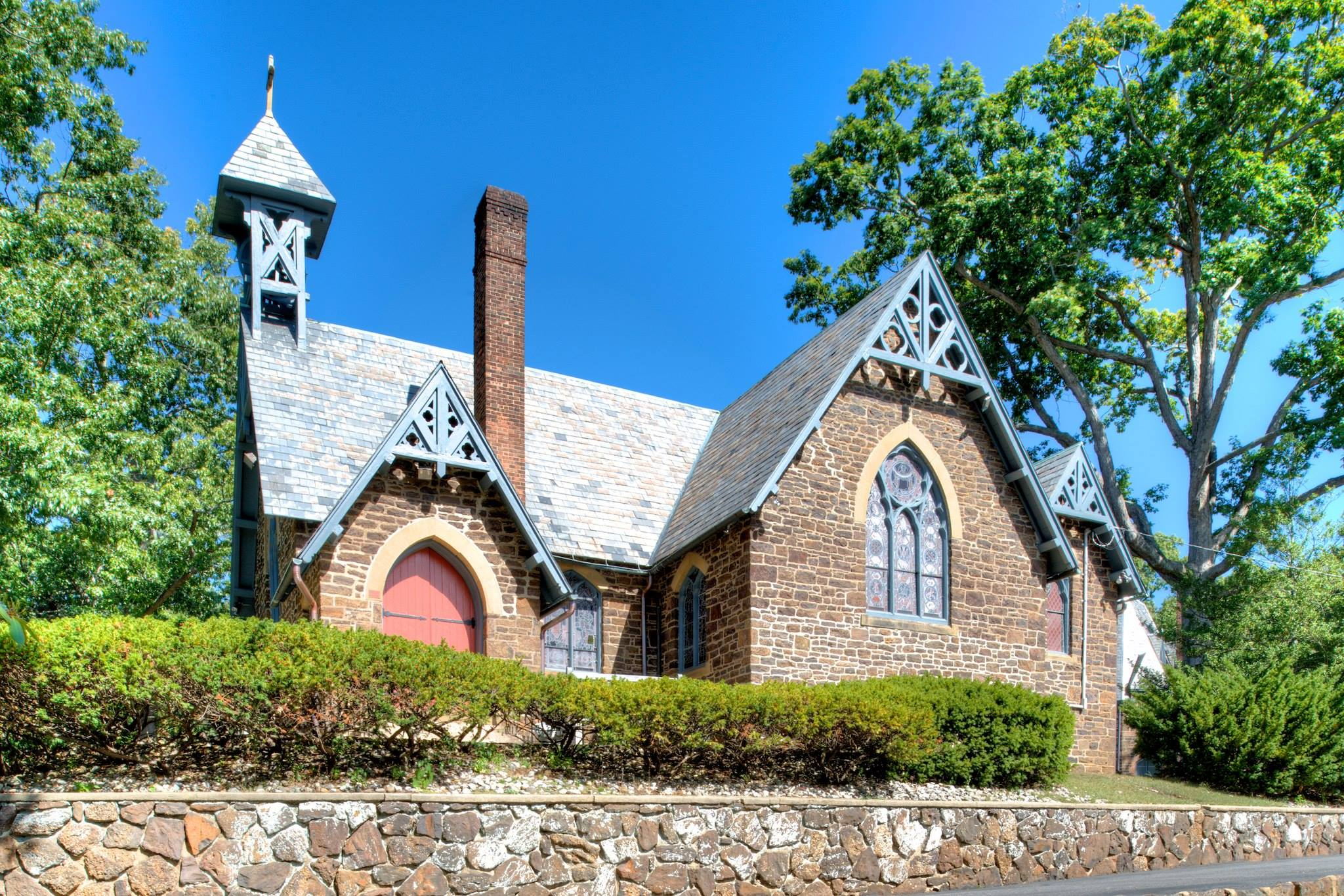

- Location within Monmouth County, New Jersey
- 40°23′54″N 74°01′14″W
- Location: Navesink, New Jersey
- Country: United States
- Denomination: Episcopal
- Website: www.allsaintsnavesink.org

History
- Status: Parish
- Founded: 16 July 1864
- Founder: John Henry Stevens

Architecture
- Functional status: Active
- Architect: Richard Upjohn
- Architectural type: Mission parish
- Style: Gothic Revival
- Groundbreaking: October 7, 1863
- Completed: July 16, 1864
- Construction cost: approx. $3,000

Specifications
- Materials: Uncoarsed fieldstone exterior, stained glass windows

Administration
- Province: Province II
- Diocese: Episcopal Diocese of New Jersey

Clergy
- Rector: Reverend Debbie Cook
- yes
- All Saints' Memorial Church Complex
- U.S. National Register of Historic Places
- U.S. National Historic Landmark
- New Jersey Register of Historic Places
- Built: July 16, 1864
- Architect: Richard Upjohn
- Architectural style: Gothic Revival
- NRHP reference No.: 74001179
- NJRHP No.: 2018

Significant dates
- Added to NRHP: February 15, 1974
- Designated NHL: December 23, 1987
- Designated NJRHP: November 20, 1973

All Saints' Memorial Church is a small stone Gothic-style Episcopal church built in 1864 by Richard Upjohn in Navesink, New Jersey. The church complex, which includes the rectory, stable, and carriage house, is a well-preserved example of the late work of Upjohn. It was added to the National Register of Historic Places on February 15, 1974, for its significance in architecture and designated a National Historic Landmark in 1987.

The church reported 211 members in 2015 and 238 members in 2023. Plate and pledge income reported for the congregation in 2024 was $191,521. Average Sunday attendance (ASA) in 2023 was 43 persons, down from a reported 67 in 2016.

== History ==
The church was one of the early small parishes begun by English families that settled in Riceville (now Navesink), New Jersey. Services were begun by the family of John Henry Stevens, from the Isle of Wight. One of Stevens' daughters married Charles E. Milnor, a Philadelphia Quaker who was "read out of meeting" for marrying an Episcopalian. He, John Henry Stevens, and other members of their family and friends were the leaders in the formation of a congregation and the foundation of the parish of "All Saints' Memorial Church in the Highlands of Navesink." The certificate of incorporation, dated July 16, 1864, is signed by Charles E. Milnor, Warden and E. M. Hartshorne, Secretary of the Vestry.

As the congregation grew, Milnor began a school program which flourished, with 70 children enrolled shortly after opening. Mrs. James A. Edgar, a devout member, wished to establish a church, but because of her untimely death, it was left to her father and husband to endow the church in her memory. Thus on October 7, 1863, the corner stone was laid by the Bishop of New Jersey, the Right Reverend William Henry Odenheimer. Odenheimer, along with Bishop George Washington Doane of Burlington and Bishop J. M. Wainwright of Trinity Church in New York City were the three most powerful Episcopalians in the United States at mid-century and all three commissioned Upjohn churches.

The original 1864 buildings were the church and schoolhouse. All Saints grew and added three buildings to the complex: the parish house in 1865, the rectory in 1869, and the carriage sheds at the turn of the century.

== Design ==
The church itself somewhat resembles St. James-the-Less in Philadelphia, which deeply impressed Upjohn. It is believed that he saw it while working in Burlington for Bishop Doane. The influence of St. James is seen in a number of these small parish churches like All Saints'--the simplicity, dignity, and simple stone masses without much ornament are typical of Upjohn's preference for what he called "truth" in Gothic Revival architecture, and with these small churches he had established the concept of taste and competence. It is then entirely fitting that he should have been one of the founders and the first President of the American Institute of Architects.

Gothic Revival architecture was well expressed in churches, and most notably in English parish churches. As Professor of art history William Pierson wrote on the American manifestation of parishes,

"Quite apart from stylistic considerations, a small asymmetrical parish church of stone related far more sympathetically to the countryside of rural America than did the stern, gleaming white boxes of the Greek Revival. Moreover, the New York Ecclesiological Society aggressively maintained independence from its English counterpart, and in the articles which appeared in the New York Ecclesiologist, the American avoided as far as possible the complicated byways of high Ecclesiology, dealing instead with such matters as the honest use of materials, economy, and the need to maintain actual designs within the limits of local capability. They also stressed simplicity, pointing out that it was not necessary to make a church elaborate in order to have it fulfill its doctrinal purpose."

This period of architectural history had a vitality and cohesiveness that would not be seen again until Henry Hobson Richardson's work at the end of the 19th century.

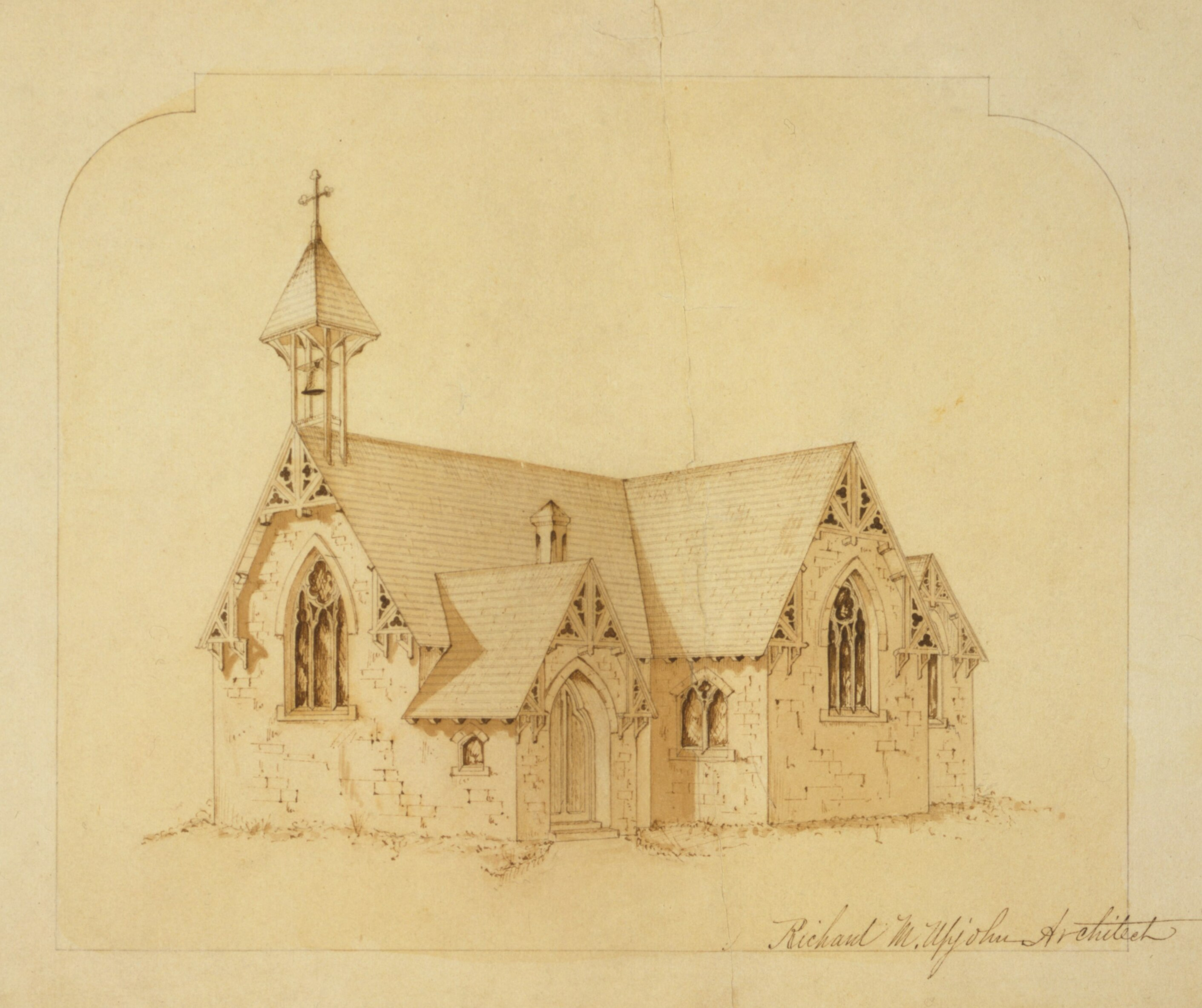
Sketch of church by Upjohn's son, Richard M. Upjohn

== See also ==
- National Register of Historic Places listings in Monmouth County, New Jersey
