= Hamilton Standard =

American aircraft propeller manufacturer

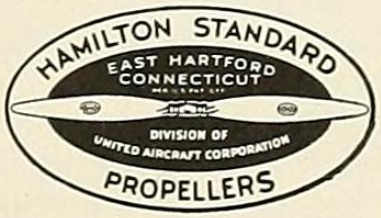
- Type: Subsidiary
- Industry: Aerospace
- Predecessor: Hamilton Aero Manufacturing and Standard Steel Propeller
- Founded: 1929; 97 years ago
- Defunct: 1999
- Fate: Merged
- Successor: Hamilton Sundstrand
- Headquarters: Windsor Locks, Connecticut, United States
- Key people: Frank W. Caldwell

Hamilton Standard was an American aircraft propeller parts supplier. It was formed in 1929 when United Aircraft and Transport Corporation consolidated Hamilton Aero Manufacturing and Standard Steel Propeller into the Hamilton Standard Propeller Corporation. Other members of United Aircraft included Boeing, United Airlines, Sikorsky and Pratt & Whitney. At the time, Hamilton was the largest manufacturer of aircraft propellers in the world.

== History ==
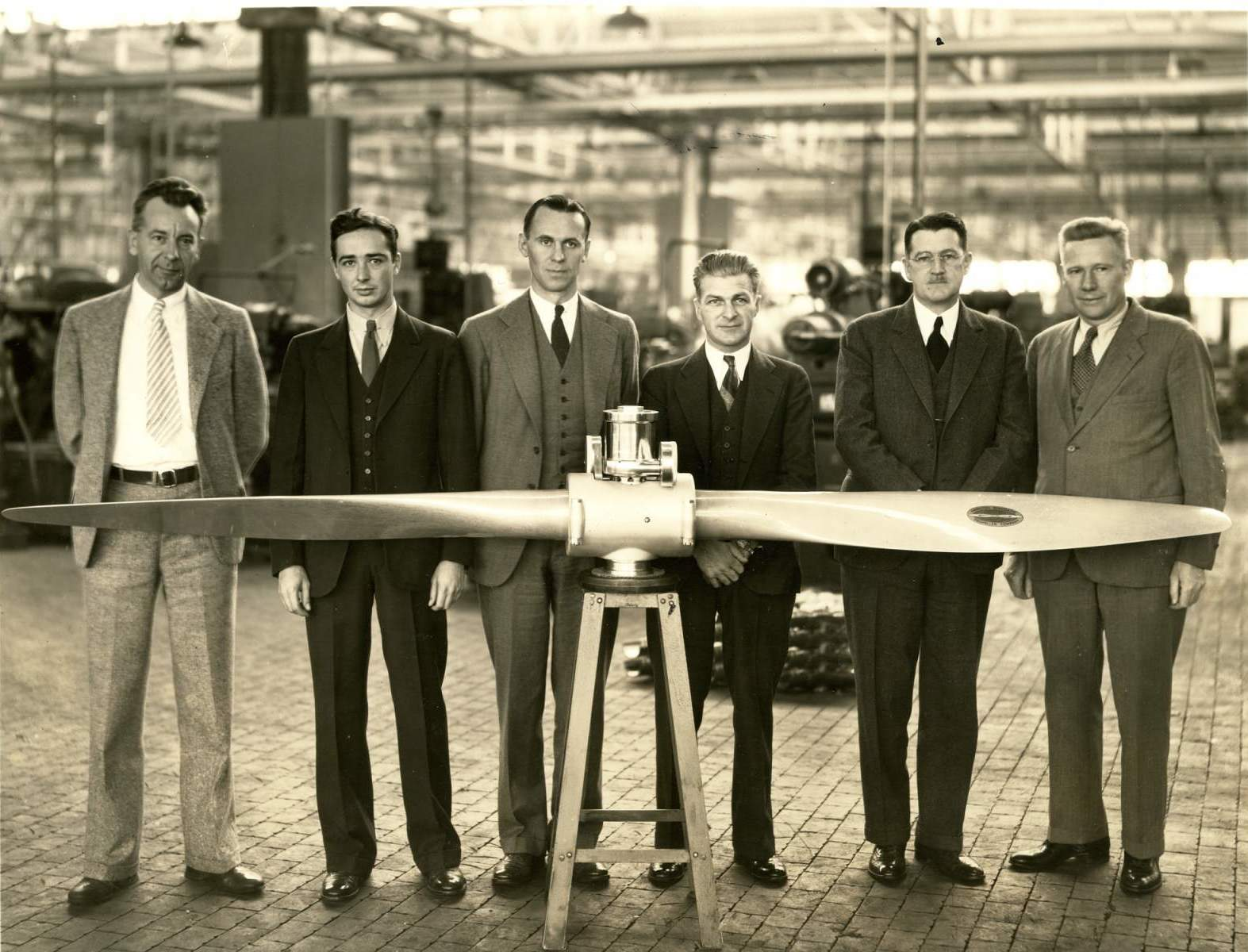
The 1,000th controllable pitch propeller produced by Hamilton Standard with the 1933 Collier Trophy-winning team that designed it

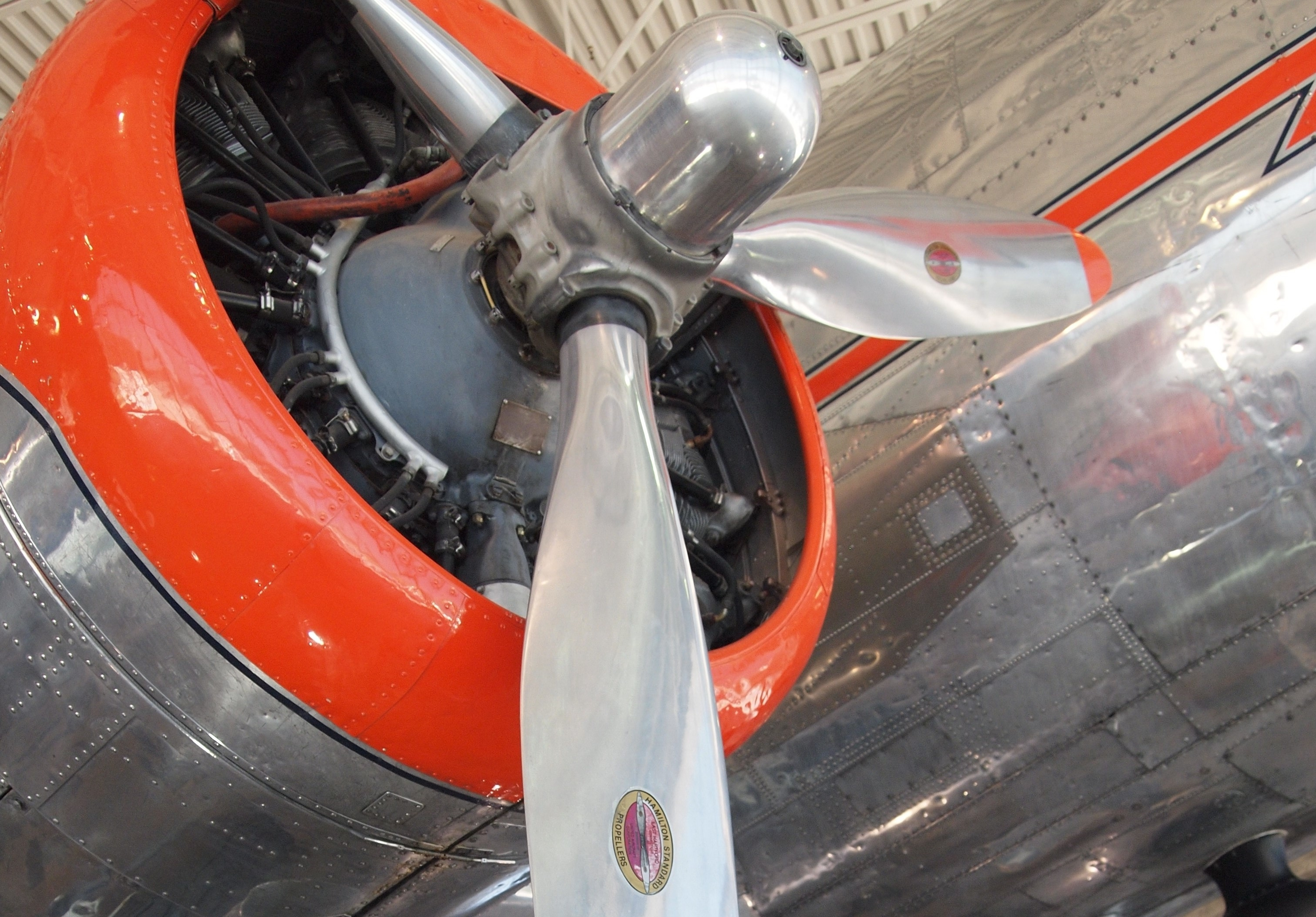
Hamilton Standard propeller on Douglas DC-3 of American Airlines

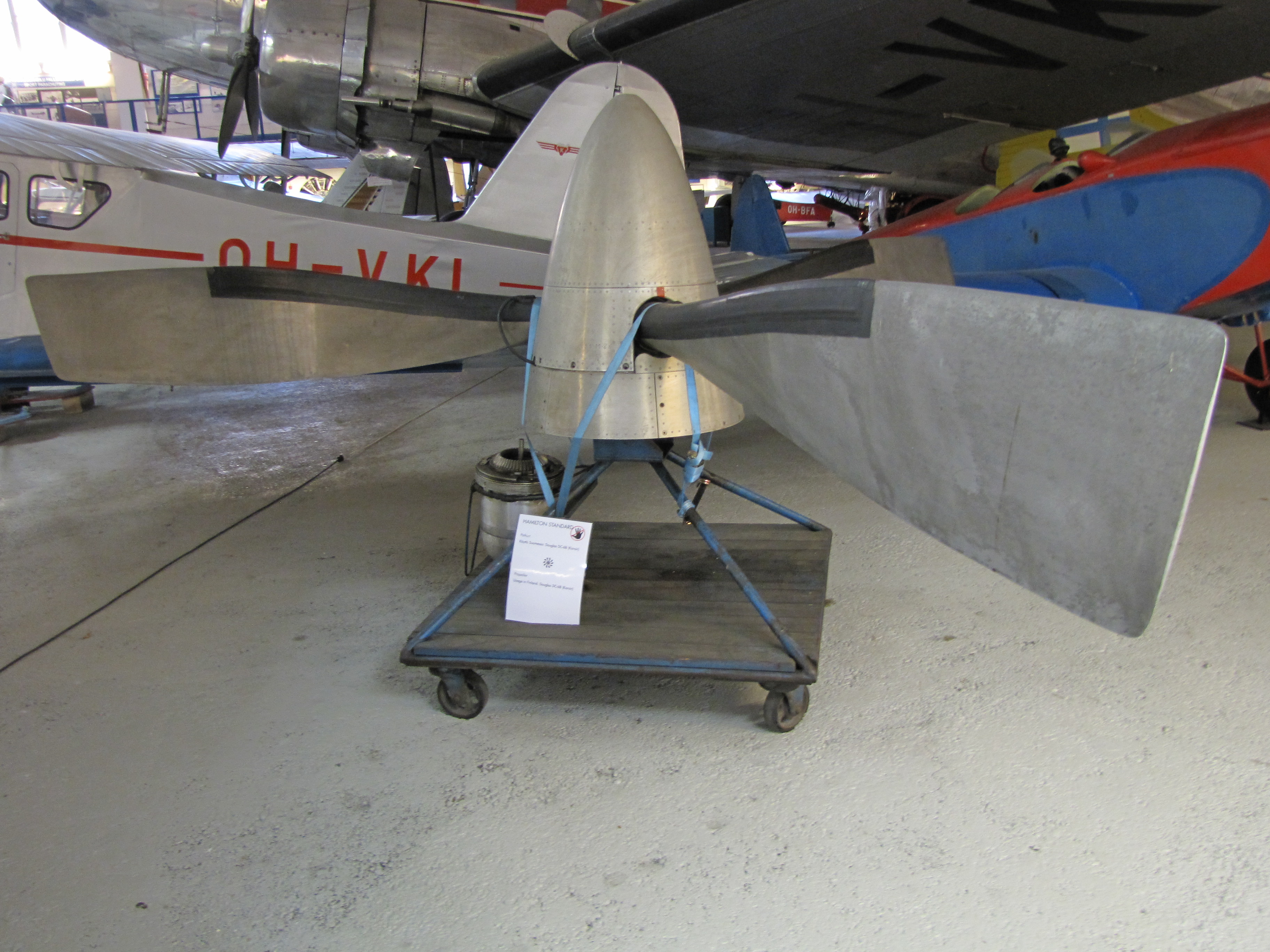
Hamilton Standard three-bladed propeller used on a Douglas DC-6

Standard Steel Propeller had been formed in 1918 in Pittsburgh, Pennsylvania, and Hamilton Aero Manufacturing had been formed in 1920 in Milwaukee, Wisconsin, by Thomas F. Hamilton. Charles Lindbergh's Spirit of St. Louis used a propeller made by Standard Steel Propeller Company in his historic solo crossing of the Atlantic Ocean. The two companies were merged in 1929 by the United Aircraft and Transport Corporation.

In the early 1930s, Frank W. Caldwell of Hamilton Standard led a team that developed a variable-pitch propeller, using hydraulic pressure and centrifugal force to change the angle of attack of the blades. Caldwell received the 1933 Collier Trophy for this advance in flight propulsion. Later advances included full-feathering and reversible propellers.

Hamilton Standard was a division of United Aircraft Corporation (1934) along with Pratt & Whitney, which manufactured aircraft engines.

In the early 1950s Hamilton developed the technology to accurately meter fuel in jet engines and its fuel controls were employed on Boeing 707s and Douglas DC-8s, as well as most other Pratt & Whitney jet engines. In 1952, Hamilton Standard opened its plant in Windsor Locks, Connecticut. In 1958, Hamilton's first environmental control system entered service on the Convair 880. In 1968, Hamilton began delivering automatic, electronic systems for control of cabin pressure in aircraft. Hamilton's mechanical fuel controls, in use since the 1950s, evolved into electronically controlled fuel controls, and eventually, to full-authority digital electronic controls (FADEC) for jet engines, which are in use today on many commuter, airline, and military engine applications. Hamilton's environmental systems and early association with NASA were highlighted in the 1969 Apollo 11 Moon landing, supported by environmental control, fuel cell, and life support systems manufactured by Hamilton Standard.

General Motors' propeller business, which originated with its purchase of Aeroproducts in 1940, was acquired by Hamilton Standard in 1990.

== Mergers ==
In 1999, the United Technologies Corporation acquired Sundstrand Corporation for $4.3 billion and merged it with Hamilton to form Hamilton Sundstrand. Sundstrand brought a long history and portfolio of aerospace products to the newly named company. Hamilton Sundstrand continues to provide aerospace components and systems to most of the world's aircraft manufacturers, including Boeing, Airbus, Bombardier, and Embraer.

In 2012, Hamilton Sundstrand merged with Goodrich Corporation in a $3.5 billion sale and became UTC Aerospace Systems. In 2018, UTC merged UTC Aerospace Systems with Rockwell Collins to form Collins Aerospace.

== Accidents ==
On August 21, 1995, Atlantic Southeast Airlines Flight 529, an Embraer EMB 120 Brasilia flying from Atlanta, Georgia, to Gulfport, Mississippi, crashed in the community of Burwell between the cities of Bowdon, Georgia, and Carrollton, Georgia. Nine of the 29 passengers and crew on board were killed as a result of the accident. The accident bore similarities to Atlantic Southeast Airlines Flight 2311, which had occurred four years earlier, and resulted in the deaths of all 23 people on board. The inquiries of both crashes concluded that design flaws in the aircraft's propellers were to blame.

The probable cause of the ASA 529 accident was determined to be the failure of the propeller due to undiscovered metal fatigue in one blade resulting from corrosion from chlorine. Two previous failures of the same type of propeller had occurred, but those aircraft had been able to land safely. The failed propeller blade had undergone scheduled ultrasonic testing on May 19, 1994, which resulted in its rejection and removal from the propeller. The blade was sent to a Hamilton Standard facility, where it was subject to refurbishing work that was incorrectly performed. The propeller blade was then installed on the propeller fitted to the aircraft on September 30, 1994.

The National Transportation Safety Board (NTSB) criticized Hamilton Standard, which had maintained the propellers, for "inadequate and ineffective corporate inspection and repair techniques, training, documentation, and communication", and both Hamilton Standard and the Federal Aviation Administration for "failure to require recurrent on-wing ultrasonic inspections for the affected propellers". The overcast skies and low cloud ceiling at the crash site also contributed to the severity of the crash.

The ASA 529 crash was the last incident caused by problems with Hamilton Standard propellers.

== See also ==
- List of aircraft propeller manufacturers
- Atlantic Southeast Airlines Flight 529
- Atlantic Southeast Airlines Flight 2311
