= Propeller synchronization =

In aviation, propeller synchronization is a mechanism that automatically synchronizes all propellers of a multi-engine, propeller-driven aircraft so that they rotate at the same speed.

Propeller synchronization serves mainly to increase the comfort of crew and passengers, since its primary purpose is to reduce the “beats” generated by propellers that are turning at slightly different speeds. These beats can become very irritating to persons inside the aircraft after a time. Synchronization is not normally necessary for proper operation of the aircraft.

Some aircraft provide a visual indicator of propeller synchronization in the cockpit. Pilots can use this indicator to decide whether or not to engage propeller synchronization, or to help them synchronize propeller speeds manually.

== Usage ==
Operation of propeller synchronization can occur with a primary/secondary approach or with a push/pull technique associated with Type II systems. In Type II systems speed is increased for the side lower in RPM while at the same time speed is decreased on the faster RPM side. The net result is similar, but there is no primary or secondary, and no minute hunting typical of a Type I (primary/secondary) system. With a Type II system RPM cannot be reduced below manual speed settings so prop sync does not need to be off during takeoff and landing. Type I systems must be off for takeoff and landings.
