= McCarthy Airport =

Airport in Alaska, U.S.

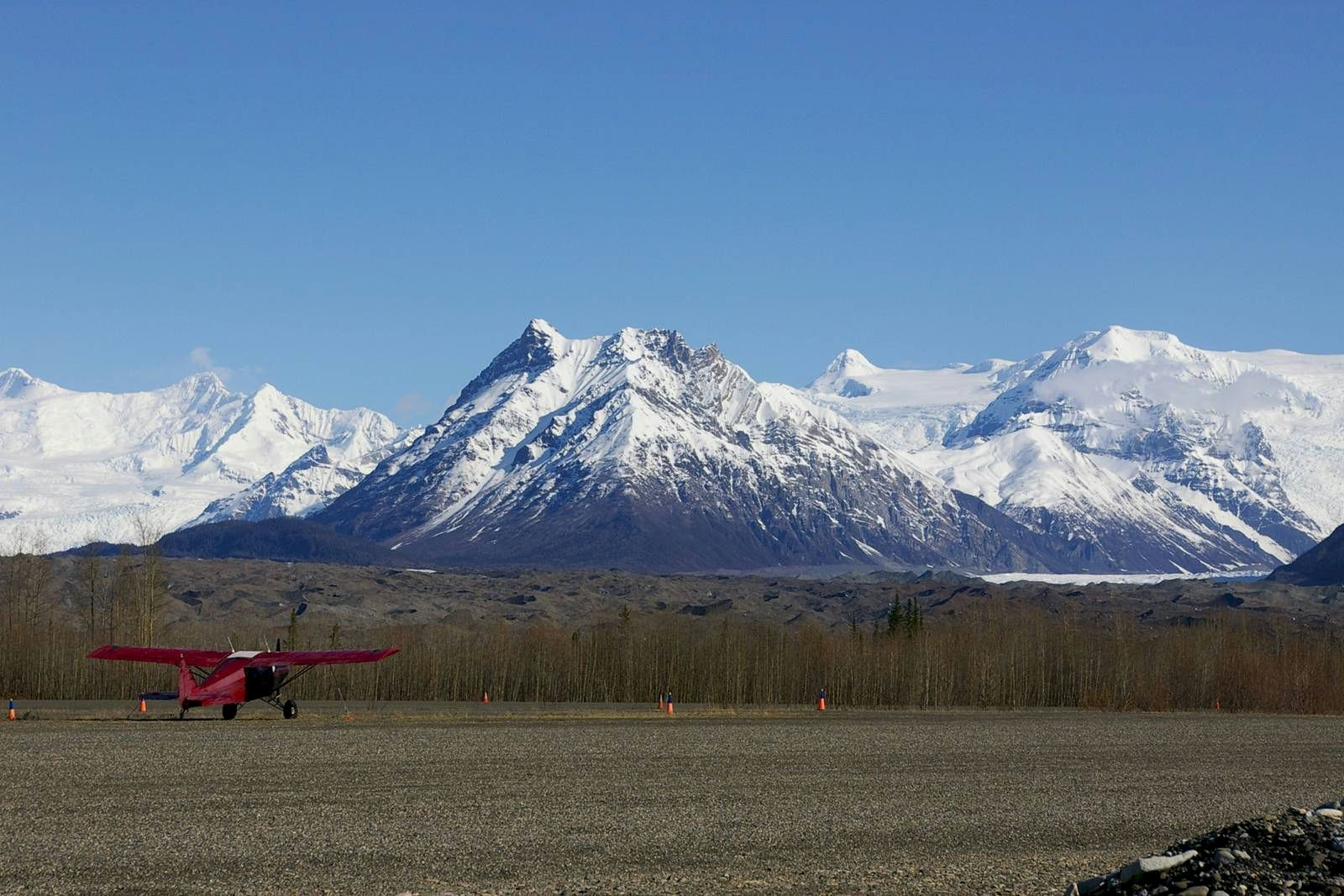
- IATA: MXY; ICAO: PAMX; FAA LID: 15Z

Summary
- Airport type: Public
- Owner: State of Alaska DOT&PF - Northern Region
- Serves: McCarthy, Alaska
- Elevation AMSL: 1,531 ft / 467 m
- Coordinates: 61°26′13″N 142°54′13″W

Map
- Location of airport in Alaska

Runways
| Direction | Length | | Surface |
| Direction | ft | m | Surface |
|---|---|---|---|
| 1/19 | 3,500 | 1,067 | Gravel |

Statistics (2010)
- Aircraft operations: 1,400
- Source: Federal Aviation Administration

McCarthy Airport (IATA: MXY, ICAO: PAMX, FAA LID: 15Z) is a state owned, public use airport located one nautical mile (2 km) northeast of the central business district of McCarthy, in the Copper River Census Area of the U.S. state of Alaska. Scheduled passenger service is subsidized by the Essential Air Service program.

As per Federal Aviation Administration records, the airport had 48 passenger boardings (enplanements) in calendar year 2008, 65 enplanements in 2009, and 54 in 2010. It is included in the National Plan of Integrated Airport Systems for 2011–2015, which categorized it as a general aviation airport.

== Facilities and aircraft ==
McCarthy Airport has one runway designated 1/19 with a gravel surface measuring 3,500 by 60 feet (1,067 x 18 m). In winter it is maintained irregularly. For the 12-month period ending January 1, 2010, the airport had 1,400 aircraft operations, an average of 27 per week: 64% general aviation and 36% air taxi.

== Airlines and destinations ==
The following airlines offer scheduled passenger service at this airport:

| Airlines | Destinations |
|---|---|
| Copper Valley Air Service | Gulkana |
| Wrangell Mountain Air | Chitina |

== See also ==
- List of airports in Alaska

== Other sources ==
- Essential Air Service documents (Docket DOT-OST-1995-492) from the U.S. Department of Transportation:
  - Order 2003-3-16 (March 20, 2003): tentatively re-selecting Ellis Air Taxi, Inc., to provide essential air service at Gulkana, May Creek and, McCarthy, Alaska, for the two-year period from February 1, 2003, through January 31, 2005, at a combined annual subsidy of $231,101.
  - Order 2005-3-14 (March 8. 2005): tentatively re-selecting Ellis Air Taxi, Inc., to provide essential air service at Gulkana, May Creek and, McCarthy, Alaska, for the two-year period from February 1, 2005, through January 31, 2007, at a combined annual subsidy of $339,356.
  - Order 2006-11-23 (November 27, 2006): re-selecting Ellis Air Taxi, Inc., to provide essential air service (EAS) at Gulkana, May Creek, and McCarthy, Alaska, for the two-year period beginning February 1, 2007, at an annual subsidy rate of $392,174.
  - Order 2008-12-19 (December 29, 2008): selecting Ellis Air Taxi, Inc. d/b/a Copper Valley Air Service, to continue providing essential air service (EAS) at Gulkana, May Creek and McCarthy, Alaska, for a new two-year period, through January 31, 2011, and establishing a combined subsidy rate of $424,652 annually.
  - Order 2010-12-8 (December 6, 2010): re-selecting Ellis Air Taxi Inc. d/b/a Copper Valley Air Service, to provide subsidized essential air service (EAS) at Gulkana, May Creek, and McCarthy, Alaska, for the two-year period beginning February 1, 2011, at the annual subsidy rates of $262,220 for Gulkana, and $176,692 for both May Creek and McCarthy.
  - Order 2012-11-34 (November 30, 2012): re-selecting Copper Valley Air Service to provide subsidized Essential Air Service (EAS) at Gulkana, May Creek, and McCarthy, Alaska, for the two-year period beginning February 1, 2013, at the annual subsidy rates of $269,189 for Gulkana (six-seat twin engine Piper PA-31 aircraft and operate two nonstop round trips each week year-round to Anchorage), and $206,198 for both May Creek and McCarthy (two nonstop or one-stop round trips per week to Gulkana using three-seat Cessna 185 aircraft during winter months and four-seat Cessna 206 aircraft during summer months).
