= Harpal Randhawa =

Indian businessman

- Born: 1 August 1963; India
- Died: 29 September 2023 (aged 60); Zvamahande, Mashava, Zimbabwe
- Cause of death: Plane crash
- Education: The Lawrence School, Sanawar; University of London
- Occupation(s): Businessman, investor
- Known for: Founder of GEM Holdings; Owner of RioZim
- Spouse: Shon Randhawa
- Children: Amer Randhawa (deceased)
- Relatives: Iqrup Dhamija (sister)

Harpal Randhawa (August 1963 – 29 September 2023) was an Indian investor in the mining and metals sectors in Zimbabwe. He was best known as the owner of RioZim, a prominent mining conglomerate in Zimbabwe.

== Early life and education ==
Randhawa was born in August 1963 to a military family in India. His father served as a cavalry general in the Indian Army's 7th Light Cavalry. At age seven, he was sent to The Lawrence School in Sanawar, Himachal Pradesh, before moving to England in the 1970s.

He qualified as a chartered accountant through the Institute of Chartered Accountants in England and Wales and studied at the University of London, establishing the foundation for his business career.

== Business career ==
The centerpiece of Randhawa's businesses was RioZim, the Zimbabwean mining company he acquired in 2012 when he purchased a 24% controlling stake from Rio Tinto through GEM Holdings. Under Randhawa's leadership, the company was engaged in diamond mining, operated multiple gold mines including Renco, Cam & Motor, and Dalny, ran the Empress Nickel Refinery and maintained significant interests in coal production through Sengwa Colliery.

Randhawa's most ambitious expansion came through diamond mining investments. He acquired a 22% stake in Murowa Diamonds in 2015 and purchased Namibia's Sperrgebiet diamond mine in 2022.

== Personal life ==
Randhawa married Shon Randhawa, an entrepreneur who co-founded luxury fashion brands Patine and Talitha. Together they had one son, Amer Randhawa, born in 2001. Amer was a trained pilot and accomplished polo player who was being groomed to eventually take over the family business empire. The family split time between London and Zimbabwe.

Randhawa's sister, Iqrup Dhamija, founded Iqrup Design, a luxury interior design firm.

== Death ==
On 29 September 2023, at 6:00 AM, Randhawa and five others departed Harare aboard RioZim's Cessna 206 bound for the Murowa diamond mine in southwestern Zimbabwe. Between 7:30 and 8:00 AM, the single-engine aircraft experienced mechanical failure, possibly including a mid-air explosion, before crashing in the Zvamahande area near Mashava.

All six passengers, including Randhawa and his 22-year-old son Amer, died instantly upon impact.

This marked the second RioZim aircraft incident in eight months. A previous crash in February 2023 had injured five people during an emergency landing.
