= GKN (disambiguation) =

GKN is a British engineering firm.

GKN or gkn may also refer to:

- Gokana language (ISO 639-3 code)
- Gulkana Airport (IATA airport code), Alaska, US
- Reformed Churches in the Netherlands (Dutch: Gereformeerde Kerken in Nederland)
