= CXC (disambiguation) =

CXC refers to the Caribbean Examinations Council, an exam board in the Caribbean.

CXC can also refer to:

- 190 (number), in Roman numerals

- 190 (year), a year in the second century
- 190, several topics

- CXC chemokines, a type of signaling protein in biology
- Chitina Airport, an airport near Chitina, Alaska, U.S.
