= Gulkana Airport =

Airport in Alaska, United States

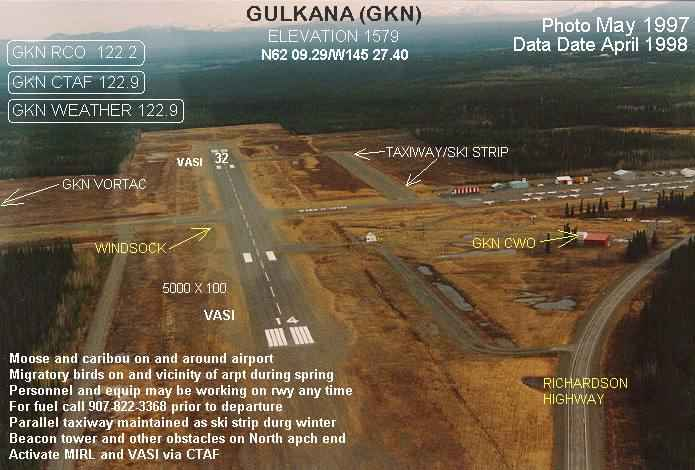
- IATA: GKN; ICAO: PAGK; FAA LID: GKN

Summary
- Airport type: Public
- Owner: State of Alaska DOT&PF
- Serves: Gulkana, Alaska
- Elevation AMSL: 1,586 ft (483 m)
- Coordinates: 62°09′18″N 145°27′16″W

Map
- Location of airport in Alaska

Runways
| Direction | Length | | Surface |
| Direction | ft | m | Surface |
|---|---|---|---|
| 15/33 | 5,001 | 1,524 | Asphalt |

Statistics (2006)
- Aircraft operations: 5,122
- Based aircraft: 13
- Source: Federal Aviation Administration

Gulkana Airport (IATA: GKN, ICAO: PAGK, FAA LID: GKN) is a state owned, public use airport located four nautical miles (5 mi, 7 km) northeast of the central business district of Gulkana, in the Copper River Census Area of the U.S. state of Alaska. It is also five miles (8 km) northeast of Glennallen. Scheduled passenger service is subsidized by the Essential Air Service program.

As per Federal Aviation Administration records, the airport had 204 passenger boardings (enplanements) in calendar year 2008, 187 enplanements in 2009, and 141 in 2010. It is included in the National Plan of Integrated Airport Systems for 2011–2015, which categorized it as a general aviation airport.

== Facilities and aircraft ==
Gulkana Airport covers an area of 1,678 acres (679 ha) at an elevation of 1,586 feet (483 m) above mean sea level. It has one runway designated 15/33 with an asphalt surface measuring 5,001 by 100 feet (1,524 x 30 m).

For the 12-month period ending December 31, 2006, the airport had 5,122 aircraft operations, an average of 14 per day: 67% general aviation, 19% scheduled commercial, 11% air taxi, and 3% military. At that time there were 13 aircraft based at this airport: 85% single-engine and 15% multi-engine.

== Airlines and destinations ==
The following airlines offer scheduled passenger service at this airport:

| Airlines | Destinations |
|---|---|
| Copper Valley Air Service | May Creek, McCarthy |
| Reeve Air Alaska | Anchorage |

== See also ==
- List of airports in Alaska

== Other sources ==
- Essential Air Service documents (Docket DOT-OST-1995-492) from the U.S. Department of Transportation:
  - Order 2003-3-16 (March 20, 2003): tentatively re-selecting Ellis Air Taxi, Inc., to provide essential air service at Gulkana, May Creek and, McCarthy, Alaska, for the two-year period from February 1, 2003, through January 31, 2005, at a combined annual subsidy of $231,101.
  - Order 2005-3-14 (March 8, 2005): tentatively re-selecting Ellis Air Taxi, Inc., to provide essential air service at Gulkana, May Creek and, McCarthy, Alaska, for the two-year period from February 1, 2005, through January 31, 2007, at a combined annual subsidy of $339,356.
  - Order 2006-11-23 (November 27, 2006): re-selecting Ellis Air Taxi, Inc., to provide essential air service (EAS) at Gulkana, May Creek, and McCarthy, Alaska, for the two-year period beginning February 1, 2007, at an annual subsidy rate of $392,174.
  - Order 2008-12-19 (December 29, 2008): selecting Ellis Air Taxi, Inc. d/b/a Copper Valley Air Service, to continue providing essential air service (EAS) at Gulkana, May Creek and McCarthy, Alaska, for a new two-year period, through January 31, 2011, and establishing a combined subsidy rate of $424,652 annually.
  - Order 2010-12-8 (December 6, 2010): re-selecting Ellis Air Taxi Inc. d/b/a Copper Valley Air Service, to provide subsidized essential air service (EAS) at Gulkana, May Creek, and McCarthy, Alaska, for the two-year period beginning February 1, 2011, at the annual subsidy rates of $262,220 for Gulkana, and $176,692 for both May Creek and McCarthy.
  - Order 2012-11-34 (November 30, 2012): re-selecting Copper Valley Air Service to provide subsidized Essential Air Service (EAS) at Gulkana, May Creek, and McCarthy, Alaska, for the two-year period beginning February 1, 2013, at the annual subsidy rates of $269,189 for Gulkana (six-seat twin engine Piper PA-31 aircraft and operate two nonstop round trips each week year-round to Anchorage), and $206,198 for both May Creek and McCarthy (two nonstop or one-stop round trips per week to Gulkana using three-seat Cessna 185 aircraft during winter months and four-seat Cessna 206 aircraft during summer months).
