= 2001 Peru Cessna 185 shootdown =

Civilian killing by Peruvian Air Force

2001 Peru shootdown
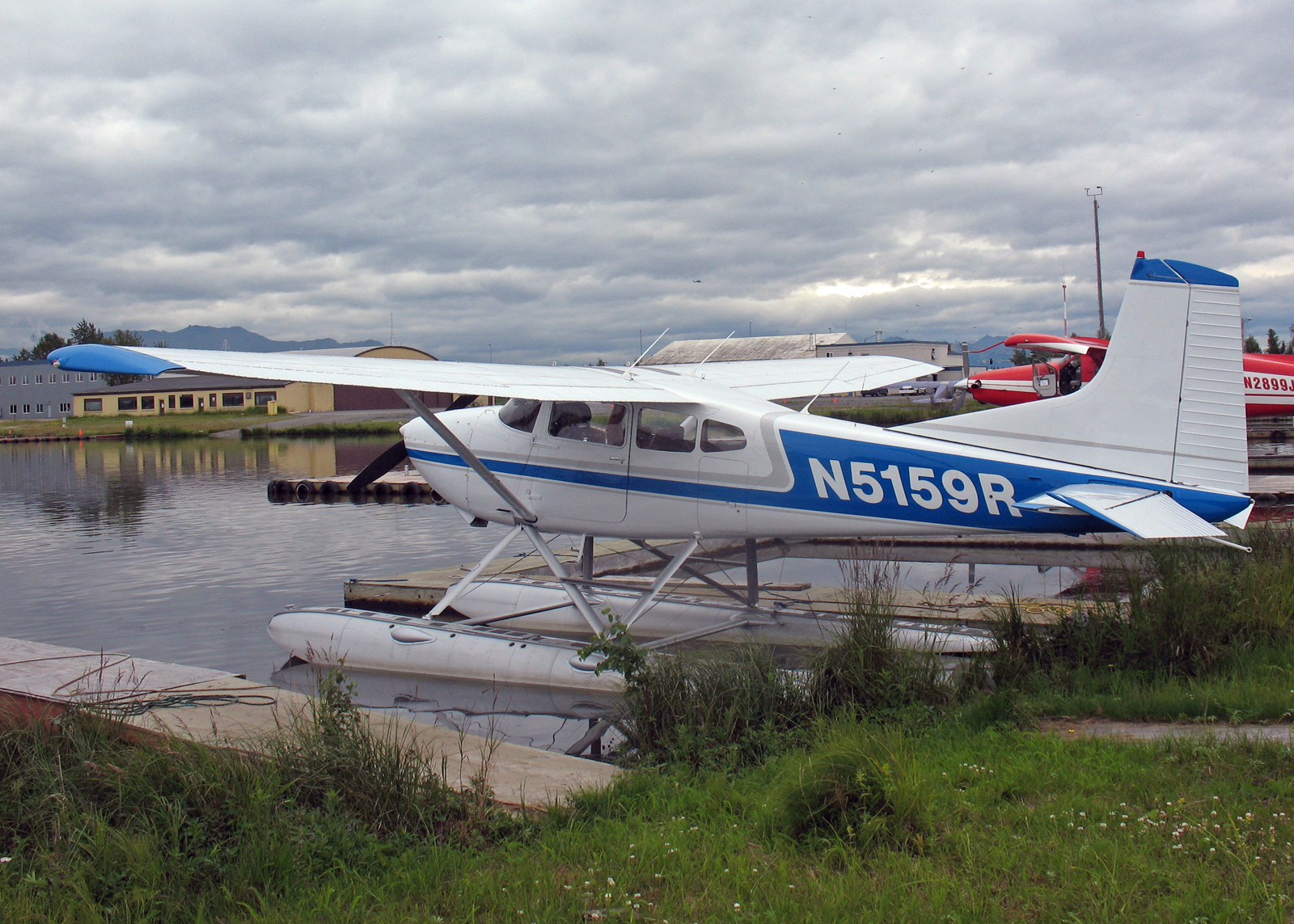
- A Cessna A185F, similar to the aircraft shot down

Shootdown
- Date: 20 April 2001
- Summary: Shot down by Cessna A-37 of the Peruvian Air Force
- Site: Pebas District, near the Peru-Brazil border, Peru

Aircraft
- Aircraft type: Cessna A185F
- Operator: General aviation
- Registration: OB-1408
- Flight origin: Islandia, Peru
- Destination: Iquitos, Peru
- Occupants: 5
- Passengers: 4
- Crew: 1
- Fatalities: 2
- Injuries: 1
- Survivors: 3

On 20 April 2001, the Peruvian Air Force (FAP) shot down a civilian floatplane, killing American Christian missionary Veronica "Roni" Bowers and her infant daughter Charity.

While flying into the Loreto Region of Peru, Bowers, her daughter Charity, husband Jim, and six-year-old son Cory were being followed by a United States Central Intelligence Agency (CIA) observation plane. The Peruvian Air Force was operating as part of the anti-narcotics Air Bridge Denial Program. The CIA did not attempt to identify the tail number of the church-owned plane per procedure.

Roni Bowers and her daughter, Charity

== Events leading to death ==
In a video released by the CIA, the CIA observers were recorded discussing whether the Cessna A185E (with Peruvian registration OB-1408), which had departed the town of Islandia, Loreto; near the Brazilian border, is a "bandido" (drug plane) or an "amigo" (friendly). A CIA officer told Peruvian Air Force official that it may have been possible to have the plane land in Iquitos for inspection. The FAP pilot warned the Cessna for not having an authorized flight plan, but the pilot did not hear it because he was on a different frequency. As the Peruvian Air Force Cessna A-37B prepared to open fire, a CIA officer said that the plane "doesn't fit the profile", and another CIA official said, "Ok, I understand this is not our call, but this guy is at 4,500 feet and he is not taking any evasive action. I recommend we follow him. I do not recommend phase 3 [shooting the plane down] at this time."

A Peruvian official asked if "phase 3" was authorized, and the CIA official replied asking if he was "sure it's a bandido". The Peruvian official replied in the affirmative, and the CIA officer responded, "If you're sure." The CIA pilot said, "This is bullshit" and "I think we're making a mistake." The second CIA officer said, "I agree with you." The Cessna A-37B approached, at which point the pilot of the Bowers's plane made contact with the Iquitos control tower, noting that the FAP had shown up, and that he was not sure what they wanted.

In the confusion, the CIA pilot noted that the pilot of the Bowers's plane was in contact with the tower, but at 15:55 the A-37B opened fire with a minigun. The pilot can be heard yelling, "They're killing me! They're killing us!" The CIA officer said, "Tell them to terminate!" and another officer was heard saying "No! Don't shoot! No más! [No more!]" The plane was on fire, and the CIA observed it crash into the Amazon River, in the Pebas District, and turn upside down.

A CIA officer remarked on the recording that if the FAP had a helicopter in the area, that they should get it there to rescue the passengers. The CIA pilot observed a boat in the river attempting to rescue the plane's occupants, and one officer said, "Get good video of this." In the years since the shootdown, many have said that the CIA "ordered" the Peruvian Air Force to shoot down the plane, when this is not the case.

Bowers and her seven-month-old daughter were killed in the shootdown. The pilot, Kevin Donaldson, was shot in the leg but managed to land the plane. Roni's husband and her son were not injured.

== Aftermath ==
After the event, the US government temporarily suspended the practice of advising foreign governments on shooting down planes over Peru and Colombia. It also paid compensation of $8 million to the Bowers family and the pilot. The program was discontinued in 2001.

According to a statement released by the CIA, its personnel had no authority either to direct or prohibit actions by the Peruvian government, and CIA officers did not shoot down any airplane. In the Bowers case, CIA personnel protested the identification of the missionary plane as a suspect drug trafficker.

A report by the Central Intelligence Agency Office of Inspector General found that the agency had obstructed inquiries into its involvement in the shooting. Pete Hoekstra (the highest ranking Republican on the United States House Permanent Select Committee on Intelligence), who published these findings in November 2008, criticized the CIA for the "needless" deaths.
