= Gulkana, Alaska =

Gulkana C'uul C'ena'
- CDP
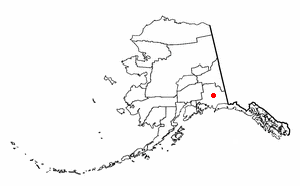
- Location of Gulkana, Alaska
- Coordinates: 62°14′25″N 145°25′22″W
- Country: United States
- State: Alaska
- Census Area: Copper River

Government
  - State senator: Mike Cronk (R)
  - State rep.: Rebecca Schwanke (R)

Area
  - Total: 34.88 sq mi (90.35 km^{2})
  - Land: 34.88 sq mi (90.35 km^{2})
  - Water: 0 sq mi (0.00 km^{2})

Population (2020)
  - Total: 110
  - Density: 3.2/sq mi (1.22/km^{2})
- Time zone: UTC−9 (Alaska (AKST))
  - Summer (DST): UTC−8 (AKDT)
- Area code: 907
- FIPS code: 02-30500

Gulkana /ɡʌlˈkænə/ (C'uul C'ena' in Ahtna Athabascan) is a census-designated place (CDP) in Copper River Census Area, Alaska, U.S. At the 2020 census the population was 110, down from 119 in 2010. It also has an airport.

== Geography and climate ==
Climate chart for Gulkana

Gulkana is located at 62°14′25″N 145°25′22″W (62.240213, −145.422883). According to the United States Census Bureau, the CDP has a total area of 36.5 square miles (95 km^{2}), all of it land.

Gulkana has a continental subarctic climate (Köppen: Dsc).

Climate data for Gulkana Airport, Alaska (1991–2020 normals, (Note: Mean monthly maxima and minima (i.e. the highest and lowest temperature readings during an entire month or year) calculated based on data at said location from 1991 to 2020.) extremes 1909–present)
| Month | Jan | Feb | Mar | Apr | May | Jun | Jul | Aug | Sep | Oct | Nov | Dec | Year |
|---|---|---|---|---|---|---|---|---|---|---|---|---|---|
| Record high °F (°C) | 52 (11) | 53 (12) | 54 (12) | 70 (21) | 85 (29) | 90 (32) | 97 (36) | 88 (31) | 76 (24) | 69 (21) | 48 (9) | 49 (9) | 97 (36) |
| Mean maximum °F (°C) | 33.9 (1.1) | 38.4 (3.6) | 43.1 (6.2) | 56.9 (13.8) | 71.6 (22.0) | 80.7 (27.1) | 80.9 (27.2) | 76.7 (24.8) | 65.5 (18.6) | 53.0 (11.7) | 36.0 (2.2) | 34.8 (1.6) | 83.0 (28.3) |
| Mean daily maximum °F (°C) | 5.0 (−15.0) | 16.1 (−8.8) | 28.0 (−2.2) | 44.4 (6.9) | 58.2 (14.6) | 67.3 (19.6) | 69.3 (20.7) | 64.6 (18.1) | 54.2 (12.3) | 35.9 (2.2) | 15.0 (−9.4) | 7.8 (−13.4) | 38.8 (3.8) |
| Daily mean °F (°C) | −3.4 (−19.7) | 5.6 (−14.7) | 14.7 (−9.6) | 32.6 (0.3) | 45.8 (7.7) | 54.9 (12.7) | 57.9 (14.4) | 53.5 (11.9) | 43.6 (6.4) | 27.1 (−2.7) | 6.8 (−14.0) | −0.2 (−17.9) | 28.2 (−2.1) |
| Mean daily minimum °F (°C) | −11.7 (−24.3) | −4.9 (−20.5) | 1.4 (−17.0) | 20.8 (−6.2) | 33.4 (0.8) | 42.5 (5.8) | 46.5 (8.1) | 42.5 (5.8) | 33.1 (0.6) | 18.3 (−7.6) | −1.4 (−18.6) | −8.2 (−22.3) | 17.7 (−7.9) |
| Mean minimum °F (°C) | −37.9 (−38.8) | −29.4 (−34.1) | −22.9 (−30.5) | −1.2 (−18.4) | 23.1 (−4.9) | 30.7 (−0.7) | 35.2 (1.8) | 28.3 (−2.1) | 17.1 (−8.3) | −4.4 (−20.2) | −24.7 (−31.5) | −31.4 (−35.2) | −42.2 (−41.2) |
| Record low °F (°C) | −60 (−51) | −65 (−54) | −48 (−44) | −42 (−41) | 5 (−15) | 22 (−6) | 29 (−2) | 20 (−7) | 2 (−17) | −23 (−31) | −45 (−43) | −65 (−54) | −65 (−54) |
| Average precipitation inches (mm) | 0.73 (19) | 0.65 (17) | 0.34 (8.6) | 0.22 (5.6) | 0.76 (19) | 1.36 (35) | 1.74 (44) | 1.91 (49) | 1.42 (36) | 1.00 (25) | 0.85 (22) | 0.78 (20) | 11.76 (299) |
| Average snowfall inches (cm) | 9.3 (24) | 10.0 (25) | 3.7 (9.4) | 3.0 (7.6) | 0.6 (1.5) | trace | 0.0 (0.0) | 0.0 (0.0) | 1.4 (3.6) | 9.8 (25) | 9.9 (25) | 10.7 (27) | 58.4 (148) |
| Average precipitation days (≥ 0.01 inch) | 7.7 | 6.5 | 3.9 | 3.2 | 6.5 | 10.5 | 12.8 | 13.0 | 11.3 | 8.9 | 8.3 | 8.3 | 100.9 |
| Average snowy days (≥ 0.1 inch) | 7.7 | 7.0 | 4.6 | 2.2 | 0.4 | 0.1 | 0.0 | 0.0 | 0.9 | 6.7 | 8.3 | 8.5 | 46.4 |
| Average relative humidity (%) | 73.7 | 76.0 | 69.3 | 65.2 | 58.3 | 60.7 | 65.7 | 68.8 | 72.6 | 79.1 | 79.7 | 76.6 | 70.5 |
| Average dew point °F (°C) | −17.1 (−27.3) | −2.2 (−19.0) | 5.4 (−14.8) | 19.6 (−6.9) | 27.9 (−2.3) | 38.7 (3.7) | 44.6 (7.0) | 41.7 (5.4) | 34.0 (1.1) | 20.3 (−6.5) | −0.6 (−18.1) | −11.9 (−24.4) | 16.7 (−8.5) |
Source: NOAA (relative humidity and dew point 1961-1990, snowfall and snowy days 1981–2010)

== Demographics ==
Historical population
| Census | Pop. | Note | %± |
|---|---|---|---|
| 1940 | 25 | | — |
| 1950 | 65 | | 160.0% |
| 1960 | 51 | | −21.5% |
| 1970 | 53 | | 3.9% |
| 1980 | 104 | | 96.2% |
| 1990 | 103 | | −1.0% |
| 2000 | 88 | | −14.6% |
| 2010 | 119 | | 35.2% |
| 2020 | 110 | | −7.6% |
U.S. Decennial Census

Gulkana first appeared on the 1940 U.S. Census as an unincorporated village. In 1960, it was reported as Gulkana Reservation (separate from nearby Gulkana Airport, also an unincorporated community, which had a population of 32). In 1970, it was returned again as Gulkana. It was made a census-designated place (CDP) in 1980.

As of the census of 2000, there were 88 people, 33 households, and 19 families residing in the CDP. The population density was 2.4 inhabitants per square mile (0.93/km^{2}). There were 43 housing units at an average density of 1.2 per square mile (0.46/km^{2}). The racial makeup of the CDP was 26.14% White, 71.59% Native American, and 2.27% from two or more races. 1.14% of the population were Hispanic or Latino of any race.

Of the 33 households, 36.4% had children under the age of 18 living with them, 27.3% were married couples living together, 30.3% had a female householder with no husband present, and 42.4% were non-families. 27.3% of all households were made up of individuals, and 12.1% had someone living alone who was 65 years of age or older. The average household size was 2.67 and the average family size was 3.32.

In the CDP, the population was spread out, with 35.2% under the age of 18, 5.7% from 18 to 24, 29.5% from 25 to 44, 21.6% from 45 to 64, and 8.0% who were 65 years of age or older. The median age was 34 years. For every 100 females, there were 95.6 males. For every 100 females age 18 and over, there were 90.0 males.

The median income for a household in the CDP was $26,875, and the median income for a family was $27,750. Males had a median income of $60,833 versus $0 for females. The per capita income for the CDP was $13,548. There were 35.3% of families and 40.7% of the population living below the poverty line, including 40.0% of under eighteens and none of those over 64.

== Health ==
Sale, importation and possession of alcohol are banned in the village.
