= Murowa diamond mine =

Diamond mine in Mazvihwa, Zimbabwe

Murowa Diamond Mine
- Location in Zimbabwe
- Location: Zimbabwe; 20°29′29″S 30°24′10″E
- Products: Diamonds
- Opened: 2004
- Company: RZ Murowa Holdings Ltd (majority)
- Acquired: 2015

The Murowa diamond mine is a diamond mine in Mazvihwa, south central Zimbabwe, about 40 kilometres from the asbestos mining town of Zvishavane in the Midlands province. The mine is owned and operated by RZM Murowa (Private) Limited, a member of RioZim (a Zimbabwe listed company). The mine is a combination of open pit and underground construction. Current estimates put construction costs at $61 million USD and mine reserves are 19 million tonnes of ore, with an ore grade of 0.9 carats (180 mg) per tonne.

== Geology of the Deposit ==
Murowa consists of three north-trending kimberlite pipes, intrusive into the Chivi suite granites of the Zimbabwe Craton. The kimberlites have been dated at 500 Ma.

== History ==
The Murowa site's possibilities were first realized in 1997 when three diamond-bearing kimberlite pipes were discovered; over a period of three years of study, the two larger pipes have been determined to be economically feasible as mines. Construction of mine facilities was completed in late 2004. Preparation for mining included the forced relocation of 926 people living on the mine site to six farms purchased by a government relocation program. Limited mining operations began in Murowa in 2004, with full capacity expected to be reached sometime in 2005, although permitting problems slowed progress towards this milestone.

In 2018, 1,018,776 tonnes of diamonds were processed.

In 2023, the previous owner of the mine, Harpal Randhawa, died alongside his son and 4 other passengers in a plane crash.
