= Cessna 206 =

American light aircraft

Cessna 205, 206 & 207
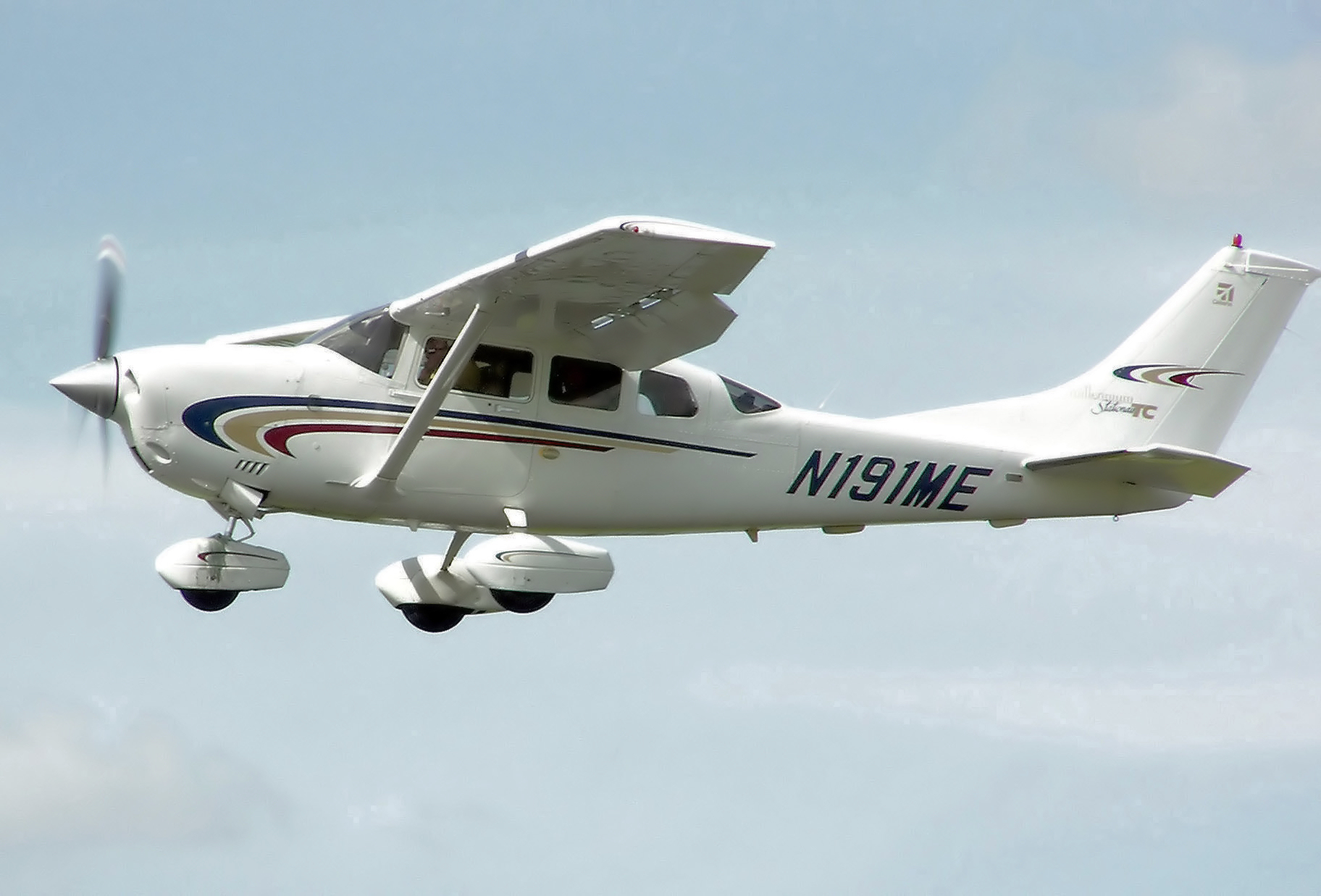
- 2000 model Cessna 206H Stationair

General information
- Type: Light aircraft
- Manufacturer: Cessna
- Status: In production
- Number built: over 8509 (as of approx. 2006)

History
- Manufactured: 1962–1986 and 1998–present
- Introduction date: 1962; 64 years ago (206)
- Developed from: Cessna 210

The Cessna 205, 206 and 207, known primarily as the Stationair (and marketed variously as the Super Skywagon, Skywagon and Super Skylane), are a family of single-engined, general aviation aircraft with fixed landing gear, used in commercial air service as well as for personal use. The family was originally developed from the popular retractable-gear Cessna 210 and produced by the Cessna Aircraft Company.

The line's combination of a powerful engine, rugged construction and a large cabin has made these aircraft popular bush planes. Cessna describes the 206 as "the sport-utility vehicle of the air." These airplanes are also used for aerial photography, skydiving and other utility purposes. They can also be equipped with floats, amphibious floats and skis. Alternatively, they can be fitted with luxury appointments for use as a personal air transport.

From 1962 to 2006 Cessna produced 8,509 aircraft in the 205, 206 and 207 variants. The aircraft remains in production.

== Development ==
=== Cessna 205 ===
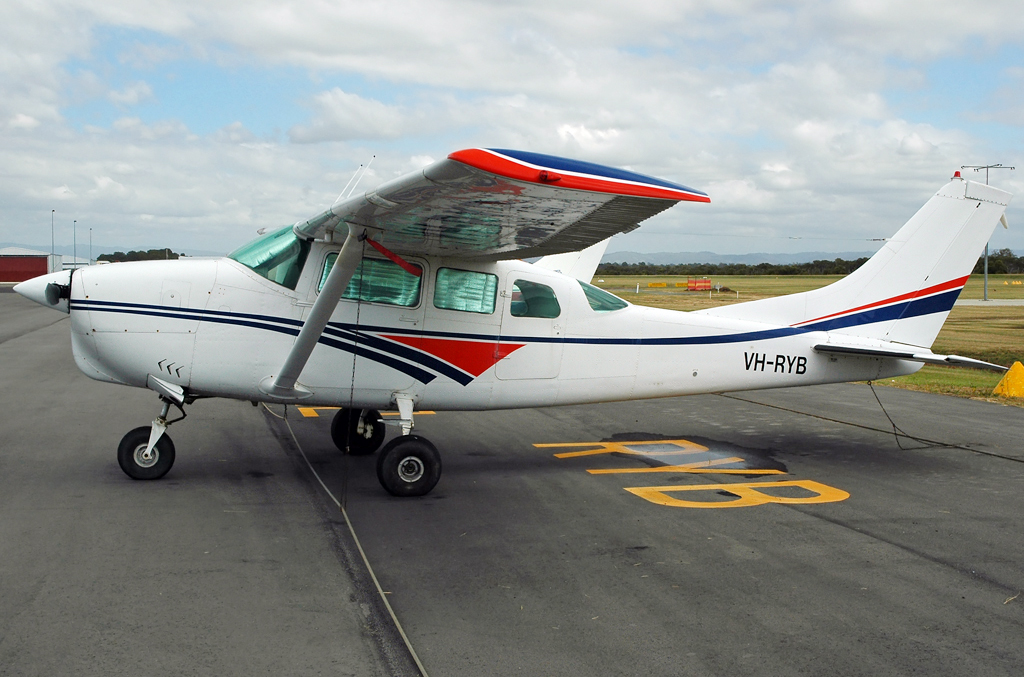
The 205 kept the 210 cowling bulge

The Cessna 205 was introduced late in 1962 as a 1963 model year. The six-seat aircraft was essentially a Cessna 210 with fixed landing gear and with changes to the crew and passenger door arrangement, being officially designated by Cessna as a "Model 210-5". The 205 retained the early 210's engine cowling bulge, originally where the 210 stowed its nosewheel on retraction. This distinctive cowling was made more streamlined on the later Cessna 206.

The 205 is powered by a Continental IO-470-S engine producing 260 hp (190 kW). The 205 was produced in only two model years, 1963 and 1964, before being replaced in production by the Cessna 206. A total of 576 Cessna 205s were produced.

=== Cessna 206 ===
The six-seat Model 206 was introduced as a 1964 model and was built until 1986, when Cessna halted production of its single-engined product line. It was then re-introduced in 1998 and remains in production.

There were many sub-variants, including the U206, P206 all certified to CAR3 standards and later 206H certified to FAR Part 23. The total Model 206 production between 1964 and 2004 was 6,581 aircraft.

==== Cessna U206 ====
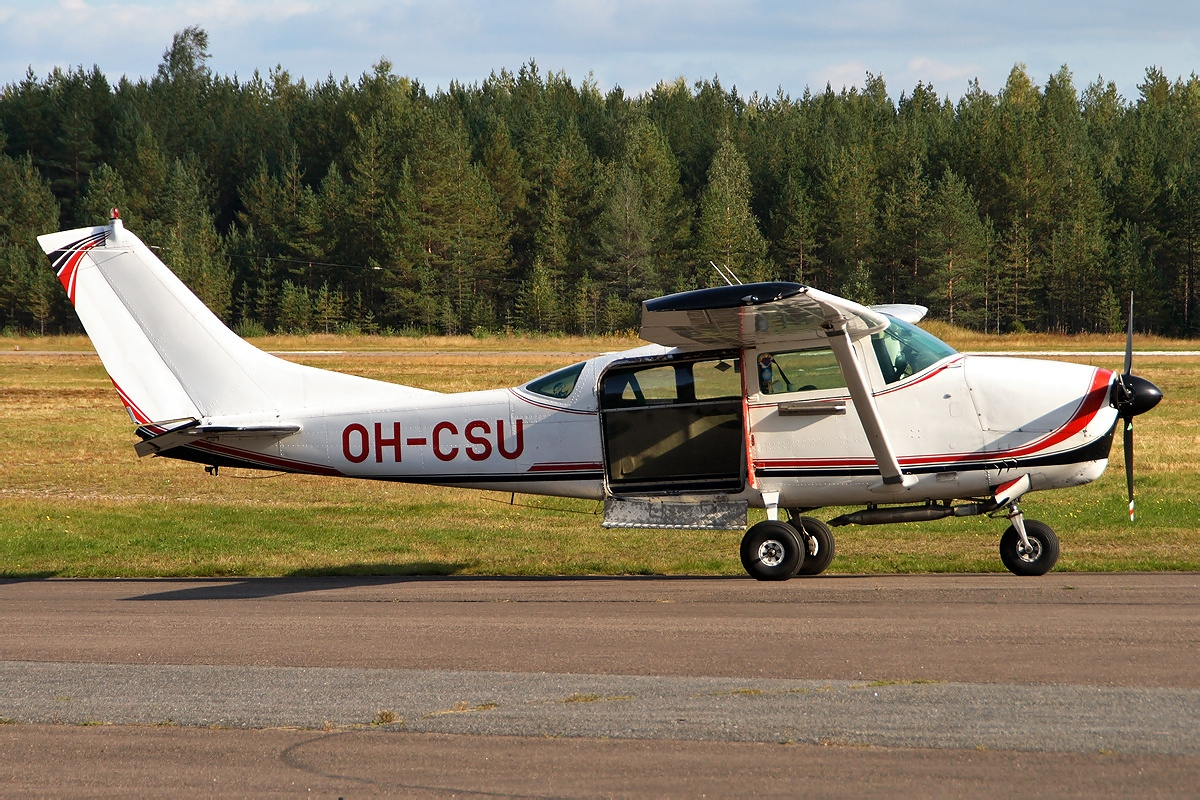
U206 with large clamshell rear door

The original 1964 model was the U206, powered by a 285 hp (213 kW) Continental IO-520-A. The “U” designation indicated “utility” and this model was equipped with a pilot side door and large clamshell rear door serving the back two rows of seats, allowing easy loading of oversized cargo.

There was a TU206 turbocharged version powered by the Continental TSIO-520-C engine producing 285 hp (213 kW). After 1967, the turbo TU206 was powered by a TSIO-520-F of 300 hp (220 kW). The extra 15 hp (11 kW) was obtained by turning the engine at a higher rpm, and was allowed for only five minutes. Due to the large propeller diameter, the additional engine speed meant that the propeller tips were pushed to transonic speeds, which required much more power.

From 1964 to 1969, the U206 was known as the “Super Skywagon”. From 1970, it was named the “Stationair”, a contraction of “Station Wagon of the Air”, which is a good description of the aircraft's intended role. Sub-variants were designated U206 to U206G.

In 1977, the U206 had its engine upgraded to a Continental IO-520-F of 300 hp (220 kW) (continuous rating, obtained at a lower speed than the previous TSIO-520-F) and the TU206 powerplant was changed to the TSIO-520-M producing 310 hp (230 kW).

Production of all versions of the U206 was halted in 1986 when Cessna stopped manufacturing all piston-engined aircraft. A total of 5,208 U206s had been produced.

==== Cessna P206 ====
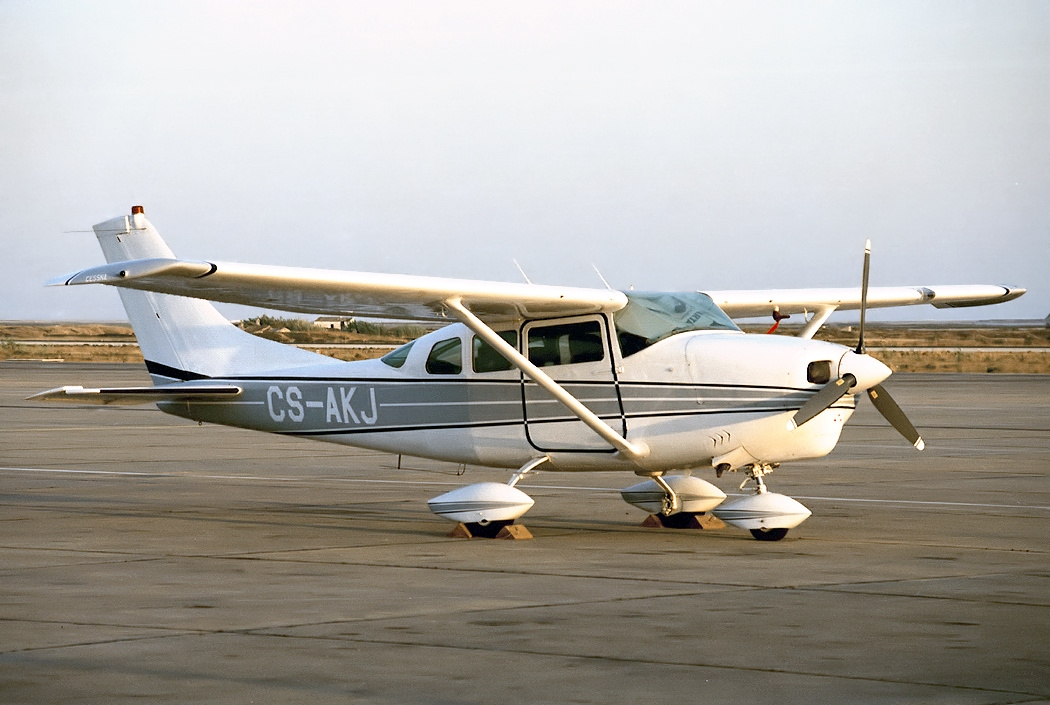
P206 with passenger doors

The P206 was added to the line in 1965. In this case the "P" stood for "passenger", as the P206 had passenger doors similar to the Cessna 210 from which it was derived, on both sides.

The P206 was produced from 1965 to 1970 and was powered by a Continental IO-520-A of 285 hp (213 kW). There was a turbocharged model designated TP206 which was powered by a Continental TSIO-520-A also of 285 hp (213 kW).

Production of the P206 amounted to 647. The name “Super Skylane” made it sound like a version of the Cessna 182, which it was not. Sub-variants were designated P206 to P206E.

==== Cessna 206H ====
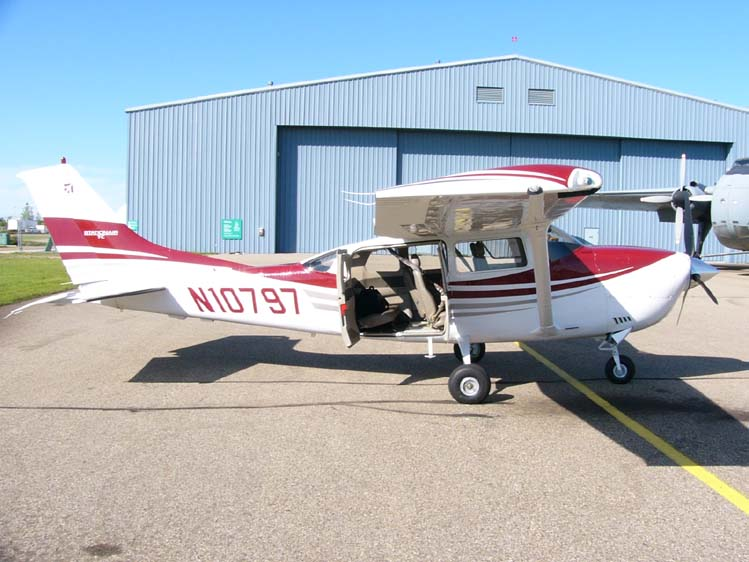
T206H with large clamshell cargo doors

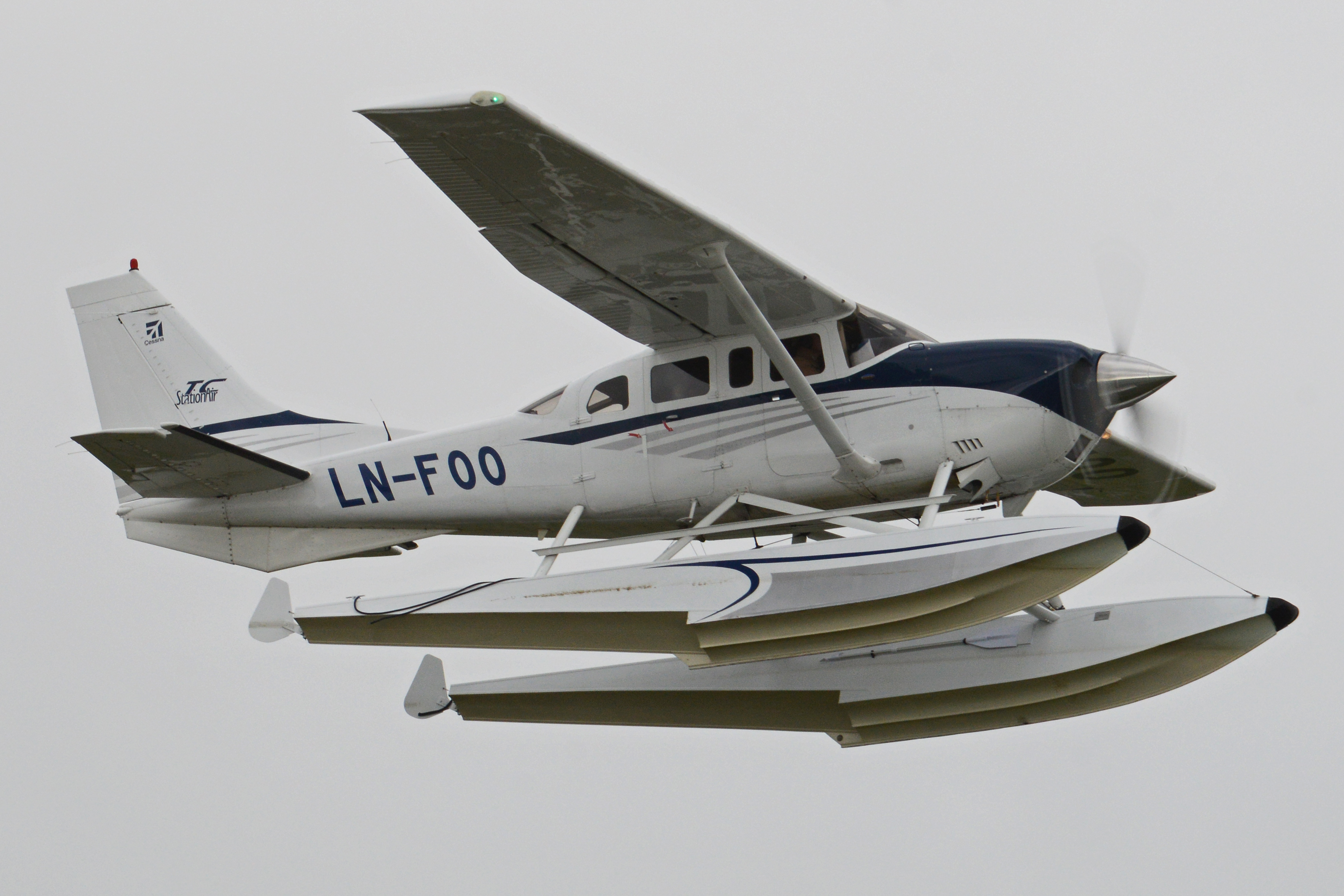
T206H with floats

After a production hiatus of twelve years, Cessna started manufacturing a new version of the venerable 206 in 1998, with the introduction of the newly certified 206H. The “H” model is generally similar to the previous U206 configuration, with a pilot entry door and a rear double clamshell door for access to the middle and back seats. The "H" is marketed under the name "Stationair".

The 206H is powered by a Lycoming IO-540-AC1A powerplant producing 300 hp (220 kW). The turbocharged T206H is powered by a Lycoming TIO-540-AJ1A engine of 310 hp (230 kW).

Even though the Cessna 206H is certified as a six-seat aircraft in its country of origin, the Canadian aviation regulator, Transport Canada has certified it to carry only five people in Canada. This is due to concerns about passenger egress through the rear clamshell door with the flaps extended. Cessna addressed one part of this problem early on, after a flight-test aircraft was damaged when the pilot extended the flaps while taxiing, and his passenger had the clamshell door open (for ventilation; it was a hot summer day). A switch was added to the flap actuation circuit which disabled the flaps when the doors were open. The other part of the problem is that if the flaps are already down, the passenger must perform the complicated procedure of opening the front part as far as possible (about 8 in (20 cm)) then open the rear door and release the spring-loaded rear door handle so it retracts out of the way. This then gives enough clearance to open the rear part of the door fully for egress.

Both the 206H and the T206H remain in production in 2013. By the end of 2004, Cessna had produced 221 206Hs and 505 T206Hs, for a total production of 726 "H" models. Cessna has indicated that they do not intend to produce a P206-configuration aircraft in the future, due to lack of market demand.

=== Cessna 207 ===
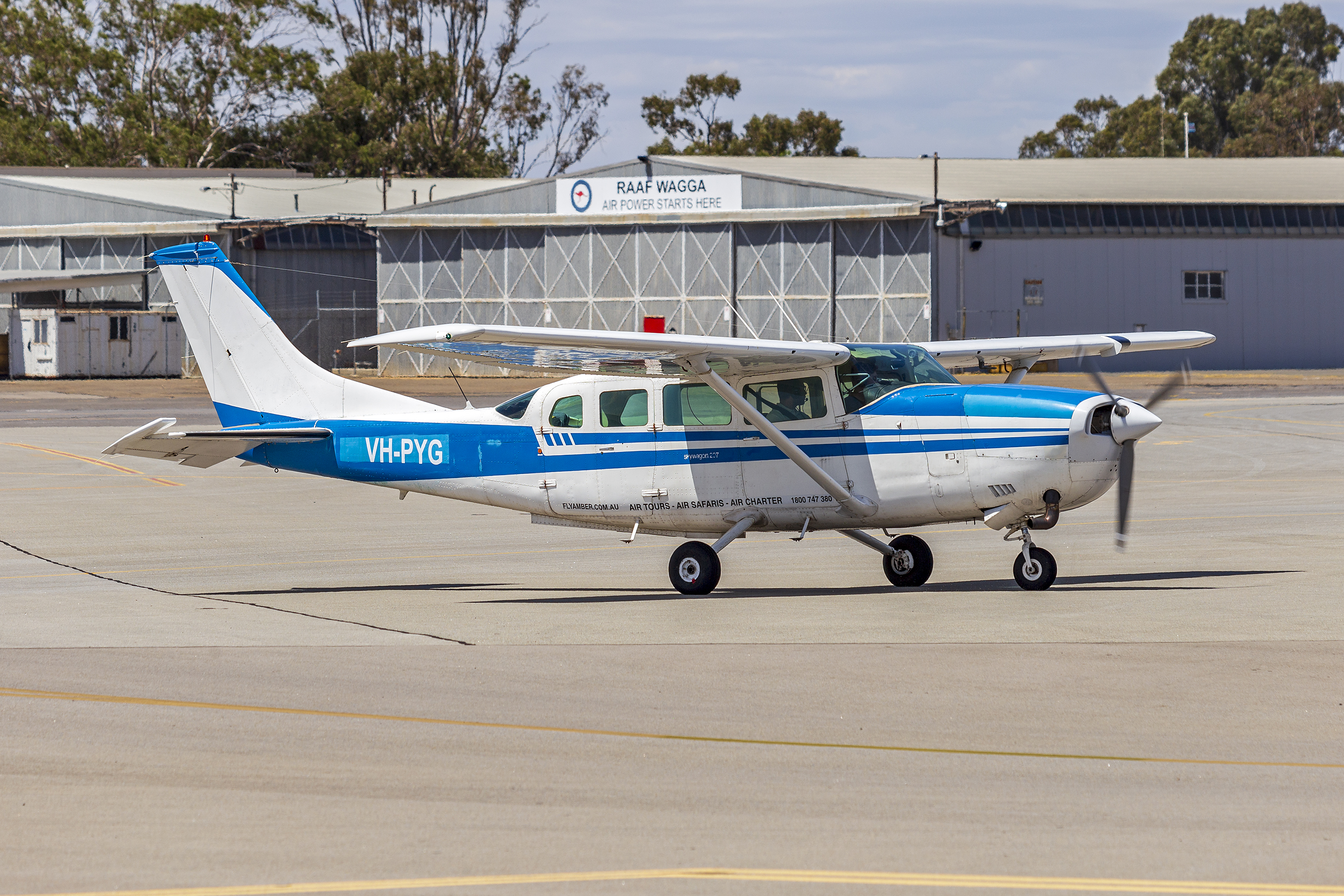
The 207, which incorporates a 45 in (114 cm) stretch

The Model 207 was a seven- and later eight-seat development of the 206, achieved by stretching the design further by 45 inches (114 cm) to allow space for more seats. The nose section was extended 18 inches (46 cm) by adding a constant-section nose baggage compartment between the passenger compartment and the engine firewall; the aft section was extended by 27 inches (69 cm) by inserting a constant-area section in the fuselage area just aft of the aft wing attach point. Thus the propeller's ground clearance was unaffected by the change (the nosewheel had moved forward the same distance as the propeller), but the tail moved aft relative to the mainwheel position, which made landing (without striking the tailskid on the runway) a greater challenge. The move gave the 207 a larger turning radius, since the distance between mainwheels and nosewheel increased by 18 inches (46 cm) but the nosewheel's maximum allowed deflection was not increased.

The 207 was introduced as a 1969 model featuring a Continental IO-520-F engine of 300 hp (220 kW). A turbocharged version was equipped with a TSIO-520-G of the same output.

At the beginning of production the model was called a Cessna 207 "Skywagon", but in 1977 the name was changed to "Stationair 7". 1977 also saw a change of engine on the turbocharged version to a Continental TSIO-520-M producing 310 hp (230 kW) – the same engine used in the TU206 of the same vintage.

The 207 added a seat in 1980 and was then known as the "Stationair 8". Production of the 207 was completed in 1984, just two years before U206 production halted. A total of 626 Cessna 207s were manufactured.

The Cessna Model 207 has been popular with air taxi companies, particularly on short runs where its full seating capacity could be used. Very few of these aircraft have seen private use.

=== Modifications ===
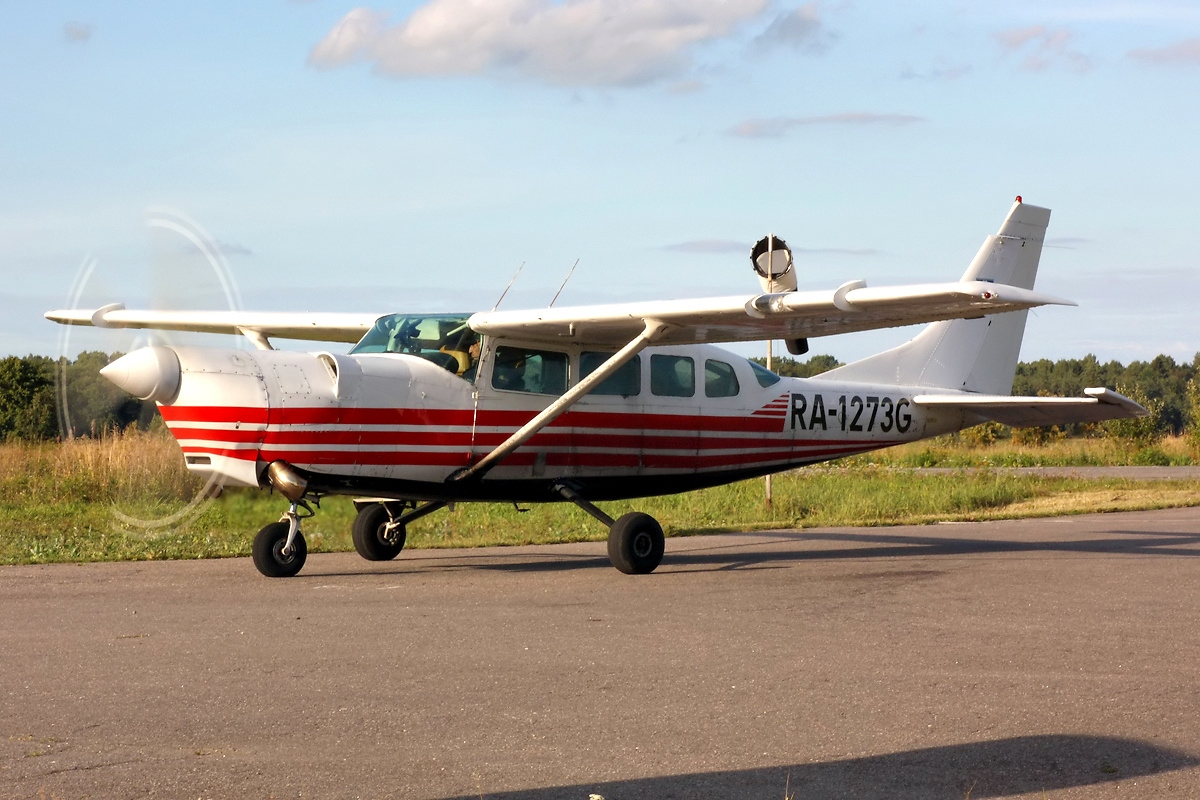
207A with Soloy turbine conversion

In April 2007, Thielert announced that the European Aviation Safety Agency had granted a Supplemental Type Certificate (STC) for conversion of Cessna 206s to the Thielert V-8 diesel powerplant. The STC allows conversion of the following models: U206F and TU206F with the 300 hp (220 kW) powerplant, and the U206G, TU206G, 206H and T206H with the 310 hp (230 kW) version. This modification does not require any changes to the engine cowling. In May 2008, Thielert entered insolvency proceedings, so the future availability of this diesel conversion is uncertain.

Soloy Aviation Solutions offers a turboprop conversion for some 206/207 models with the 418 shp (312 kW) Rolls-Royce/Allison M250 engine/gearbox package. However, extensive engine cowl modifications are required.

Atlantic Aero offers an FAA STC conversion to the Continental IO-550 powerplant. No cowl modifications are required.

Both Kenmore Air (Edo floats) and Wipaire (Wipline floats) offer seaplane conversions.

== Variants ==
Cessna has historically used model years similar to U.S. auto manufacturers, with sales of new models typically starting a few months prior to the actual calendar year.

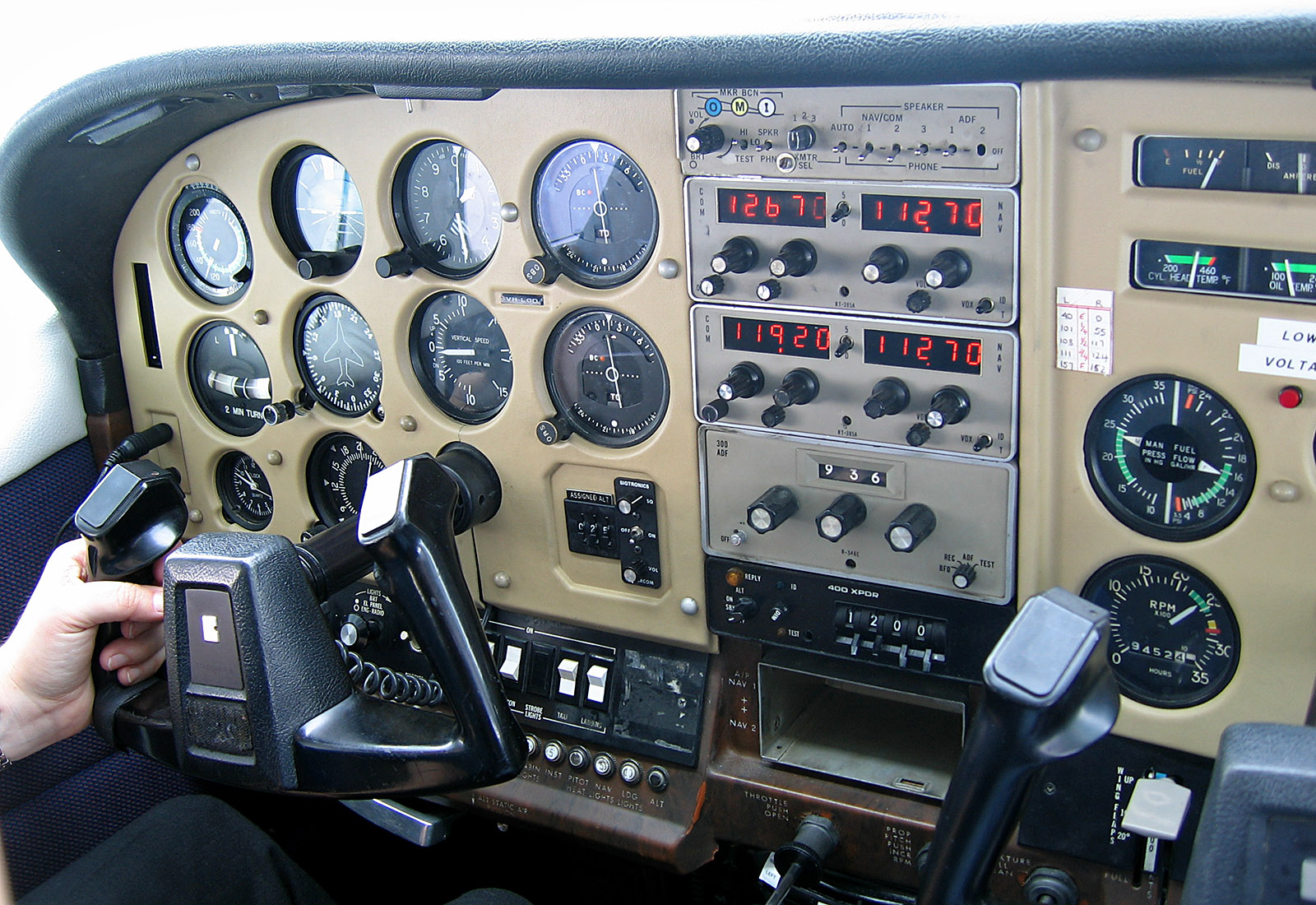
U206 instrument panel

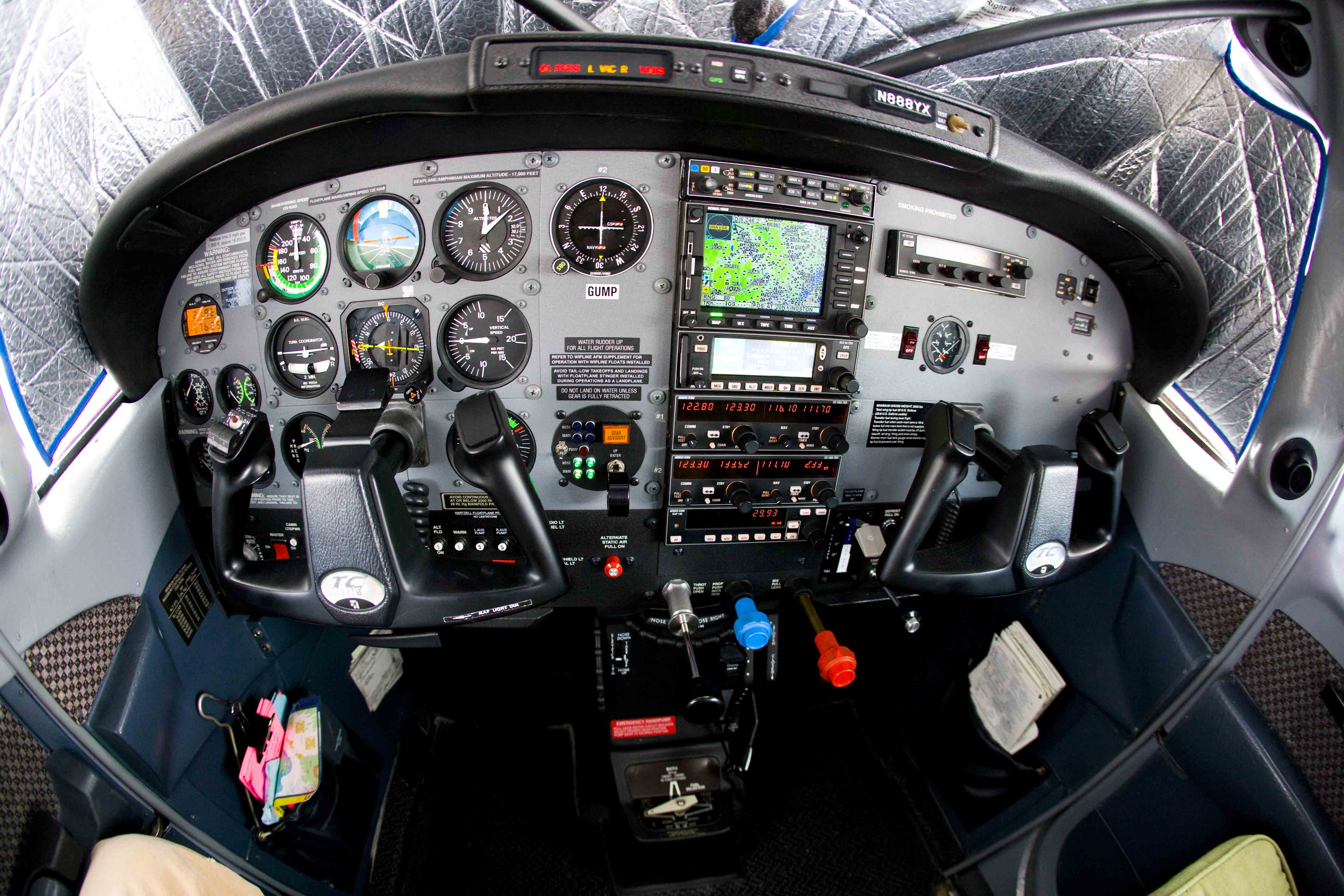
T206H classic instrument panel

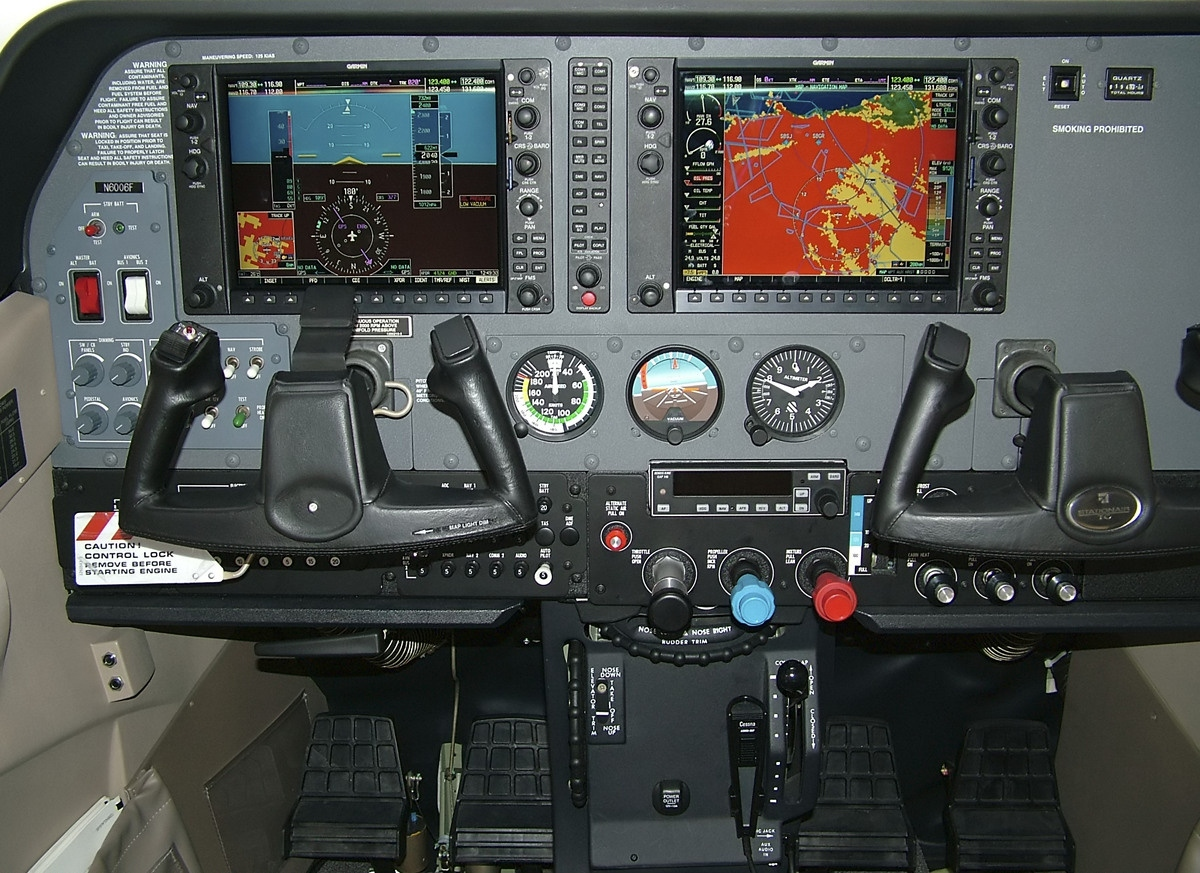
Garmin G1000 glass cockpit in a T206H

=== Cessna 205 ===
205 (Model 210-5)
The 205 was introduced for the 1963 model year as a variant of the Cessna 210 with fixed landing gear. It had six seats, three doors (two on the left and one on the right), was powered by a 260 hp (194 kW) Continental IO-470-S engine, and had a gross weight of 3,300 lb (1,497 kg). Certified on June 14, 1962. 480 built. (Note: Sources sometimes differ on the exact number of each variant were built. This article uses the construction numbers found in the aircraft's Federal Aviation Administration type certificate to determine production figures whenever possible.)
205A (Model 210-5A)
1964 model year with minor detail changes. Certified on July 19, 1963. 97 built.

=== Cessna 206 ===
206 Super Skywagon
Introduced for the 1964 model year, the 206 differed from the 205 primarily in that it was powered by a 285 hp (213 kW) Continental IO-520-A. Other changes included a strengthened fuselage, all entry doors removed except the pilot's door on the left side, new 42 in (110 cm) removable double cargo doors on the right side, and heavy-duty brakes. The interior was also redesigned with durable and easy cleaning materials. Only the pilot's seat came as standard, though three optional seating arrangements were offered with up to six seats. Other optional equipment included heavy-duty main tires, floats, skis, a 300 lb (136 kg) fuselage cargo pod, 150 US gal (568 L) tank and spray boom for agricultural use, and an air ambulance configuration. The aircraft had a gross weight of 3,300 lb (1,497 kg) as a landplane or 3,500 lb (1,588 kg) as a seaplane. Certified on July 19, 1963.
For the 1965 model year, Cessna rebranded the 206 as a utility aircraft as the U206 Super Skywagon. The U206 was otherwise similar to the previous year's 206, having only minor detail changes. Certified on October 8, 1964. One prototype of a turbocharged version was also built as the TU206.
1965 also introduced a passenger version of the 206 as the P206 Super Skylane. Unlike the 206/U206, the P206 retained the three-door/six-seat standard layout of the 205 and did not have a cargo door. The aircraft also had a deluxe interior, revised nose contours, and other minor changes. Certified on October 8, 1964.
A total of 597 aircraft were built; 275 (206), 162 (U206), and 160 (production P206).
U206A Super Skywagon
1966 model year with a three-bladed propeller and a 60A alternator replacing the 50A generator of previous variants. A mortuary option was also introduced with room for one casket. In addition to the passenger P206A, turbocharged versions powered by a 285 hp (213 kW) Continental TSIO-520-C were also offered as the TU206A Turbo Super Skywagon and TP206A Turbo Super Skylane. Certified on September 24 (U206A/P206A) and December 20 (TU206A/TP206A), 1965. 365 total built; 219 (U206A/TU206A), 146 (P206A/TP206A).
U206B Super Skywagon
1967 model year with minor detail changes and powered by a 300 hp (224 kW) Continental IO-520-F engine. Also built in a passenger P206B and turbocharged TU206B and TP206B variants, all retaining their previous 285 hp (213 kW) IO-520-A and TSIO-520-C engines. Certified on August 3, 1966. 371 total built; 258 (U206B/TU206B) and 113 (P206B/TP206B).
U206C Super Skywagon
1968 model year with minor detail changes and an increased gross weight of 3,600 lb (1,633 kg). Also built in passengerP206C and turbocharged TU206C and TP206C variants. Certified on July 20, 1967. 420 total built; 320 (U206C/TU206C) and 100 (P206C/TP206C).
U206D Skywagon 206
1969 model year with minor changes, as well as a larger fin and rudder on the floatplane version. Also built in passenger P206D and turbocharged TU206D and TP206D variants. Utility variants were renamed as the "Skywagon 206", while the passenger variants kept the "Super Skylane" name. Certified on September 18, 1968. 294 total built; 210 (U206D/TU206D) and 84 (P206D/TP206D).
U206E Skywagon 206/Stationair
Introduced for the 1970 model year with a redesigned cowling and minor changes. Also built in passenger P206E and turbocharged TU206E and TP206E variants. The 1971 model year was renamed as the Stationair and Turbo Stationair, and featured a restyled interior, electroluminescent subpanel lighting, and a revised glareshield. The passenger P206 and TP206 were discontinued after the 1970 model year. Certified on July 28, 1969. 300 total built; 143 (1970 U206E/TU206E), 113 (1971 U206E/TU206E) and 44 (1970 P206E/TP206E), not including a P206E that was converted from the first production P206.
U206F Stationair
Introduced for the 1972 model year with a "Camber-Lift" wing, a foam-padded control wheel, nose-mounted landing/taxi lights, a glareshield-mounted avionics annunciator panel, and an enlarged baggage compartment. The 1973 model year introduced an overhear dome light in the rear cabin as well as bonded cabin doors with "Trimline" door handles. 1974 introduced integral cabin door armrests and handles, while 1975 introduced redesigned wheel/brake fairings, a removeable right lower cowl on the TU206F, an optional flush-mounted communications antenna, and the Stationair II preferred options package. 1976 introduced energy-absorbing instrument sub-panels and a Vernier mixture control. Also built as the turbocharged TU206F. Certified on October 26, 1971. 1,820 total built; 174 (1972), 325 (1973), 380 (1974), 440 (1975), and 501 (1976).
U206G Stationair/Stationair 6
Introduced for the 1977 model year with a new nosewheel leg. The TU206G was powered by a turbocharged 310 hp (231 kW) Continental TSIO-520-M engine. The 1978 model year was renamed as the Stationair 6 and introduced a 28V electrical system and optional club seating with a writing desk. Optional air conditioning was offered for the 1986 model year. Certified on June 21, 1976. 3,500 total built; 554 (1977, including one prototype), 575 (1978), 661 (1979), 610 (1980), 520 (1981), 260 (1982), 89 (1983), 58 (1984), 74 (1985), and 100 (1986).
206H Stationair
Introduced in 1998 with a 300 hp (224 kW) Lycoming IO-540-AC1A5 engine. A turbocharged variant powered by a 310 hp (231 kW) Lycoming TIO-540-AJ1A engine was introduced in 1999 as the T206H Turbo Stationair (also known as Stationair TC). Certified on November 26, 1997 (206H) and October 1, 1998 (T206H). Production of the 206H ended in 2013 with a total of 369 being produced. An improved version of the T206H known as the Turbo Stationair HD was introduced in July 2016 with gross weight increased by 189 lb (86 kg). As of 2023, the T206H Turbo Stationair HD is the only model still in production, with 1,264 being built as of 2017.

=== Cessna 207 ===
207 Skywagon 207
Introduced for the 1969 model year as a development of the U206C with a stretched cabin allowing for a seventh seat, powered by a 300 hp (224 kW) Continental IO-520-F engine, and with a gross weight of 3,800 lb (1,724 kg). The 1970 model year introduced a new control wheel design, an optional gray instrument panel, an optional mortuary variant with room for a single casket, and a turbocharged variant powered by a 300 hp (224 kW) Continental TSIO-520-G engine as the T207 Turbo Skywagon 207. 1973 introduced larger, padded control wheels, revised avionics, bonded-cabin doors, a new glareshield, and new wheel fairings. 1974 introduced integral cabin door armrests and handles, revised avionics, and an optional 28V electrical system. 1975 introduced removeable rear cabin air outlets and a revised glareshield. Certified on December 31, 1968. 362 total built; 148 (1969), 42 (1970), 15 (1971), 10 (1972), 12 (1973), 40 (1974), 47 (1975), and 48 (1976).
207A Skywagon 207/Stationair 7/Stationair 8
Introduced for the 1977 model year with an improved Vernier mixture control, energy-absorbing instrument subpanels, a rectangular hour meter, and an improved aileron control system. The T207's engine was also changed to a 310 hp (231 kW) Continental TSIO-520-M. For the 1978 model year, the 207A and T207A were renamed to Stationair 7 and Turbo Stationair 7, respectively, and the previously optional 28V electrical system was made standard, and 1979 introduced a long-hub propeller and spinner. 1980 saw the introduction of an eighth seat and yet another name change to Stationair 8 and Turbo Stationair 8, as well as optional six-place club seating, a pull-type alternator circuit breaker, and a new flap position indicator. 1984 introduced new fuel caps, shoulder harnesses for all seats, copilot controls, and other minor changes. Certified on July 12, 1976 (seven seats) and September 11, 1979 (eight seats). 426 total built; 52 (1977), 68 (1978), 80 (1979), 92 (1980), 75 (1981), 33 (1982), 5 (1983), and 21 (1984).

== Operators ==
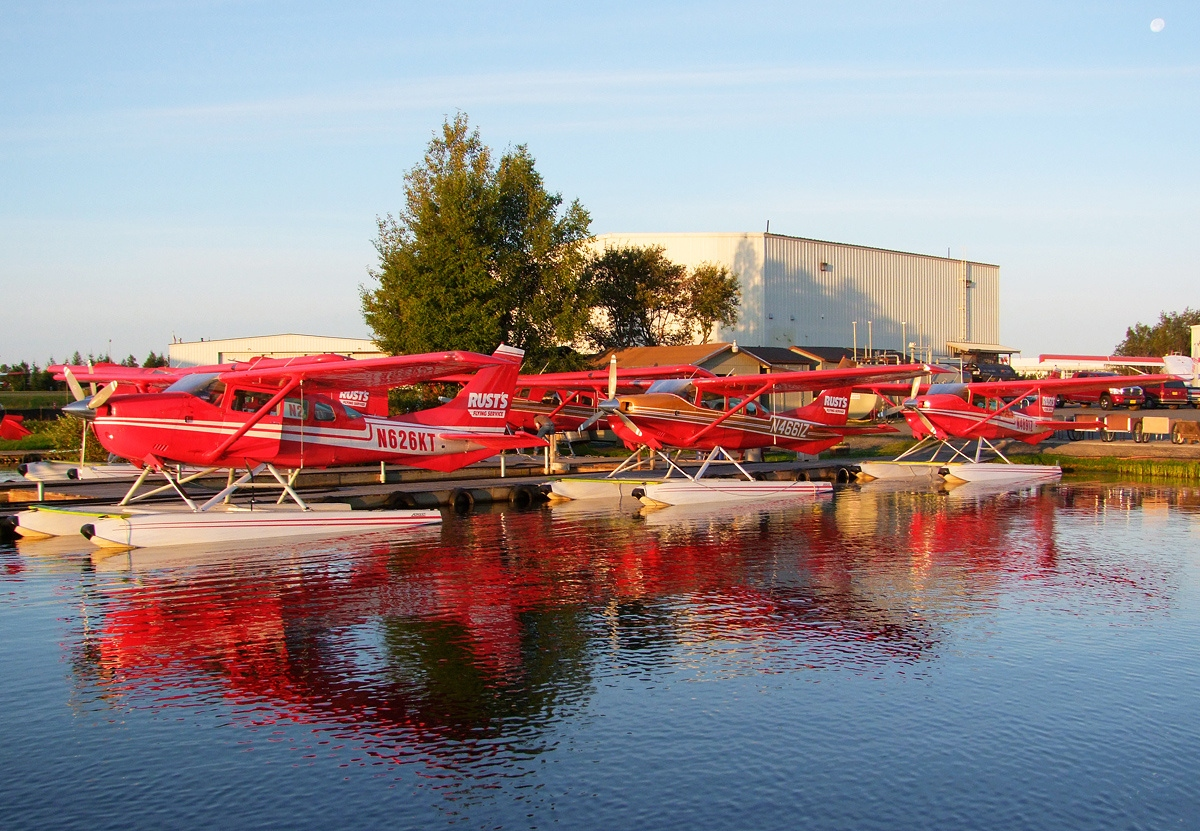
206s on floats in Anchorage

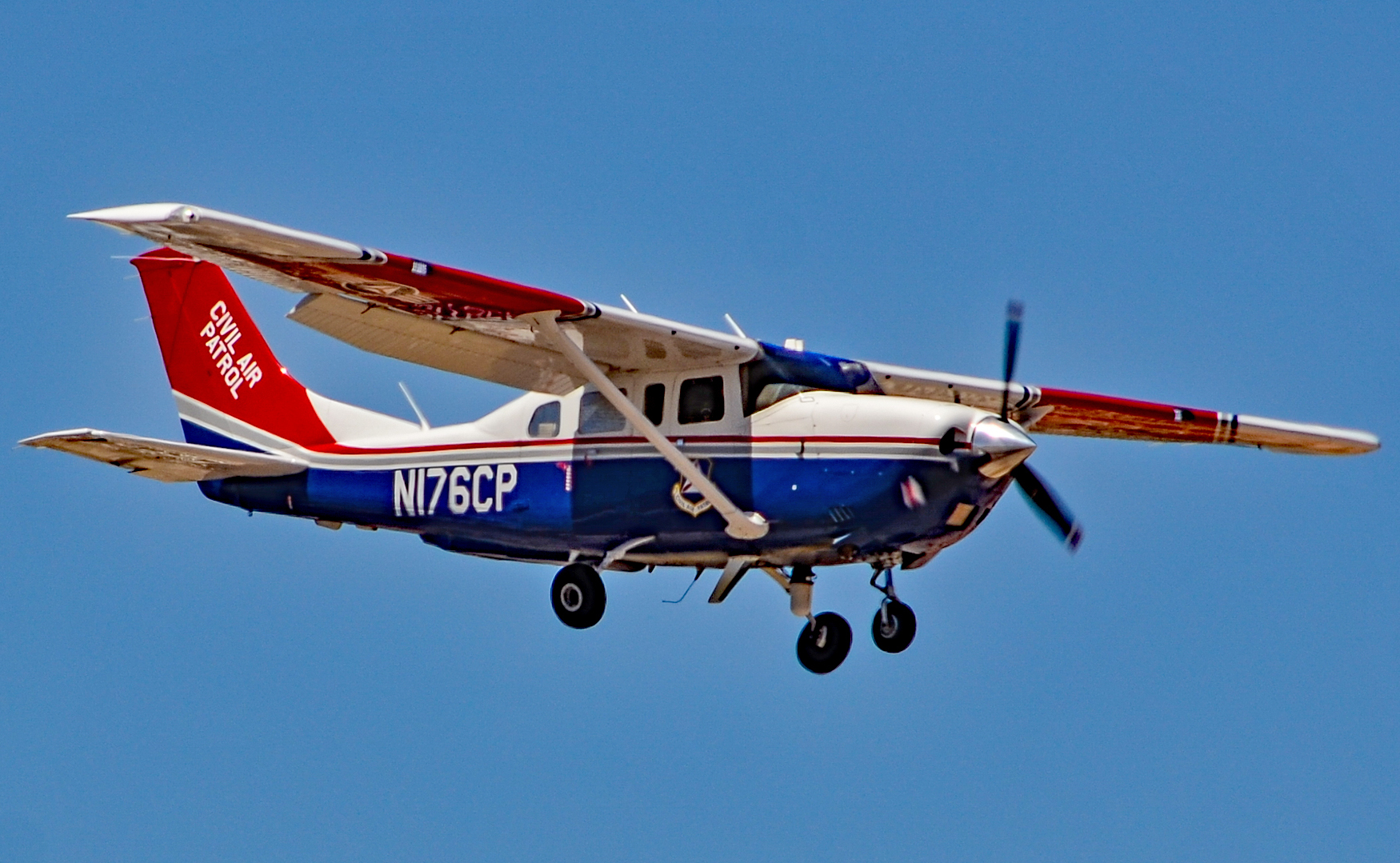
Civil Air Patrol T206H

=== Civil ===
The aircraft is popular with air charter companies and small cargo air carriers, and is operated by private individuals and companies. One of the largest Cessna 207 operators was Yute Air Alaska, which had a fleet of 12 aircraft. Canwest Air operates two Cessna 206 aircraft in Northern Alberta, which are the backbone of their charter fleet.

=== Government ===
Argentina

- Argentine Federal Police – one P206A (confiscated from drug smugglers) operated from 1995 which remains in service as of 2020.
- Argentine National Gendarmerie – two U206 donated by US in 1975.

Canada

- Ottawa Police Service – one U206G in the surveillance aircraft role

Colombia

- National Police of Colombia

France

- Directorate-General of Customs and Indirect Taxes – operates two Cessna T206 as of July 2018, which are due for retirement.
- Institut Geographique National

Indonesia

- Indonesian National Police

United States

- Civil Air Patrol – one 206H, 25 T206H, 13 U206G
- South Dakota Highway Patrol – One T206H
- United States Marshals – at least six T206H surveillance aircraft starting in 2001 under a front company named Early Detection Alarm Systems
- Alameda County Sheriff's Office – U206G surveillance aircraft N5525U

=== Military ===
Argentina

- Argentine Army, six × T207

Bolivia

- Bolivian Air Force, two × U206C and 7 × TU206G

Colombia
Chile

- Chilean Air Force, Operated between 1974 and 1980 the very first Cessna 206 (c/n 0001) as FACh 415, then sold it to civilian market.

Costa Rica

- Public Force of Costa Rica operated at least four U206s from 1985.

Djibouti

- Djibouti Air Force, one × U206G

Dominican Republic

- Dominican Air Force one example

Ecuador

- Ecuadorian Air Force

Guatemala

- Guatemalan Air Force operated at least four U206s from 1968

Guyana

- Guyana Defence Force

India
Indonesia

- Indonesian Air Force – T207

Israel

- Israeli Air Force

Madagascar

- The Malagasy Air Force received five second hand Cessna 206s in June 2019.

Mexico

- Mexican Air Force

Malaysia
Pakistan

- Pakistan Army Aviation 4 T-206H

Panama

- Panamanian Air Force operated at least one Cessna 206 and one Cessna 207 from 1984.

Paraguay

- Paraguayan Air Force 5 U206G
- Paraguayan Naval Aviation 4 U206A/C
- Paraguayan Army Aviation 2 U206G

Peru
Philippines

- Philippine Army

Portugal

- Portuguese Air Force – 1 Cessna 206 operated 1968–1974.

Suriname

- Suriname Air Force

Timor-Leste

- Timor-Leste Defence Force Light Air Component

United States

- US Army: Two used by US Military Academy since 2021.

Uruguay

- Uruguayan Air Force

Venezuela

- Venezuelan Army

== Accidents ==
- July 24, 1972 near Aspen, Colorado, a 27-year-old student pilot with a total of 39 hours of flying time flew a Cessna U206, registered N5290U, into a blind canyon and stalled the aircraft while trying to turn around, killing all four people on board. Among the passengers was wealthy playboy, entrepreneur, racing driver and developer Lance Reventlow, who was a Woolworth heir, son of Barbara Woolworth Hutton and the husband of former Mouseketeer and actress Cheryl Holdridge.
- On May 1, 2023, a Cessna 206 with seven people on board crashed in the jungle in the Caquetá Department of Colombia. Two of the occupants – the pilot and one adult – were killed on impact. Another passenger, the mother of the remaining four, all children, died soon after the crash. The children, between 11 months and 13 years old, survived for over five weeks in the rainforest before being rescued by the Colombian military and rescuers.
- On September 29, 2023, a Cessna 206 aircraft owned by RioZim was en route from Harare to the Murowa diamond mine in Zimbabwe when the plane crashed near the mine. All 6 people aboard the plane died in the crash, including the owner of the mine Harpal Randhawa.
- On May 26, 2024, a Cessna 206 with 7 people on board (pilot, 6 passengers) crashed in Butler, Missouri while on a skydiving flight. Everyone survived as they managed to escape before the crash using parachutes.

== Specifications (206H Stationair) ==
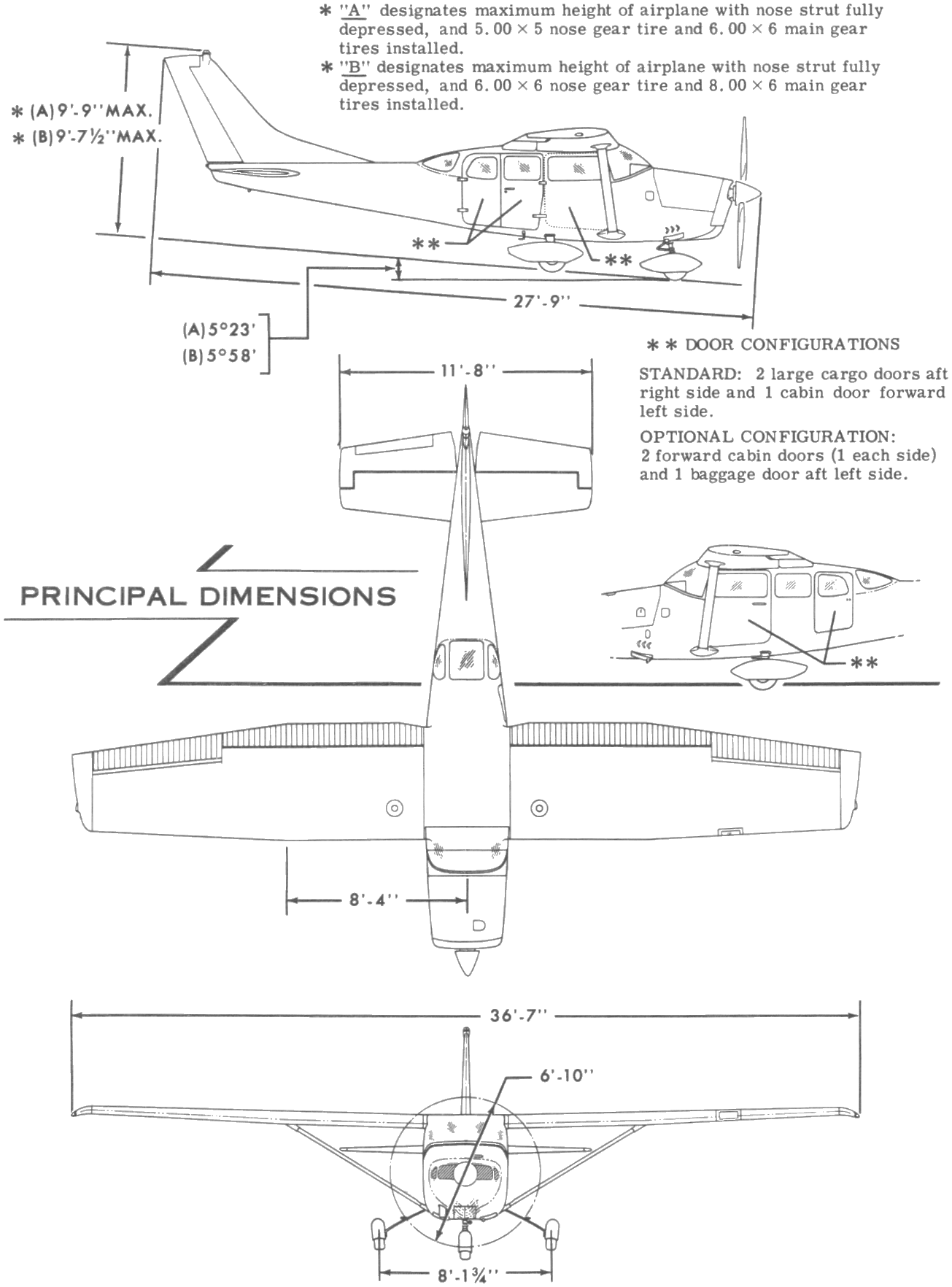
3-view line drawing of the Cessna TU206A Super Skywagon

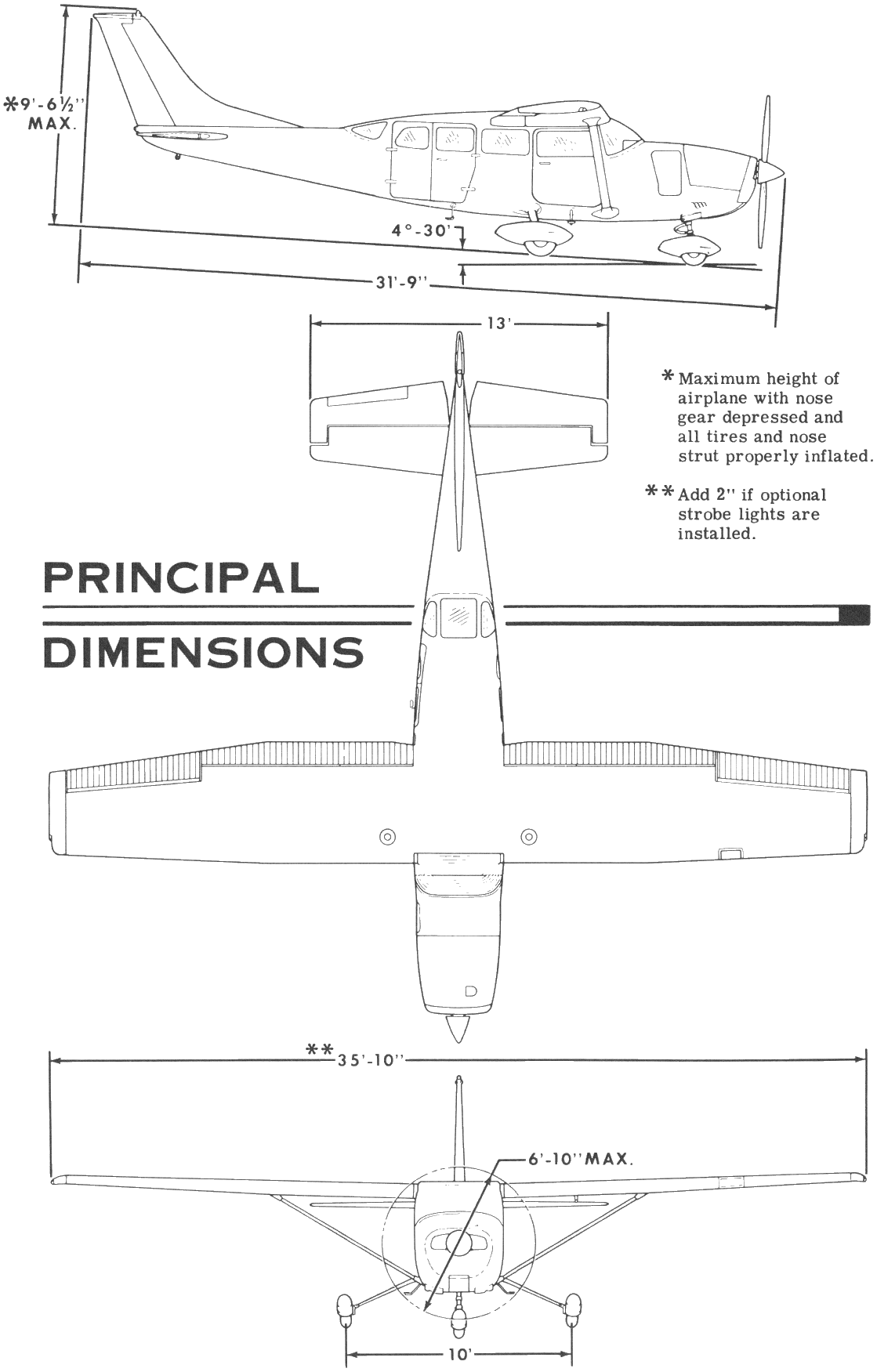
3-view line drawing of the Cessna 207 Skywagon

Data from Jane's All The World's Aircraft 2003–2004

General characteristics

- Crew: one
- Capacity: five passengers
- Length: 28 ft 3 in (8.61 m)
- Wingspan: 36 ft 0 in (10.97 m)
- Height: 9 ft 3 1/2 in (2.832 m)
- Wing area: 175.5 sq ft (16.30 m^{2})
- Empty weight: 2,176 lb (987 kg)
- Max takeoff weight: 3,600 lb (1,633 kg)
- Powerplant: 1 × Lycoming IO-540-AC1A naturally aspirated air-cooled flat-six engine, 300 hp (220 kW)
- Propellers: 3-bladed McCauley metal constant-speed propeller

Performance

- Maximum speed: 174 mph (280 km/h, 151 kn) at sea level
- Cruise speed: 163 mph (262 km/h, 142 kn) at 6,200 ft (1,900 m) (75% power)
- Stall speed: 63 mph (101 km/h, 55 kn) (flaps down)
- Range: 840 mi (1,350 km, 730 nmi) at 6,500 ft (2,000 m) (max fuel, 45 min reserves)
- Service ceiling: 15,700 ft (4,800 m)
- Rate of climb: 988 ft/min (5.02 m/s)

== See also ==
Related development

- Cessna 182
- Cessna 210

Aircraft of comparable role, configuration, and era

- Piper PA-32 Cherokee Six

== Bibliography ==
- Cessna 206H Specifications
- Thielert Aircraft Engines GmbH Press release about Cessna 206 engine development
- Cessna 206 Modifications
- Andrade, John (1982). Militair 1982. London: Aviation Press Limited. ISBN 0-907898-01-7.
- Flores, Santiago A. (May 2001). "From Cavalry to Close Air Support". Air International. Vol. 60, no. 5. pp. 298–303. ISSN 0306-5634.
- Hagedorn, Daniel P. (1993). Central American and Caribbean Air Forces. Tonbridge, Kent, UK: Air-Britain (Historians) Ltd. ISBN 0-85130-210-6.
- Jackson, Paul (2003). Jane's All The World's Aircraft 2003–2004. Coulsdon, UK: Jane's Information Group. ISBN 0-7106-2537-5.
- Niccoli, Riccardo (May–June 1998). "Portuguese Numerology: Serial systems used by the Aeronautica Militar and the Força Aerea Portuguesa". Air Enthusiast. No. 75. pp. 33–45. ISSN 0143-5450.
- Rivas, Santiago (September 2020). "Fighting Criminals all over Argentina". Air International. Vol. 99, no. 3. pp. 80–83. ISSN 0306-5634.
- Rivas, Santiago (April 2021). "Cracking the Drug cartels". Air International. Vol. 100, no. 4. pp. 46–49. ISSN 0306-5634.
- Simpson, Rod (2005). The General Aviation Handbook. Hinckley, UK: Midland Publishing. ISBN 1-85780-222-5.
- Taylor, John W.R. (1971). Jane's All The World's Aircraft 1971–1972. London, UK: Jane's Yearbooks.
