= Mashava =

Mashava Mashaba
- Village
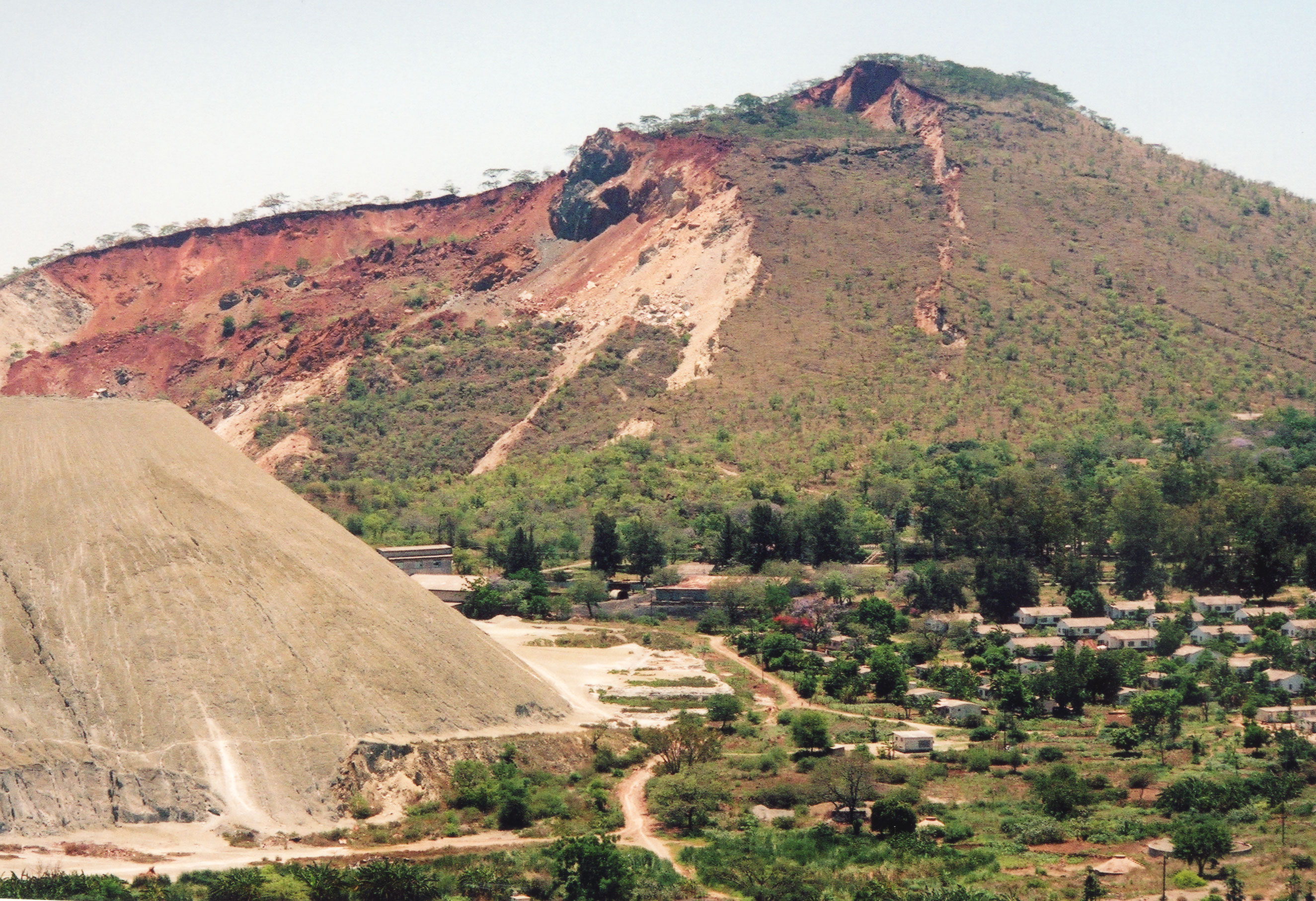
- King Mine, Mashaba

- Mashava in Zimbabwe map
- Coordinates: 20°03′S 30°28′E
- Country: Zimbabwe
- Province: Masvingo Province
- Time zone: UTC+2 (CAT)
- Climate: Cwa

Mashava, originally known as Mashaba, is a mining village in Masvingo Province, Zimbabwe.

This city is one of many mining cities in Zimbabwe. Although there aren't many blueprints for the mines, it is still a part of Zimbabwe's economy, because of the resources that can be collected.
