= Chitina Airport =

Chitna Airport
- IATA: CXC; ICAO: PAAX; FAA LID: CXC

Summary
- Airport type: Public/civil
- Location: Chitina, Alaska
- Opened: January 7, 1962; 64 years ago
- Elevation AMSL: 556 ft (169 m)
- Coordinates: 61°34′58″N 144°25′41″W

Map
- Location within Alaska

Runways
Direction	Length		Surface
Direction	ft	m	Surface
13/31	2,850	869	Gravel
- Source: Federal Aviation Administration

Chitina Airport (IATA: CXC, ICAO: PAAX, FAA LID: CXC) is a public/civil-use airport located 4 mi (6.4 km) north of Chitina, Alaska, United States.

== Facilities ==
Chitina Airport covers an area of 0 acres (0 ha) which contains one asphalt paved runway (13/31) measuring 2,850 ft × 75 ft (869 m × 23 m). For the 12-month period ending December 31, 2019, the airport had 1,750 aircraft operations. At that time, there was one aircraft based at this airport, a single-engine.

== Airlines and destinations ==
Airlines	Destinations
Wrangell Mountain Air	McCarthy

== See also ==
- List of airports in Alaska
