= Vernier throttle =

A vernier throttle is a throttle often used in aircraft. It uses a cable and a screw mechanism to provide the operator precise control over an engine's operation. A pilot can quickly adjust the throttle on a coarse level by pushing or pulling on the handle, but can also make fine-grained adjustments by twisting the knob left or right. The concept is similar in use to vernier calipers which have a primary scale for gross measurements, and a secondary scale for fine measurements. Like other inventions that bear his name, the Vernier throttle is based on the work of mathematician Pierre Vernier.

Vernier throttles are commonly used in aircraft. A similar mechanism is also used in reciprocating (gasoline) aircraft engines to set the mixture to an appropriate value for a given altitude.
