= Cessna 185 Skywagon =

American light aircraft

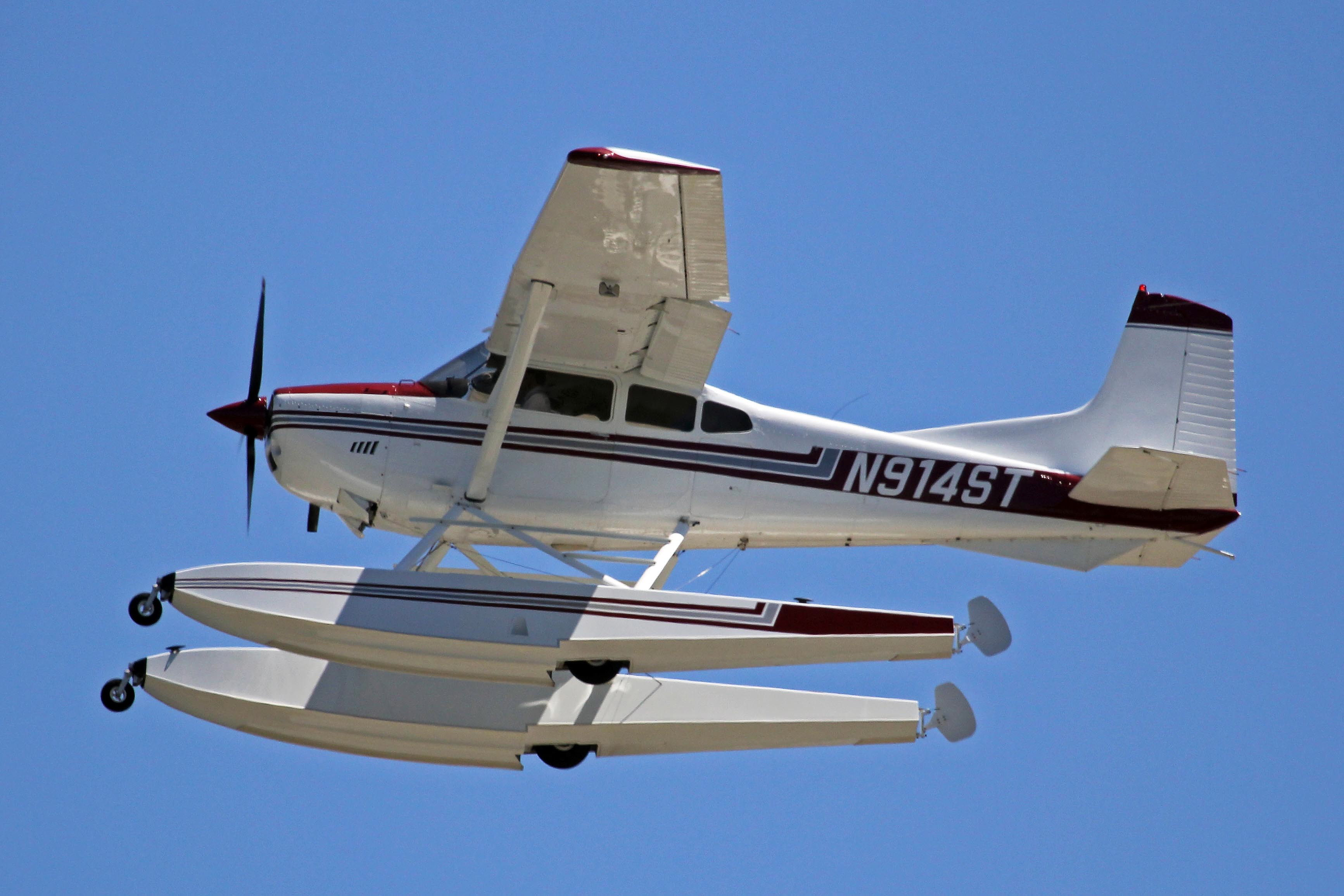
- A Cessna 185 with floats

General information
- Type: Light utility aircraft
- Manufacturer: Cessna Aircraft Company
- Status: Active
- Number built: 3,916

History
- Manufactured: 1961–1985
- Introduction date: 1961; 65 years ago
- First flight: July 1960; 66 years ago
- Developed from: Cessna 180
- Variant: St-Just Super-Cyclone

The Cessna 185 Skywagon is a six-seat, single-engined, general aviation light aircraft manufactured by Cessna. It first flew as a prototype in July 1960, with the first production model completed in March 1961. The Cessna 185 is a high-winged aircraft with non-retractable conventional landing gear and a tailwheel.

Over 4,400 were built with production ceasing in 1985. When Cessna re-introduced some of its most popular models in the 1990s, the tailwheel equipped Cessna 180 and 185 were not put back into production.

== Design and development ==
The aircraft is basically a Cessna 180 with a strengthened fuselage. The main difference between the two aircraft is the larger vertical fin on the 185 and the 300 hp (224 kW) Continental IO-520-D engine as opposed to the 230 hp (172 kW) Continental O-470-S fitted to the Cessna 180. The exception was that a Continental Motors IO-470-F engine of 260 hp (194 kW) was initially fitted until midway through the 1966 production year. The later model Skywagon II has a factory fitted avionics package.

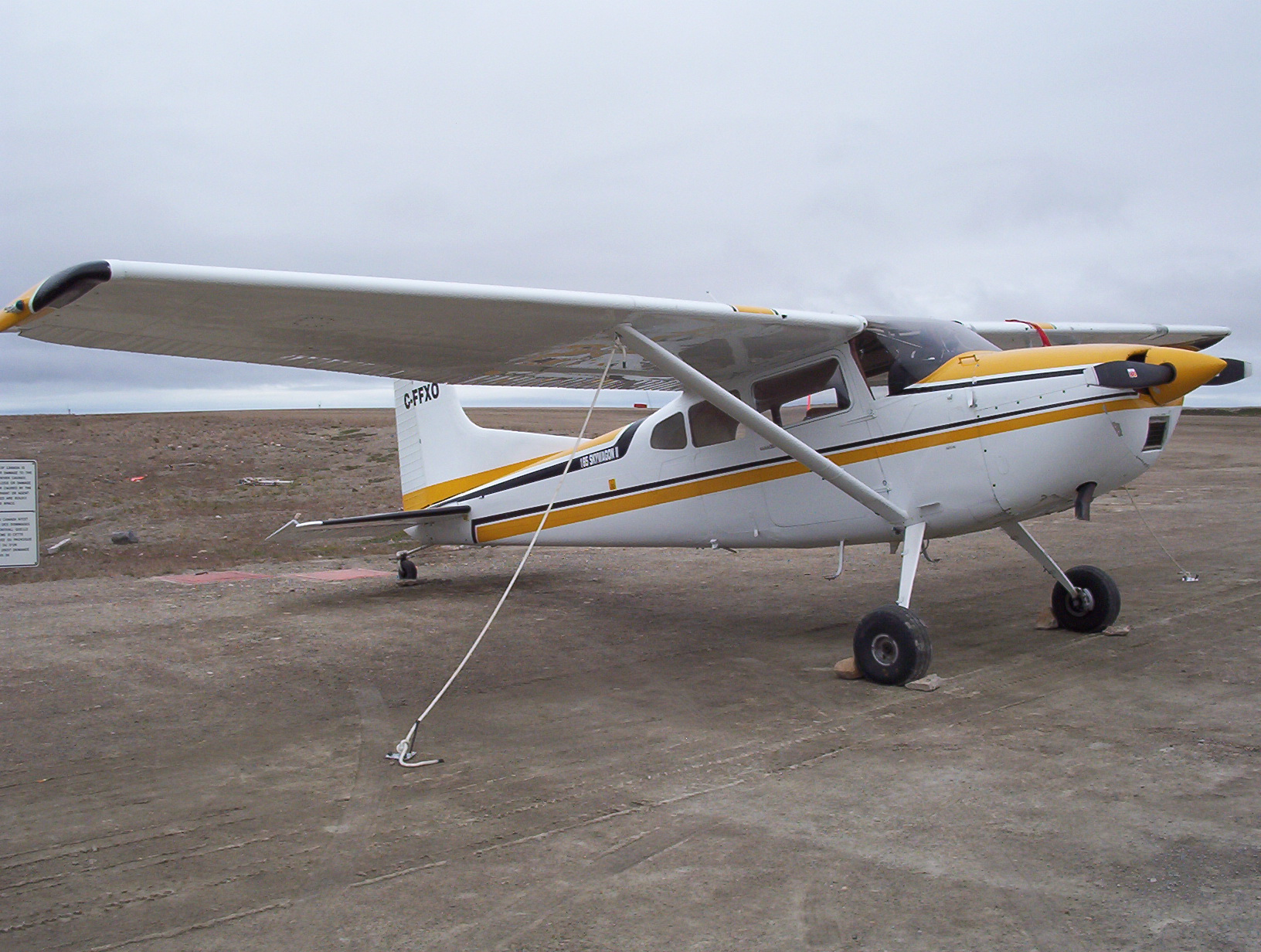
Cessna 185 Skywagon II at Cambridge Bay Airport, Nunavut, Canada

The Skywagon can also be fitted with floats, amphibious floats, or skis. The AgCarryall variant of the 185 adds a 151-gallon belly chemical tank and removable spray booms for aerial application. It is also possible to fit a cargo pod under the fuselage that can carry an extra 300 lb (136 kg).

== Operational history ==
The 180 and 185 are widely used in bush flying, the commercial transport of passengers and freight to rudimentary, remote airstrips, lakes and snowfields, primarily in Canada and Alaska.

== Variants ==
=== Civil variants ===
Cessna has historically used model years similar to U.S. auto manufacturers, with sales of new models typically starting a few months prior to the actual calendar year.

185 Skywagon
1961 model year powered by a 260 hp (194 kW) Continental IO-470-F engine with six seats and a gross weight of 3,200 lb (1,451 kg) as a landplane. Certified on 31 January 1961. 238 built.
185A Skywagon
1962 model year with new wingtips and position lights, two electric auxiliary fuel pumps, and vernier throttle/mixture controls. Certified on 20 September 1961. 275 built.
185B Skywagon
1963 model year with an overhead light console, magnesium rudder pedals, and a single electric auxiliary fuel pump. Certified on 25 June 1962. 141 built.
185C Skywagon
1964 model year with a 52A/12V alternator, a manual tailwheel lock, and dual brake linings. Certified on 19 July 1963. 124 built.
185D Skywagon
1965 model year with open-view control wheels and a redesigned instrument panel with center-mounted instruments and an integrated engine instrument cluster. Certified on 17 June 1964. 191 built.
185E/A185E Skywagon
Introduced for the 1966 model year with an increased gross weight of 3,300 lb (1,497 kg). The A185E was also offered in 1966 with a 300 hp (224 kW) Continental IO-520-D engine and a gross weight of 3,350 lb (1,520 kg). The 185E was discontinued for the 1967 model year, while the A185E received a pointed propeller spinner, individual center passenger seats, a "split-bus" electrical system, and a 60A alternator. 1968 introduced a new automatic induction air system as well as new seat belts, a baggage door, and seat adjustment handles. 1969 introduced optional 300/400-series ARC avionics. 1970 introduces a side-loading door on the left side of the fuselage and conical camber wingtips. An agricultural aircraft version was introduced in 1972 as the AgCarryall with a 151 US gal (572 L) chemical tank, removable 30-nozzle spray booms with a wind-driven spray system, windshield wire cutters, and a cable deflector on the vertical stabilizer. Certified on 24 September 1965. 988 total built; 138 (1966 185E), 45 (1966 A185E), 450 (1967–1969), 347 (1970–1972 Skywagon), and 8 (1972 AgCarryall).
A185F Skywagon
Introduced for the 1973 model year with a "Camber-Lift" wing, dual nose-mounted landing/taxi lights, a redesigned instrument panel with a split-rocker master switch, and padded control wheels. The 1974 model year introduced optional cabin door bubble windows for improved downward visibility. 1976 introduced nylon seating fabric, airspeed indicators in knots, and optional polycarbonate heater outlets. 1977 introduced redesigned control wheels, an improved fuel selector valve, and a strengthened tailwheel. 1978 introduced a 28V electrical system, an avionics master power switch, and the Skywagon II with the preferred options package as standard, including IFR avionics. 1980 introduced a three-bladed propeller, replacing the two-bladed unit on previous model years. Certified on 16 October 1973. 2,272 total built; 196 (1973 Skywagon), 7 (1973 AgCarryall), 225 (1974 Skywagon), 15 (1974 AgCarryall), 211 (1975 Skywagon), 31 (1975 AgCarryall), 279 (1976 Skywagon), 18 (1976 AgCarryall), 288 (1977 Skywagon), 16 (1977 AgCarryall), 218 (1978 Skywagon), 7 (1978 AgCarryall), 255 (1979), 200 (1980), 185 (1981), 70 (1982), 20 (1983), 8 (1984), and 23 (1985).

=== Military variants ===
U-17A
63 185Bs, 34 185Cs, 83 185Ds, 72 185Es, and 13 A185Es acquired by the USAF to supply to a number of countries under the Military Assistance Program.
U-17B
201 A185Es and 10 A185Fs acquired by the USAF to supply to a number of countries under the Military Assistance Program.
U-37
Brazilian Air Force designation for the 185.

== Operators ==
=== Civil operators ===
The Cessna 185 is popular with air charter companies and is operated by private individuals and companies.

=== Military operators ===
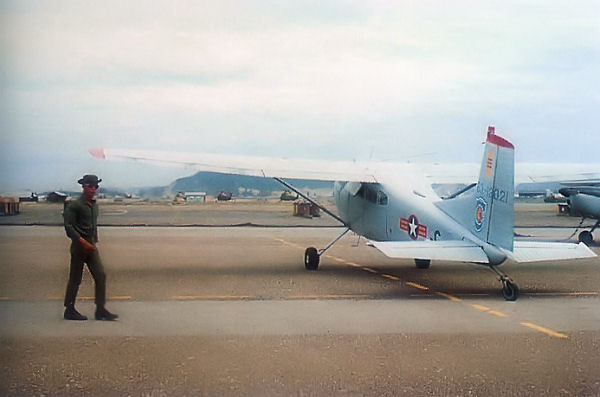
A Cessna U-17A of the Republic of Vietnam Air Force (RVNAF) at Nha Trang Air Base.

As part of the United States Military Assistance Program, Cessna received a contract to supply the United States Air Force with the Skywagon. These were intended for delivery overseas and were designated U-17A and U-17B.

Argentina

- Argentine Army Aviation

Bolivia

- Bolivian Air Force 7 x A185E, 8 x A185F * 5 x U-17A

Costa Rica

- Guardia Civil 3 x U-17A

Ecuador

- Ecuadorian Army 2 x 185D

Greece

- Hellenic Army 9+ x U-17A

Honduras

- Honduran Air Force received a Cessna 185B in 1962, a U-17A in 1963 and a 185D in 1965.

Indonesia

- Indonesian Air Force

Iran

- Islamic Republic of Iran Air Force 185A – no longer in service
- Islamic Revolutionary Army Aviation 185A – no longer in service

Israel

- Israel Air Force 185

Jamaica

- Jamaica Defence Force – 4 x 185 from 1963 to 1985

Laos

- Royal Lao Air Force – U-17s used as reconnaissance and observation aircraft for Nokateng Forward Air Controllers during the Laotian Civil War

Nicaragua

- Nicaraguan Air Force 3 x U-17B

Panama

- Panamanian Public Forces 3 x U-17A

Paraguay

- Paraguayan Air Force 5 x U-17A

Peru

- Peruvian Air Force 9 x 185

Philippines

- Philippine Air Force 8 x U-17A, 9 x U-17B

Portugal

- Portuguese Air Force 5 x 185A operated 1968 to 1974.

Rhodesia

- Rhodesian Air Force – Two civil aircraft impressed into service, about 17 aircraft on loan from the South African Air Force, in service during the 1970s.

El Salvador

- Salvadoran Air Force 1 x 185

South Africa

- South African Air Force 24 x 185A, 12 x 185D, 9 x 185E

South Vietnam

- Republic of Vietnam Air Force – About 100 U-17As and U-17Bs were used by the VNAF. No longer in service.

Thailand

- Royal Thai Army Aviation U-17B
- Royal Thai Navy

Turkey

- Turkish Army Aviation U-17B

Uruguay

- Uruguayan Air Force 12 x U-17A

== Accidents and incidents ==
- On 10 October 1986, a Cessna 185 from Antarctax crashed immediately after leaving Svalbard Airport en route to Ny-Ålesund, killing all six on board.
- On August 14, 1989, a Cessna A185E Skywagon registered N95KW crashed shortly after a balked landing at Coastal Airport, located near Myrtle Grove, Florida. The pilot's seat latch slipped on the railing, causing the pilot to unintentionally stall the aircraft. The pilot and the two passengers on board were all severely injured. The resulting product liability trial, concluding twelve years later, resulted in a $480 million judgment against Cessna. The case was later settled out-of-court for an undisclosed sum. This accident also brought about a series of airworthiness directives that affected all small Cessnas ever built.
- 2001 Peru Cessna 185 shootdown, the aircraft was shot down by a Cessna A-37 Dragonfly of the Peruvian Air Force after being misidentified as a drug plane killing 2 of the 5 occupants on board, this incident lead to the Federal government of the United States temporarily suspending advisement of the governments of Peru and Columbia on shooting down aircraft.
- On August 22, 2025, a Cessna A185F Skywagon with registration number N714HE crashed during an attempted landing at Bangor International Airport in Bangor, Maine. While landing during gusty crosswinds, the plane veered left and into a precision approach path indicator (PAPI) light. The plane then went airborne again before striking the airport's permitter fence. The pilot and only person on board, died in the crash.

== Specifications (1978 Cessna 185 II landplane) ==
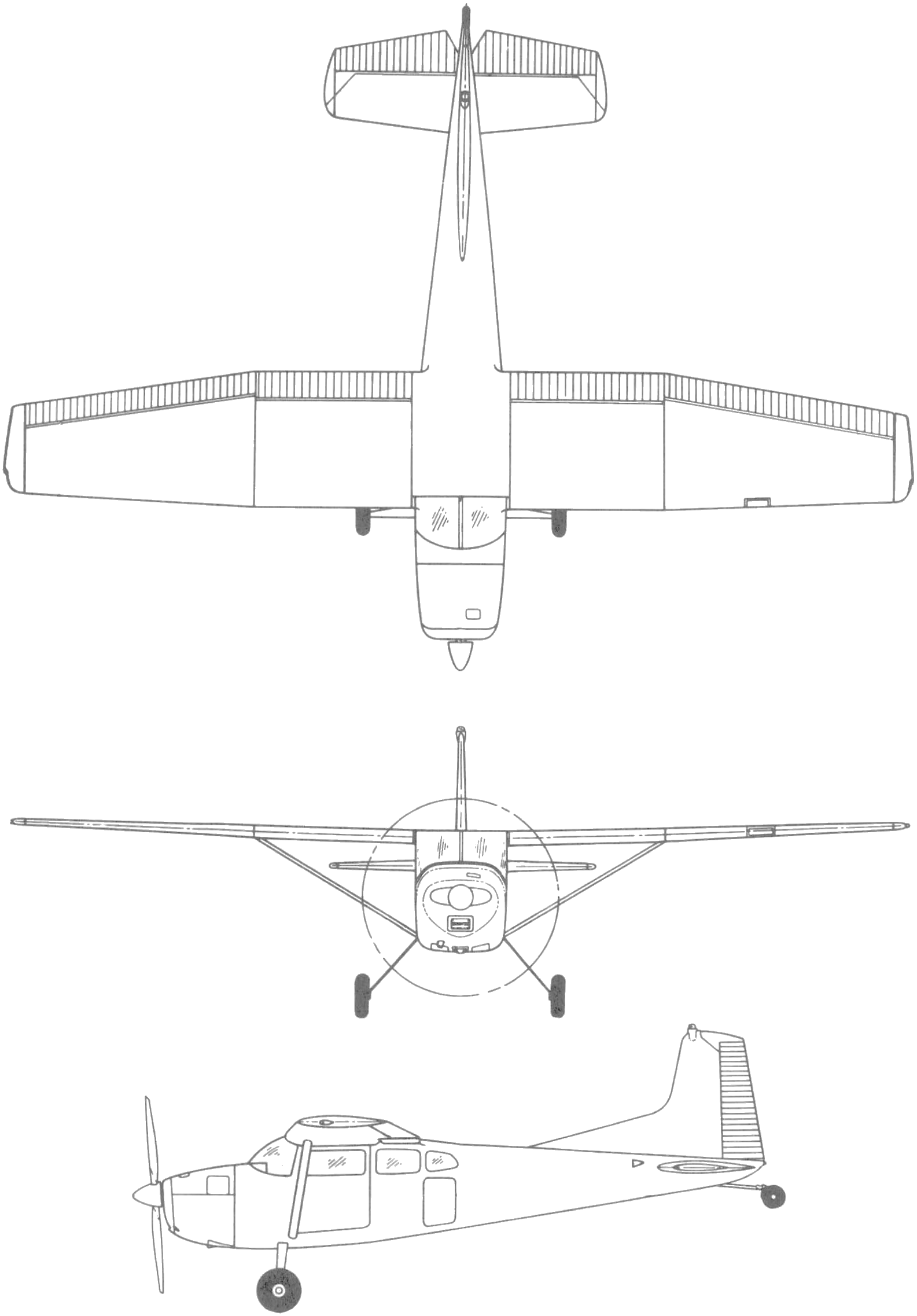
3-view line drawing of the Cessna U-17A

Data from Cessna

General characteristics

- Crew: one
- Capacity: five passengers
- Length: 25 ft 9 in (7.85 m)
- Wingspan: 35 ft 10 in (10.92 m)
- Height: 7 ft 9 in (2.36 m)
- Wing area: 174 sq ft (16.2 m^{2})
- Empty weight: 1,748 lb (793 kg)
- Gross weight: 3,350 lb (1,520 kg)
- Powerplant: 1 × Continental IO-520-D , 300 hp (220 kW)
- Propellers: 2-bladed constant speed, 6 ft 10 in (2.08 m) diameter

Performance

- Maximum speed: 155 kn (178 mph, 287 km/h)
- Cruise speed: 145 kn (167 mph, 269 km/h)
- Stall speed: 49 kn (56 mph, 91 km/h)
- Range: 720 nmi (830 mi, 1,330 km)
- Service ceiling: 17,150 ft (5,230 m)
- Rate of climb: 1,010 ft/min (5.1 m/s)
- Wing loading: 19.3 lb/sq ft (94 kg/m^{2})

=== Specification for differing configurations ===
	Landplane	Floatplane	Amphibian
Length		27 ft 0 in (8.23 m)	27 ft 6 in (8.38 m)
Height		12 ft 2 in (3.71 m)	12 ft 8 in (3.86 m)
Empty weight	1,745 lb (792 kg)	1,910 lb (866 kg)	2,165 lb (982 kg)
MTOW		3,320 lb (1,506 kg)	3,265 lb (1,481 kg) on land 3,100 lb (1,406 kg) on water
Max. speed	136 knots (252 km/h)	141 knots (261 km/h)	135 knots (251 km/h)
Range	516 nm (957 km)	503 nm (933 km)	482 nm (893 km)
Service ceiling		16,400 ft (5,000 m)	15,300 ft (4,700 m)
Rate of climb		960 ft/min (293 m/min)	970 ft/min (296 m/min)
Wing loading		19.1 lb/ft^{2} (93.3 kg/m^{2})	18.8 lb/ft^{2} (91.8 kg/m^{2})

== See also ==
Related development

- Cessna 180
