= List of United States tornadoes from April to May 2023 =

United States tornadoes from April to May 2023
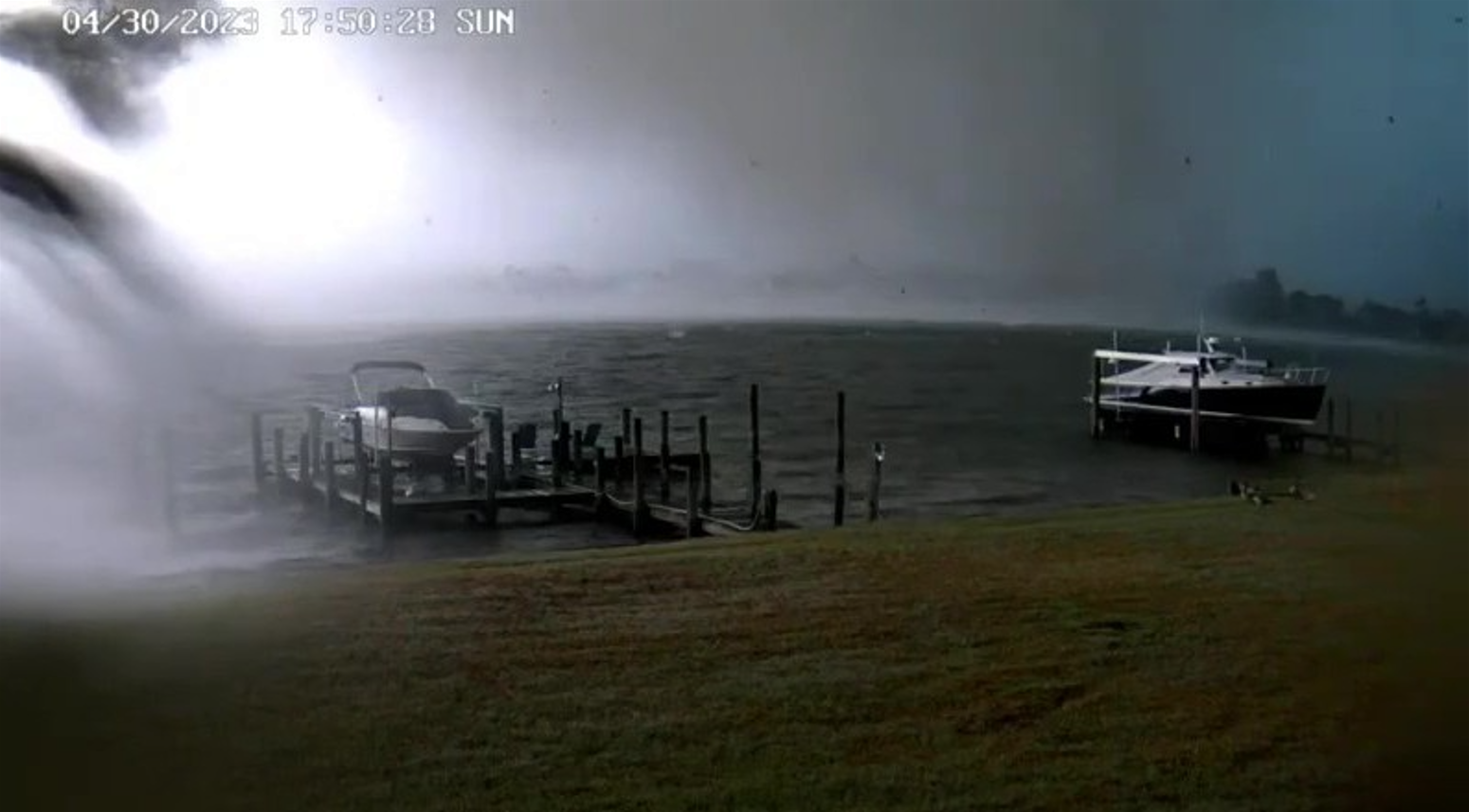
- An EF3 tornado near Virginia Beach, Virginia on April 30
- Timespan: April 1 – May 31
- Maximum rated tornado: EF3 tornado: Fairview, Alabama on April 1; Bridgeville, Delaware on April 1; Lewistown–Bryant, Illinois on April 4; Cole, Oklahoma on April 19; Pink, Oklahoma on April 19; Virginia Beach, Virginia on April 30
- Tornadoes: 338
- Fatalities: 10
- Injuries: 57

This page documents all tornadoes confirmed by various weather forecast offices of the National Weather Service in the United States from April to May 2023. Tornado counts are considered preliminary until final publication in the database of the National Centers for Environmental Information. Based on the 1991–2020 average, about 155 tornadoes occur in the United States in April, while 276 tornadoes occur in May. Activity also tends to spread northward and westward in April compared to the cooler winter months and the Midwest and Great Plains tend to see increased activity, although the relative maxima remains in the southern states. The shift northward and westward continues into May, as the maxima moves into the Midwest and the Great Plains as the springtime jet stream patterns tend to occur farther north (while the South begins to see decreasing activity), while the potential for tornadic activity also increases in the Northeastern United States.

Overall, April saw near average levels of activity in the United States with 162 tornadoes being confirmed. The start of the month saw very active tornadic activity, with over 60 tornadoes during the first five days of the month, with the first coming as the second day of an outbreak that began on March 31. However, moisture return became more limited after that, and tornadic activity went dormant for a few days. Some severe weather outbreaks did occur at the start of the middle of the month, but these outbreaks mainly produced very large hail or damaging winds instead of tornadoes and most of the tornadoes were weak. However, more consistent scattered to widespread tornadic activity began in the second part of the month, which included a moderate-sized outbreak between April 19–20. On the other hand, the tornado count for May was significantly below average with 190 tornadoes, most of which were weak. May featured steady activity throughout the month (and no major outbreaks) with only a brief period of enhanced activity towards the middle part of the month. It was the fourth and final straight year that no violent tornadoes touched down in May as well as the second time in three years that no EF3+ tornadoes were confirmed.

== April ==
Confirmed tornadoes by Enhanced Fujita rating
| EFU | EF0 | EF1 | EF2 | EF3 | EF4 | EF5 | Total |
|---|---|---|---|---|---|---|---|
| 15 | 62 | 58 | 19 | 6 | 0 | 0 | 160 |

=== April 1 event ===
List of confirmed tornadoes – Saturday, April 1, 2023 (Note: All dates are based on the local time zone where the tornado touched down; however, all times are in Coordinated Universal Time for consistency.)
| EF# | Location | County / parish | State | Start coord. | Time (UTC) | Path length | Max. width |
|---|---|---|---|---|---|---|---|
| EF0 | N of Laura to Northern Troy | Miami | OH | 40.0241°N 84.4078°W | 05:01–05:14 | 12.78 mi (20.57 km) | 250 yd (230 m) |
| EF0 | This tornado first significantly damaged a couple of barns and garages, while some tree damage occurred as well. The tornado moved through the north side of Troy before it dissipated, damaging the roofs of several homes and causing tree damage. A building at the Miami County Fairgrounds had part of its metal roof peeled back as well. | | | | | | |
| EF0 | N of Pleasant Hill | Miami | OH | 40.0704°N 84.3905°W | 05:02–05:06 | 4 mi (6.4 km) | 250 yd (230 m) |
| EF0 | A weak tornado damaged a few barns and downed some trees. | | | | | | |
| EF0 | WNW of Lafayette | Allen | OH | 40.7593°N 83.9851°W | 05:02–05:06 | 0.78 mi (1.26 km) | 75 yd (69 m) |
| EF0 | Two barns were destroyed and several trees were downed. | | | | | | |
| EF0 | SW of Potsdam to Western West Milton | Darke, Miami | OH | 39.9486°N 84.4491°W | 05:02–05:08 | 5.92 mi (9.53 km) | 200 yd (180 m) |
| EF0 | Damage to trees and some barns occurred. The tornado entered West Milton at the end of its path, causing some minor tree damage in the western part of town before dissipating. | | | | | | |
| EF0 | E of South Warsaw to SSW of Westminster | Allen | OH | 40.6594°N 84.0036°W | 05:03–05:04 | 0.62 mi (1.00 km) | 50 yd (46 m) |
| EF0 | A house sustained minor damage and several trees were snapped or uprooted. A grain bin was destroyed and tossed about 0.5 mi (0.80 km) as well. | | | | | | |
| EF0 | SSW of Westminster | Allen | OH | 40.6579°N 83.9895°W | 05:04–05:05 | 0.23 mi (0.37 km) | 50 yd (46 m) |
| EF0 | A barn was heavily damaged and its debris was thrown into nearby fields. | | | | | | |
| EF2 | NNE of Ellistown to SE of Baldwyn | Union, Lee | MS | 34.463°N 88.8316°W | 05:46–05:59 | 14.72 mi (23.69 km) | 750 yd (690 m) |
| EF2 | This strong tornado moved through areas between Guntown and Baldwyn. Several houses had their roofs and exterior walls removed, other homes sustained more minor damage, and a large two-story garage was swept away. Mobile homes and campers were also destroyed, with one mobile home being swept away as well. Two churches, a shop building, and a large sign were damaged, and many trees were snapped or uprooted along the path. | | | | | | |
| EF2 | NNW of Randolph to E of Pontotoc | Pontotoc | MS | 34.189°N 89.223°W | 05:52–06:21 | 22.84 mi (36.76 km) | 475 yd (434 m) |
| EF2 | 1 death – This tornado developed north-northwest of Randolph and moved eastward, damaging several homes and outbuildings and downing trees, one of which fell on and damaged the front side of a home. Roof damage to homes continued as the tornado approached Pontotoc, with one home having part of its roof removed. The tornado reached its peak intensity as it struck the southern outskirts of Pontotoc, where a double-wide mobile home was obliterated and swept away, several homes had large portions of their roofs removed, and a large anchored garage was leveled. Other homes and a butcher shop in the area had less severe roof damage, and many trees were snapped. Moving eastward, the tornado continued to snap or uproot trees, and inflicted varying degrees of roof damage to multiple homes. One home lost part of its roof and had its attached garage destroyed, and an adjacent unanchored double-wide mobile home was swept away and destroyed, killing the occupant. Continuing eastward, the tornado inflicted roof damage to more homes, rolled and destroyed a small barber shop building, and snapped or uprooted numerous trees. Some of the trees landed on homes, causing structural damage. A church sign and cemetery sign were blown down, and several headstones in the cemetery were damaged before the tornado dissipated. In all, roughly 75 to 100 structures were impacted by the tornado. | | | | | | |
| EF1 | E of Hartsville to SE of Lafayette | Trousdale, Macon | TN | 36.4204°N 86.0464°W | 05:53–05:58 | 6.2 mi (10.0 km) | 125 yd (114 m) |
| EF1 | Several outbuildings were damaged or destroyed, while homes suffered siding and roof damage, including some that had portions of their roofs removed. Trees were snapped or uprooted, and one home was also damaged by a falling tree limb. A propane tank was flipped, causing a family at that residence to temporarily evacuate. | | | | | | |
| EF0 | WSW of Lykens | Crawford | OH | 40.9597°N 83.0709°W | 05:47–05:50 | 2.85 mi (4.59 km) | 200 yd (180 m) |
| EF0 | A high-end EF0 tornado damaged the roof of a barn and damaged and moved a large dairy barn. A silo was blown onto the Wheeling and Lake Erie Railway line, causing a westward-moving train to collide into it. A two-car garage was damaged, a concrete block was blown up into a tree, and several 2x4s were impaled into the ground and the roof of a home. | | | | | | |
| EF1 | WNW of Chapel Hill to E of Eagleville | Marshall, Bedford, Rutherford | TN | 35.6642°N 86.753°W | 06:16–06:31 | 12.93 mi (20.81 km) | 150 yd (140 m) |
| EF1 | This high-end EF1 tornado downed many trees and caused various degrees of roof, window, and siding damage to multiple homes. One older house had a second story exterior wall blown out, and another home had a large portion of its roof torn off. Along US 31A/SR 11 in Holts Corner, five train cars on the CSX S&NA North Subdivision were derailed. A couple of outbuildings were damaged as well. | | | | | | |
| EF1 | Southern Tupelo | Lee | MS | 34.2327°N 88.7226°W | 06:28–06:31 | 2.11 mi (3.40 km) | 375 yd (343 m) |
| EF1 | This high-end EF1 tornado caused considerable damage as it moved through the south side of Tupelo. Several homes sustained roof damage, vehicles were damaged, a fence was blown over, and trees were downed. A warehouse building was mostly collapsed, and nearby-semi trailers were moved, one of which was flipped. Large industrial buildings at the Cooper Tire & Rubber Company plant sustained significant roof loss, and debris from the facility was scattered over several miles to the east. A small outbuilding structure was destroyed, and a business had its windows blown out. | | | | | | |
| EF0 | Golden | Tishomingo | MS | 34.4851°N 88.1953°W | 06:30–06:32 | 1.39 mi (2.24 km) | 80 yd (73 m) |
| EF0 | A brief high-end EF0 tornado moved through Golden, initially causing minor damage with small tree limbs broken and a power line brought down. The most significant damage occurred shortly afterward, where a towing service building was knocked down, a shed was flipped, and the framing of a house under construction collapsed. Farther along the path, another shed was destroyed and additional power lines were downed. Numerous trees were uprooted across the affected area, with tree damage continuing until the tornado dissipated near the banks of Bear Creek. | | | | | | |
| EF2 | S of Murfreesboro to Readyville to N of Woodbury | Rutherford, Cannon | TN | 35.7554°N 86.3814°W | 06:41–06:59 | 18.45 mi (29.69 km) | 500 yd (460 m) |
| EF2 | Several homes near Murfreesboro sustained mostly minor damage, though one house sustained roof loss and a very old abandoned house was destroyed. A billboard and multiple trees were blown down, and a few outbuildings were damaged. The tornado then intensified and struck Readyville at high-end EF2 strength, causing major damage. The Readyville Mill, post office, a market, and a few other businesses were destroyed, and the historic Charles Ready House was heavily damaged and had its entire roof torn off. Many homes in town were severely damaged or destroyed, including a couple of poorly anchored homes that were pushed off their foundations, one of which collapsed. Other homes had their roofs and exterior walls torn off, while an outdoor wedding venue, barns, and detached garages were completely destroyed. Cars were overturned, and many large trees were snapped or uprooted in town. The tornado weakened as it moved away from Readyville, blowing down numerous trees and inflicting minor damage to homes before dissipating. Two people were injured. | | | | | | |
| EF1 | SSW of Hackleburg to Southern Bear Creek to NE of Haleyville | Marion, Winston | AL | 34.238°N 87.851°W | 07:32–07:52 | 16.98 mi (27.33 km) | 675 yd (617 m) |
| EF1 | A high-end EF1 tornado first touched down near Hackleburg before striking the rural community of Fairview and surrounding areas, snapping or uprooting many trees. A mobile home was destroyed, while frame homes and outbuildings sustained minor damage. As the tornado moved through the southern outskirts of Bear Creek, a furniture factory housed in a large metal warehouse building was heavily damaged. Significant tree damage occurred, an outbuilding structure was destroyed, and a mobile home was flipped upside-down, severely injuring the occupant. The tornado continued through rural areas to the east of Bear Creek before dissipating, where multiple homes were damaged by falling trees or the tornado itself, and a detached garage was destroyed. | | | | | | |
| EF3 | N of Hazel Green, AL to SSW of Elora, TN | Madison (AL), Lincoln (TN) | AL, TN | 34.9746°N 86.5738°W | 08:09–08:25 | 12.03 mi (19.36 km) | 215 yd (197 m) |
| EF3 | 1 death – This intense tornado touched down in the Fisk community and quickly strengthened to mid-range EF3 intensity. A few businesses had their roofs removed and exterior walls knocked down, and a box truck was thrown against a utility pole. A couple of homes sustained less severe damage and trees were downed as well. Continuing east-northeastward, the tornado badly damaged a house, inflicted roof and window damage to other homes, destroyed outbuildings, and snapped or uprooted many trees. It then reached its peak intensity of high-end EF3 as it moved along the Alabama-Tennessee state line. Multiple homes were heavily damaged or destroyed, including a few that were completely leveled, with a fatality occurring in one of the homes. Other homes suffered roof damage, power poles were snapped, and a mobile home was obliterated and swept away. A large metal outbuilding and multiple barns were destroyed, and wooden fence posts anchored in concrete were pulled out of the ground. The tornado weakened after crossing into Tennessee, where several outbuildings housing farm equipment were destroyed, and trees were sporadically snapped and uprooted before the tornado dissipated south of Elora. Five people were injured. | | | | | | |
| EF1 | Sunbright | Morgan | TN | 36.243°N 84.68°W | 08:10–08:15 | 1.44 mi (2.32 km) | 60 yd (55 m) |
| EF1 | A tornado touched down west of Sunbright, downing numerous large trees and causing minor roof damage to nearby homes. It tracked northeast and crossed US 27, continuing to produce structural and tree damage. The tornado damaged Sunbright City Hall and then caused significant roof damage to two homes, with many trees snapped or uprooted nearby. Near the end of its path, more damage was observed where another house sustained substantial damage before the tornado lifted. | | | | | | |
| EF0 | Northern Sardis City | Etowah | AL | 34.181°N 86.149°W | 09:51–09:55 | 3.1 mi (5.0 km) | 250 yd (230 m) |
| EF0 | A shop had large doors blown out, a church had a portion of its roof ripped off, and several homes in town sustained significant roof damage as a result of this high-end EF0 tornado. One home in particular experienced failure of its west-facing garage door, causing the roof to be ripped off and walls to collapse. Sheds were damaged or destroyed, while fencing and a silo were damaged. Numerous trees were snapped or uprooted, some of which fell on and caused significant damage to site-built homes and manufactured homes. Two people in a manufactured home were injured. | | | | | | |
| EF0 | Northern Woodstock | Cherokee | GA | 34.1245°N 84.5357°W | 11:35–11:38 | 2.49 mi (4.01 km) | 75 yd (69 m) |
| EF0 | This tornado touched down along the northern edge of a residential area, snapping a few trees before moving east through wooded terrain where additional trees were broken. As it crossed I-575, a vehicle was reportedly spun, its hood blown back into the windshield, and multiple street signs and small trees were knocked down along the interstate. Continuing east, the tornado primarily caused tree damage before entering the South Cherokee Recreational complex, where it blew the roof off a dugout, overturned bleachers, and toppled a press box. The tornado then weakened and lifted shortly thereafter. | | | | | | |
| EF0 | Dundee | Monroe | MI | 41.946°N 83.711°W | 15:03–15:08 | 7.12 mi (11.46 km) | 75 yd (69 m) |
| EF0 | A weak tornado moved through downtown Dundee, where buildings had roofing material blown off with debris strewn across streets. Windows were broken, tree limbs were downed, and cars were also damaged. Homes sustained roof shingle damage, and an outbuilding was damaged outside of town as well. | | | | | | |
| EF3 | NW of Bridgeville to Ellendale | Sussex | DE | 38.757°N 75.6398°W | 21:59–22:19 | 14.3 mi (23.0 km) | 700 yd (640 m) |
| EF3 | 1 death – This intense tornado touched down northwest of Bridgeville and moved east-northeast, crossing DE 404. Outbuildings at several farmsteads were damaged, a ham radio antennae was knocked over behind a house, power poles were snapped, and trees were downed, one of which landed on a house and caused roof damage. Semi-trailers were overturned, and an unanchored home was pushed off its foundation and collapsed with debris scattered for hundreds of yards. The tornado reached its maximum strength as it impacted a DelDOT facility, where two large steel high-tension power poles were bent to the ground, and at least six wooden high-tension poles were snapped. This damage garnered a low-end EF3 rating. A large metal garage structure at the facility sustained partial collapse of an exterior wall and lost much of its roof, a salt storage building had its roof destroyed, and some other buildings on the property were also damaged. The tornado then crossed US 13 and continued to the east-northeast, flattening two poorly anchored homes and causing a fatality. A few other homes had large portions of their roofs and exterior walls torn off, while numerous additional residences along this segment of the path were damaged to a lesser extent. Outbuildings, chicken houses, barns and garages were destroyed, pivot irrigation sprinklers were flipped, and many trees and power poles were snapped as well. The tornado then weakened as it crossed US 113 and entered Ellendale, where homes had their roofs damaged and one residence had its attached garage destroyed. A free-standing garage and an automotive repair business had roofing blown off, and tree damage occurred in town as well. The tornado weakened further as it exited Ellendale, causing some additional minor tree damage and overturning a pivot irrigation sprinkler before dissipating. This tornado was the largest ever recorded in Delaware and is tied as the strongest in state history, alongside an F3 tornado on April 28, 1961. Furthermore, it was the second fatal tornado in Delaware history, with the other occurring on July 21, 1983. | | | | | | |
| EF1 | Calvert to N of North East | Cecil | MD | 39.7°N 76.01°W | 22:35–23:41 | 5.49 mi (8.84 km) | 125 yd (114 m) |
| EF1 | This tornado first struck the Plumpton Park Zoo, where a metal door was damaged at a giraffe enclosure. Portable toilets at Calvert Regional Park were thrown more than 300 yards (270 m) and completely destroyed. A small barn was pushed about 50 yd (46 m) into a field and collapsed, fencing was damaged, and a sign was torn off the Cecil Arena. Multiple homes and businesses sustained minor structural damage, including to their fencing, shingles, fascia, soffits, and siding. Well over one hundred trees were snapped or uprooted along the path, and four wooden power poles were snapped as well. | | | | | | |
| EF1 | S of Wrightstown to Newtown | Bucks | PA | 40.2486°N 74.9914°W | 22:46–22:50 | 3.9 mi (6.3 km) | 200 yd (180 m) |
| EF1 | This QLCS tornado developed and initially uprooted and snapped several trees. As it progressed southeast, the tornado caused additional tree damage in residential areas and across the Bucks County Community College campus. The strongest damage was observed on the north side of Newtown, where part of a strip mall sustained failure of a roof façade, indicating the peak winds along the path. Farther east, tree damage continued through downtown Newtown before the continuous damage path ended near the Newtown Cemetery. | | | | | | |
| EF1 | Cinnaminson to Eastern Moorestown | Burlington | NJ | 40.0065°N 75.0006°W | 22:59–23:03 | 6 mi (9.7 km) | 600 yd (550 m) |
| EF1 | A tornado touched down in Cinnaminson, producing initial damage marked by snapped and uprooted trees before tracking east-southeast through residential areas. The damage path quickly widened, with numerous trees downed across neighborhoods near local schools. The strongest damage occurred where a single-family home lost most of its roof covering. The tornado then crossed US 130 and entered a cemetery, where a broad swath of softwood trees were uprooted or snapped at the trunks. Continuing east-southeast, the tornado moved through additional neighborhoods and parkland, maintaining a wide tree-damage swath. The damage path became difficult to trace through a wooded preserve, but minor tree and limb damage reappeared farther east. More concentrated tree damage was observed again as the tornado weakened, with trees leaning onto utility lines and minor siding and shingle damage to homes. The tornado finally dissipated after snapping the top of a utility pole, with damage becoming increasingly narrow and sporadic toward the end of its path. | | | | | | |
| EF1 | Crosswicks to SSW of Allentown | Burlington, Mercer, Monmouth | NJ | 40.1525°N 74.6461°W | 23:08–23:11 | 2.8 mi (4.5 km) | 300 yd (270 m) |
| EF1 | A tornado developed in the Crosswicks and produced damage that was largely confined to trees, with numerous trees uprooted or snapped within and just east of the village. As it moved east, fairly significant tree damage continued on residential properties before the tornado entered an inaccessible wooded area along a creek and crossed into Mercer County. The circulation later reemerged near a recreation facility, where additional trees were uprooted along a tree line. The tornado weakened and dissipated in an open field a few minutes later after crossing into Upper Freehold Township, with no further damage observed beyond that point. | | | | | | |
| EF1 | SSE of Allentown to Northern Cream Ridge | Monmouth | NJ | 40.1541°N 74.5715°W | 23:14–23:17 | 4 mi (6.4 km) | 550 yd (500 m) |
| EF1 | This high-end EF1 tornado developed west of a residential neighborhood and quickly caused its most significant damage as it entered the community. Numerous trees were snapped or uprooted, and several homes sustained roof shingle loss, siding damage, blown-out windows, and a few failed garage doors. An irrigation pivot was overturned and blown into fencing and nearby yards, and another pivot was later toppled as the tornado moved east across open farmland. Continuing eastward, the tornado caused additional tree damage, including snapped trunks and uprooted trees, and left a wooden power pole leaning in the direction of motion. Road signs were blown down at a nearby traffic circle, and damage remained mainly tree-related as the tornado crossed more fields. The tornado then entered another wooded residential area where the circulation widened again, snapping and uprooting numerous trees, including one that fell onto power lines. After producing additional tree damage near another neighborhood, the tornado weakened and dissipated in an open field. | | | | | | |
| EF2 | SE of Holmeson to W of Jackson Mills | Ocean | NJ | 40.1555°N 74.3937°W | 23:24–23:27 | 2.1 mi (3.4 km) | 200 yd (180 m) |
| EF2 | A significant, high-end EF2 tornado touched down in Jackson Township and moved east, snapping and uprooting dozens of large hardwood and softwood trees in a convergent pattern. Along this portion of the track, power poles were downed, fences were demolished, and sheds, small outbuildings, and dumpsters were flipped or displaced, while homes generally sustained only minor siding and shingle damage. The tornado then intensified as it crossed a cleared area and struck a large warehouse complex, where multiple three-story concrete tilt-up walls collapsed eastward and extensive debris was generated. Numerous trees around the warehouse and adjacent parking areas were snapped or uprooted, lying predominantly east to northeast. Continuing east-southeast, the tornado produced its most extensive tree and powerline damage, with hundreds of mature trees downed and additional power poles snapped, along with roofing and insulation debris scattered from the warehouse. As it entered a residential area farther east, the tornado weakened, the damage path narrowed, and impacts were limited to scattered tree damage and minor roof and siding damage before the tornado dissipated. | | | | | | |
| EF2 | Jackson Township to Howell Township | Ocean, Monmouth | NJ | 40.1543°N 74.2735°W | 23:33–23:34 | 1.59 mi (2.56 km) | 150 yd (140 m) |
| EF2 | This strong tornado touched down within a wooded residential area, immediately producing a swath of snapped and uprooted hardwood and softwood trees in a convergent pattern. Numerous fences were demolished, sheds were flipped or displaced, and power poles were downed as the tornado moved east-southeast through neighborhoods, while homes generally sustained minor siding and shingle damage during this phase. The tornado later intensified, causing more concentrated tree damage and moderate exterior damage to several houses, including gutters, decks, awnings, and roofing. At its peak, the tornado completely lifted the roof from one home and hurled large debris, including roof rafters, more than 100 yd (91 m) into nearby houses, with insulation and siding scattered across the area. The tornado quickly weakened and dissipated shortly thereafter. | | | | | | |
| EF2 | Sea Girt | Monmouth | NJ | 40.1223°N 74.0398°W | 23:42–23:44 | 0.14 mi (0.23 km) | 50 yd (46 m) |
| EF2 | A strong tornado likely formed over Stockton Lake and moved east-southeast across the New Jersey Youth Challenge Academy, where it caused its most significant damage. A large section of a wood-framed, shingled roof was completely torn from an academy building and thrown east-northeast, with debris scattered for roughly 250 yd (230 m) in a curved, tapering pattern. An additional tree was uprooted and laid down in the same general direction. The tornado weakened and lifted as it moved across a parking lot and adjacent open grass fields. | | | | | | |
| EF1 | Mays Landing | Atlantic | NJ | 39.4738°N 74.8579°W | 23:42–23:43 | 0.9 mi (1.4 km) | 110 yd (100 m) |
| EF1 | This tornado touched down just south of US 40 in a heavily forested area, snapping large branches and damaging trees. As it moved east into Mays Landing, it reached peak intensity by partially lifting the roof from a single-family home, with numerous trees on the property suffering broken limbs and uprooting nearby. Continuing eastward, the tornado produced extensive tree damage, including snapped trunks and uprooted trees concentrated along one side of its path. The damage gradually diminished as the tornado moved into a dense forested area, where it ultimately lifted. | | | | | | |

=== April 2 event ===
List of confirmed tornadoes – Sunday, April 2, 2023
| EF# | Location | County / parish | State | Start coord. | Time (UTC) | Path length | Max. width |
|---|---|---|---|---|---|---|---|
| EFU | WSW of Stranger | Falls | TX | 31.315°N 96.76°W | 22:15–22:18 | 0.95 mi (1.53 km) | 25 yd (23 m) |
| EFU | A narrow tornado traversed open fields. | | | | | | |
| EF0 | NNE of Kosse | Limestone | TX | 31.3458°N 96.6184°W | 22:36–22:38 | 0.38 mi (0.61 km) | 33 yd (30 m) |
| EF0 | This rope tornado caused tree damage along SH 14. | | | | | | |
| EFU | SE of Thornton to W of Oletha | Limestone | TX | 31.373°N 96.491°W | 22:43–22:45 | 1.2 mi (1.9 km) | 33 yd (30 m) |
| EFU | A brief tornado crossed FM 1246. | | | | | | |
| EF0 | NE of Oletha | Limestone | TX | 31.3981°N 96.3595°W | 23:00–23:02 | 0.7 mi (1.1 km) | 33 yd (30 m) |
| EF0 | Some tree limbs were snapped. | | | | | | |

=== April 3 event ===
List of confirmed tornadoes – Monday, April 3, 2023
| EF# | Location | County / parish | State | Start coord. | Time (UTC) | Path length | Max. width |
|---|---|---|---|---|---|---|---|
| EF1 | S of Mendenhall | Simpson | MS | 31.9177°N 89.8915°W | 09:37–09:46 | 4.54 mi (7.31 km) | 430 yd (390 m) |
| EF1 | This tornado touched down southwest of Mendenhall and crossed MS 13, where multiple trees were snapped and uprooted. It continued northeast through rural areas, causing ongoing tree damage with uprooted trees and broken branches along its path. The tornado crossed US 49 before weakening and dissipating shortly thereafter, with tree damage remaining the primary impact throughout its track. | | | | | | |
| EF1 | SE of Moss | Jones | MS | 31.8063°N 89.146°W | 10:45–10:51 | 3.48 mi (5.60 km) | 220 yd (200 m) |
| EF1 | A tornado touched down and traveled generally east-southeast, producing widespread tree damage along its path. Numerous trees were uprooted and large branches were snapped as the tornado moved through rural areas. Farther along the track, additional large limbs were broken before the tornado caused minor structural damage near the end of its path, including roof, awning, and siding damage to a home. The tornado then weakened and dissipated shortly thereafter. | | | | | | |
| EF0 | Northern Enterprise | Coffee | AL | 31.3592°N 85.8293°W | 15:36–15:38 | 0.27 mi (0.43 km) | 50 yd (46 m) |
| EF0 | A brief tornado touched down at the Enterprise Country Club in northern Enterprise, causing localized damage near the clubhouse. The roof and porch overhang of the clubhouse were damaged, with roofing debris scattered downwind across the golf course. Additional damage included snapped or damaged trees along the short path. The tornado weakened and dissipated before leaving the golf course property. | | | | | | |
| EF1 | Northwestern Dothan | Houston | AL | 31.248°N 85.4516°W | 16:13–16:15 | 1.6 mi (2.6 km) | 105 yd (96 m) |
| EF1 | A brief tornado touched down in northwest Dothan and moved southeast before lifting shortly afterward. A concentrated path of tree damage was noted, with numerous trees snapped and uprooted along its track. The most intense damage occurred within a small residential area where tree loss was densest, while damage elsewhere was more scattered. No significant structural damage was reported beyond impacts from falling trees. | | | | | | |
| EF1 | ESE of Bainbridge | Decatur | GA | 30.8719°N 84.5112°W | 17:40–17:42 | 1.38 mi (2.22 km) | 150 yd (140 m) |
| EF1 | Tree damage occurred. | | | | | | |
| EF1 | NW of Climax | Decatur | GA | 30.8838°N 84.4398°W | 17:48–17:49 | 0.37 mi (0.60 km) | 250 yd (230 m) |
| EF1 | This tornado developed near rural areas north of Climax, damaging a farm before crossing open fields and dissipating shortly afterward. Along its short path, numerous trees were damaged or destroyed. A farm equipment storage building sustained significant damage, including the removal of very heavy concrete footings from the ground. | | | | | | |

=== April 4 event ===
List of confirmed tornadoes – Tuesday, April 4, 2023
| EF# | Location | County / parish | State | Start coord. | Time (UTC) | Path length | Max. width |
|---|---|---|---|---|---|---|---|
| EF1 | W of Milan | Rock Island | IL | 41.44°N 90.66°W | 14:36–14:37 | 1.09 mi (1.75 km) | 25 yd (23 m) |
| EF1 | Sporadic damage to power poles, trees, and houses occurred. | | | | | | |
| EF1 | Rock Island | Rock Island | IL | 41.48°N 90.58°W | 14:41–14:43 | 1.59 mi (2.56 km) | 150 yd (140 m) |
| EF1 | This tornado knocked over and snapped large trees and produced minor damage to several roofs. | | | | | | |
| EF1 | Southern Moline | Rock Island | IL | 41.48°N 90.51°W | 14:47–14:49 | 1.62 mi (2.61 km) | 25 yd (23 m) |
| EF1 | Trees were downed and roofs were damaged. | | | | | | |
| EF2 | Northern Colona | Henry | IL | 41.48°N 90.37°W | 14:57–14:58 | 0.52 mi (0.84 km) | 50 yd (46 m) |
| EF2 | This low-end EF2 tornado moved through the northern portion of Colona, producing a concentrated corridor of damage within a broader area of straight-line winds. The most severe damage occurred at a gas station, where the entire roof was torn off and hurled into a nearby brick building, causing the collapse of its front wall. Elsewhere along the path, trees were uprooted and minor damage was inflicted on nearby homes before the tornado dissipated. | | | | | | |
| EF2 | SE of Geneseo | Henry | IL | 41.43°N 90.12°W | 15:15–15:19 | 2.79 mi (4.49 km) | 600 yd (550 m) |
| EF2 | A strong, multi-vortex tornado developed just outside of Geneseo, producing intermittent but sometimes significant damage along its path. Numerous trees were uprooted or snapped, often falling in varying directions. Several farm buildings, silos, and houses were damaged, with most homes experiencing shingle uplift. Near the end of the track, the tornado briefly intensified, snapping a power pole, destroying four farm outbuildings, and lifting the roof of a house before it settled back onto the structure as the tornado occluded and dissipated. | | | | | | |
| EF1 | E of Liberty Center to SSE of Pleasantville | Warren, Marion | IA | 41.1986°N 93.4558°W | 23:43–00:06 | 15.32 mi (24.66 km) | 130 yd (120 m) |
| EF1 | A high-end EF1 tornado touched down and tracked northeast. Along its track, several homes, outbuildings, and pieces of farm equipment were damaged in both Warren and Marion counties. The most severe damage occurred at a residence and attached garage where exterior walls and the roof structure were heavily damaged after garage door failure and broken windows allowed the building to pressurize and fail outward. Elsewhere, damage was generally less intense and included minor to moderate tree and shelterbelt damage, along with several downed power poles scattered along the path. | | | | | | |
| EF1 | S of Industry to W of Table Grove | McDonough | IL | 40.31°N 90.6°W | 23:52–00:02 | 8.31 mi (13.37 km) | 350 yd (320 m) |
| EF1 | This tornado touched down near US 67, where it damaged barns and outbuildings and snapped numerous large hardwood trees. As it tracked northeast, the tornado caused significant damage to several large grain bins and tore off part of a house’s roof. Farther along the path, damage became more sporadic, consisting mainly of additional tree damage and impacts to outbuildings and grain bins. The tornado weakened and dissipated near the McDonough–Fulton County line. | | | | | | |
| EF1 | Table Grove | Fulton | IL | 40.3631°N 90.4329°W | 00:02–00:10 | 1.93 mi (3.11 km) | 200 yd (180 m) |
| EF1 | A tornado touched down on the west side of Table Grove and tracked eastward through the town. Along its path, several garages were flattened, and numerous homes sustained damage, accompanied by widespread tree damage. The tornado weakened and lifted just east of the town. | | | | | | |
| EFU | SSW of Table Grove | Fulton | IL | 40.3484°N 90.3773°W | 00:09–00:10 | 0.75 mi (1.21 km) | 20 yd (18 m) |
| EFU | A storm chaser reported a brief rope tornado. No damage occurred. | | | | | | |
| EF3 | S of Ipava to Bryant to SW of Canton | Fulton | IL | 40.3308°N 90.3233°W | 00:11–00:38 | 19.92 mi (32.06 km) | 600 yd (550 m) |
| EF3 | This intense cone tornado first produced minor to moderate tree, house, and outbuilding damage near Ipava. More significant damage occurred near Lewistown as one house was unroofed, the second floor of a two-story brick farmhouse was mostly destroyed, and two other homes had partial roof and exterior wall loss. A metal truss transmission tower was blown over, multiple large farm buildings and grain bins were destroyed, and farming equipment was overturned. Farther northeast, a split-level home collapsed and a nearby house lost its roof and some exterior walls. The tornado weakened some but remained strong as it hit Bryant, where the village hall and multiple homes were heavily damaged, while a mobile home and several detached garages were destroyed. An RV was flipped, a metal flag pole was bent to the ground, and vehicles were damaged in town as well. The tornado reached its peak intensity shortly after it exited Bryant, as a farmhouse was swept off its basement foundation and leveled at high-end EF3 strength north-northeast of town. A nearby home was also destroyed and left with only interior rooms standing, two other homes had roof and exterior wall loss, and outbuildings were destroyed. Less intense tree and structure damage occurred northwest of St. David before the tornado strengthened a final time, causing major roof damage to a house and damaging a metal outbuilding near Canton before dissipating. Many large trees were snapped or uprooted along the path, and numerous power poles were snapped as well. Four people were injured by the tornado. | | | | | | |
| EFU | WSW of Little America | Fulton | IL | 40.405°N 90.0777°W | 00:29–00:30 | 0.18 mi (0.29 km) | 20 yd (18 m) |
| EFU | A storm chaser reported a brief satellite tornado to the larger Lewistown tornado. No damage occurred. | | | | | | |

=== April 5 event ===
List of confirmed tornadoes – Wednesday, April 5, 2023
| EF# | Location | County / parish | State | Start coord. | Time (UTC) | Path length | Max. width |
|---|---|---|---|---|---|---|---|
| EF1 | NE of Ellsinore to NW of Williamsville | Carter, Wayne | MO | 36.954°N 90.7°W | 07:48–07:56 | 6.37 mi (10.25 km) | 300 yd (270 m) |
| EF1 | This high-end EF1 tornado began in Carter County with trees uprooted in a very short initial segment of its path before quickly entering Wayne County. After crossing into Wayne County, it carved a swath of forest damage with widespread tree destruction through heavily wooded terrain. As it paralleled Route A, damage remained primarily confined to trees, though a garage sustained minor roof damage from a fallen tree and a nearby house experienced shingle loss. The most significant damage occurred where the tornado crossed Route 49, where acres of trees were flattened. East of Route 49, the tornado weakened as it moved into hilly forested terrain, with the damage path narrowing and tree damage becoming less severe. | | | | | | |
| EF2 | Grassy to Glen Allen to W of Millersville | Bollinger, Cape Girardeau | MO | 37.25°N 90.14°W | 08:30–08:57 | 20.66 mi (33.25 km) | 150 yd (140 m) |
| EF2 | 5 deaths –This strong tornado first struck the rural community of Grassy, where metal buildings were heavily damaged, semi-trailers were flipped, a mobile home was thrown 100 yd (91 m) and completely destroyed, and a house had its roof torn off and sustained some damage to its exterior walls. The tornado then moved through forested areas to the northeast of Grassy, damaging a house, snapping a power pole, and snapping or uprooting countless large hardwood trees. High-end EF2 damage occurred as the tornado struck Glen Allen, where homes were unroofed and had exterior walls torn off. Mobile homes, outbuildings, and shop buildings were obliterated as well, and debris was strewn long distances. A few commercial buildings were also significantly damaged, and large trees were snapped or uprooted in town. The tornado exited Glen Allen and moved northeastward through mostly wooded areas, damaging or destroying a couple of outbuildings and downing trees before dissipating. All five of the fatalities occurred in a single mobile home in Glen Allen. An additional four people were injured as well. | | | | | | |
| EF0 | NNE of Woodhull | Henry | IL | 41.21°N 90.32°W | 09:48–09:53 | 3.12 mi (5.02 km) | 50 yd (46 m) |
| EF0 | A brief high-end EF0 tornado touched down just east of I-74 north of Woodhull, producing localized damage along its short path. Trees were damaged with large branches snapped, particularly around farmstead properties. A few outbuildings were impacted, and one home sustained shingle loss along with partial roof damage on one side of the structure. | | | | | | |
| EF0 | S of Kingston | Madison | AR | 35.967°N 93.5241°W | 10:50–10:53 | 2.8 mi (4.5 km) | 300 yd (270 m) |
| EF0 | Trees were snapped and uprooted along the path. | | | | | | |
| EFU | E of Oak Grove to SE of Blue Eye | Carroll | AR | 36.46°N 83.391°W | 11:03-11:05 | 1.9 mi (3.1 km) | 250 yd (230 m) |
| EFU | Several people witnessed a tornado over open country and no known damage occurred. | | | | | | |
| EF0 | E of Lake Geneva | Walworth | WI | 42.5809°N 88.395°W | 11:38–11:40 | 0.54 mi (0.87 km) | 75 yd (69 m) |
| EF0 | This brief tornado struck a residence, where numerous trees were uprooted and the house suffered minor damage. A fire pit on the property was thrown to the end of the driveway of a neighboring property, and other debris was lofted into a field between the two properties as well. | | | | | | |
| EF0 | W of Linden | Cass | TX | 33.0124°N 94.444°W | 13:44–13:45 | 0.2 mi (0.32 km) | 50 yd (46 m) |
| EF0 | A tornado embedded within a squall line uprooted about ten trees in a convergent pattern and knocked down several large tree limbs. | | | | | | |
| EF0 | SE of New Ross | Montgomery | IN | 39.9578°N 86.7053°W | 15:58–15:59 | 0.26 mi (0.42 km) | 20 yd (18 m) |
| EF0 | This tornado touched down just south of US 136, where it peeled back roof panels on a garage and stripped siding from a nearby home. Roofing material was torn loose and carried roughly 500 yd (460 m) downwind. As the tornado moved northeast and crossed US 136, it caused additional damage to a house and an outbuilding, including a wall panel blown out when winds entered through an open door and nails pulled straight from the structure. Farther along the path, a garage wall on a residence was blown out after the corner of the building was forced inward, and loose objects such as a grill were over 20 yd (18 m) to the east-northeast. | | | | | | |
| EF1 | E of New York | Ballard | KY | 36.99°N 88.93°W | 18:26–18:27 | 0.55 mi (0.89 km) | 25 yd (23 m) |
| EF1 | A short-lived tornado tracked along KY 286, producing localized damage. The most significant impacts occurred at a residence along the highway, where shingles, gutters, and fascia were heavily damaged, an attached porch was affected, and an air conditioning unit was damaged. Several large tree limbs were also snapped and brought down in the immediate area. | | | | | | |
| EF0 | SE of Stella to Northern Murray | Calloway | KY | 36.63°N 88.38°W | 19:02–19:07 | 5.4 mi (8.7 km) | 50 yd (46 m) |
| EF0 | Several homes sustained shingle damage along the tornado’s path, and numerous trees were snapped or uprooted. One garage was shifted completely off its foundation. A commercial site experienced roof damage and blown-in windows, marking the most significant structural impacts of the tornado. | | | | | | |
| EF0 | S of Centerville | Spencer | IN | 37.97°N 87.09°W | 19:42–19:46 | 3.05 mi (4.91 km) | 25 yd (23 m) |
| EF0 | A weak tornado impacted rural areas of southwest of Chrisney, producing mainly tree damage. Several large limbs were brought down, and a few trees were snapped or uprooted along the path. The most notable structural damage occurred near US 231, where the walls of a barn were knocked down. | | | | | | |
| EF1 | N of Leopold | Perry | IN | 38.108°N 86.588°W | 20:14–20:15 | 0.75 mi (1.21 km) | 70 yd (64 m) |
| EF1 | This tornado touched down in just outside of Leopold, beginning in a hilly, forested area where a few trees were snapped or uprooted. As it intensified, the tornado struck a very well-constructed large barn, tearing off a substantial portion of the roof and scattering debris over a wide area. Roofing material and boards were thrown hundreds of yards, with some metal wrapping around a large tree and additional debris landing in a nearby pond. Heavy objects were displaced, including a large tractor tire that was carried several dozen yards and a fully loaded trailer that was shifted inside the barn. Just northeast of the site, a broad swath of forest sustained extensive tree damage with numerous snapped and uprooted trees. Beyond this area, the damage quickly diminished, and no additional impacts were observed across the adjacent open fields. | | | | | | |
| EF1 | SE of Brandenburg | Meade | KY | 37.9545°N 86.1408°W | 20:41–20:42 | 0.27 mi (0.43 km) | 50 yd (46 m) |
| EF1 | A tornado touched down, initially producing extensive tree damage with numerous cedar trees snapped or uprooted, some breaking 10 ft (3.0 m) to 20 ft (6.1 m) above the ground. The pattern of fallen trees showed convergent winds, with debris directed mainly toward the north and northeast. The tornado also caused significant roof damage to several homes and outbuildings in this area. It then crossed Joe Prather Highway, where additional tree damage occurred along with minor damage to nearby homes. The tornado dissipated shortly afterward, as no further damage was observed beyond an adjacent farm field. | | | | | | |
| EF1 | Southwestern Louisville | Jefferson | KY | 38.1522°N 85.8321°W | 20:58–20:59 | 0.82 mi (1.32 km) | 100 yd (91 m) |
| EF1 | This high-end EF1 tornado touched down just east of Dixie Highway and produced widespread damage as it moved through the Pleasure Ridge Park area. The tornado caused extensive tree damage, including large trees uprooted, snapped, or twisted, with some large branches driven into the ground and fallen trees crushing vehicles. Numerous power lines were brought down, and many homes sustained shingle, gutter, and fascia damage, along with roof and siding damage to garages and outbuildings. One outbuilding was completely stripped of its roof and siding, with debris carried roughly 125 yd (114 m) downwind. As the tornado continued, additional hardwood trees were snapped and sporadic roof damage occurred to nearby homes, including one residence where a window was blown out and carried about 30 yd (27 m), accompanied by a noticeable pressure change inside the house. The tornado then intensified as it struck an apartment complex, where a large section of roofing was torn off, twisted, and thrown into nearby trees. Insulation, fascia, and roofing debris were scattered across parking areas and surrounding terrain. Farther along, another apartment building lost significant sections of roof fascia, brick, and siding, with debris dispersed into nearby wooded areas. The tornado lifted shortly thereafter, before reaching additional developed areas. | | | | | | |
| EF1 | Watterson Park (1st tornado) | Jefferson | KY | 38.1982°N 85.6983°W | 21:05–21:06 | 0.39 mi (0.63 km) | 75 yd (69 m) |
| EF1 | This tornado touched down near the Watterson Expressway and produced snapped and uprooted trees early in its path. It then struck the corporate headquarters of Yum! Brands, where a substantial portion of the parapet wall was removed and part of the brick exterior was pushed inward. As the tornado continued, it caused additional tree damage, including trees that were snapped, twisted, and uprooted. The circulation weakened and lifted shortly thereafter, ending this segment of the damage path south of I-264. | | | | | | |
| EF1 | Watterson Park (2nd tornado) | Jefferson | KY | 38.1938°N 85.7003°W | 21:05–21:06 | 0.89 mi (1.43 km) | 100 yd (91 m) |
| EF1 | A tornado developed just south of I-264, beginning with sporadic tree damage near a postal facility. The tornado quickly intensified and struck a DoorDash warehouse, where an exterior wall was blown out and debris was scattered downwind in a broad arc. As it continued east, additional tree damage occurred, including debarking of older softwood trees, and a mini-storage facility sustained significant structural damage. Part of a large Kroger distribution center also suffered notable wall damage. Farther along the path, the tornado caused minor roof damage to a Big Brothers Big Sisters of America facility and additional roof damage to the Louisville Metro Housing Authority complex, along with sections of wooden fencing being blown down. The tornado weakened as it progressed, producing mainly roof damage to the Jefferson County Public Schools' Van Hoose Center before dissipating. | | | | | | |
| EF0 | N of Lancaster | Fairfield | OH | 39.7618°N 82.6479°W | 21:33–21:38 | 4.67 mi (7.52 km) | 100 yd (91 m) |
| EF0 | This tornado first caused damage to an outbuilding, peeling away several metal roof panels that were carried into nearby trees, accompanied by light structural damage and snapped or damaged trees. It then continued with a narrow but continuous path marked by consistent tree damage on both sides of its track. As it progressed, the tornado maintained weak intensity while producing additional minor structural damage to a few properties and continued tree damage, including impacts within a golf course where trees were broken or uprooted. The damage path remained coherent but weak, consisting mainly of downed or damaged trees and occasional light building impacts, before the tornado gradually weakened. The final evidence of damage was limited to tree impacts before the tornado dissipated. | | | | | | |
| EF0 | Southern Pleasantville | Fairfield | OH | 39.8037°N 82.5287°W | 21:39–21:41 | 1 mi (1.6 km) | 100 yd (91 m) |
| EF0 | A high-end EF0 tornado began on the west side of Pleasantville, where initial damage consisted of downed trees and light structural impacts. As it moved through the southern portion of town, metal roof panels were torn free and lofted into nearby trees and power lines. Farther east, the tornado intensified slightly, snapping and uprooting numerous trees and causing additional minor damage to nearby structures. After leaving the residential area, the tornado continued into open fields east of town, where damage became more sporadic. The final evidence of the tornado was additional light damage near a property by a water tower, after which it dissipated. | | | | | | |

=== April 10 event ===
List of confirmed tornadoes – Monday, April 10, 2023
| EF# | Location | County / parish | State | Start coord. | Time (UTC) | Path length | Max. width |
|---|---|---|---|---|---|---|---|
| EF0 | Southeastern Stock Island | Monroe | FL | 24.5664°N 81.7286°W | 00:48–00:51 | 0.3 mi (0.48 km) | 80 yd (73 m) |
| EF0 | A waterspout moved ashore from the Boca Chica Channel, first producing a narrow swath of wind-driven debris across the Stock Island area. Initial damage consisted mainly of dead palm fronds, with some live fronds and coconuts also blown in a consistent southwest direction. As the tornado moved westward into a nearby residential complex, the damage path became more defined, though impacts remained limited to vegetation with no noticeable roof or fascia damage. The tornado then intensified and widened as it entered the Oceans Edge Resort and Marina complex, where its passage was captured on video. Several palm trees were knocked down, a large anchored tent was destroyed, and a concrete-anchored entertainment pagoda was demolished. Heavy patio umbrellas, including some mounted on 800 lb (360 kg) bases, were lifted and thrown significant distances. Crossing the marina, the tornado damaged docks and moved vessels, snapping multiple pilings below the waterline and breaking moorings on a large catamaran, which was pushed partially into the channel. The circulation then exited back over the water as a waterspout. | | | | | | |

=== April 12 event ===
List of confirmed tornadoes – Wednesday, April 12, 2023
| EF# | Location | County / parish | State | Start coord. | Time (UTC) | Path length | Max. width |
|---|---|---|---|---|---|---|---|
| EF0 | Northern Key West | Monroe | FL | 24.5850°N 81.7694°W | 11:58–12:01 | 0.23 mi (0.37 km) | 30 yd (27 m) |
| EF0 | A narrow waterspout moved onshore along the north shoreline of Sigsbee Park, producing a compact but well-defined circulation marked by blowing dust, leaves, and loose debris. As it tracked south-southeast and slightly inland, lawn furniture and a tabletop grill were lofted and thrown up to about 80 yd (73 m) within a very narrow damage path. The circulation exhibited erratic motion, briefly stalling near a large tree where leaves were pulled vertically 100 ft (30 m) to 200 ft (61 m) feet into the vortex and small limbs were broken. Turning east-southeast, the tornado damaged multiple recreational vehicles, tearing off reinforced roller shades, overturning a 400 lb (180 kg) motorcycle, and hurling a large kayak into the side of another RV. An inflatable kayak secured to bicycles was lofted with enough force to snap heavy securing straps and was never recovered. The tornado then moved into an open field, turned sharply north before reaching nearby tents, and caused only minor limb breakage before reemerging over the Gulf of Mexico as a waterspout, where a spray ring formed and the circulation was eventually obscured by heavy rain. | | | | | | |
| EF0 | Western Hollywood | Broward | FL | 26.0341°N 80.1856°W | 19:26–19:27 | 0.01 mi (0.016 km) | 10 yd (9.1 m) |
| EF0 | A very weak tornado did minor tree damage. | | | | | | |
| EF0 | Dania Beach | Broward | FL | 26.0551°N 80.1323°W | 01:40–01:44 | 1.73 mi (2.78 km) | 50 yd (46 m) |
| EF0 | This small tornado began in Dania Beach just south of Fort Lauderdale–Hollywood International Airport, initially causing fence damage and downing trees in nearby neighborhoods. As the circulation skipped west-northwestward, it crossed US 1, where the next concentrated damage occurred at a church, with part of the roof peeled away and blown east and an exterior door blown inward. Farther west, the tornado produced extensive tree damage along a canal corridor before impacting a mobile home community between I-95 and the airport area. In this location, at least half a dozen mobile homes were damaged, with sections of roofing and metal siding torn off, and power poles damaged or knocked down. | | | | | | |

=== April 13 event ===
List of confirmed tornadoes – Thursday, April 13, 2023
| EF# | Location | County / parish | State | Start coord. | Time (UTC) | Path length | Max. width |
|---|---|---|---|---|---|---|---|
| EF1 | E of Cordele | Crisp | GA | 31.9419°N 83.7400°W | 18:37–18:46 | 4.8 mi (7.7 km) | 150 yd (140 m) |
| EF1 | A low-end EF1 tornado blew down wooden power poles and damaged or downed trees. | | | | | | |
| EFU | SE of Farwell | Parmer | TX | 34.315°N 102.876°W | 19:59 | Unknown | Unknown |
| EFU | A brief landspout tornado was photographed by a New Mexico State Police officer driving on US 84. | | | | | | |
| EF0 | Northeastern Cochran | Bleckley | GA | 32.3978°N 83.3417°W | 20:21–20:23 | 0.9 mi (1.4 km) | 100 yd (91 m) |
| EF0 | A brief, high-end EF0 tornado removed some of the siding from the gymnasium of Bleckley County High School and downed a few trees. | | | | | | |

=== April 15 event ===
List of confirmed tornadoes – Saturday, April 15, 2023
| EF# | Location | County / parish | State | Start coord. | Time (UTC) | Path length | Max. width |
|---|---|---|---|---|---|---|---|
| EF2 | NNW of Vichy | Maries | MO | 38.11°N 91.87°W | 21:35–21:42 | 6.87 mi (11.06 km) | 880 yd (800 m) |
| EF2 | This strong, intermittent tornado widespread tree damage along its path, with numerous trees uprooted or snapped, before striking a residence that sustained significant damage to both exterior and some interior walls. As it continued, several other homes experienced minor siding damage while multiple outbuildings sustained varying degrees of damage. At Rolla National Airport, two metal-framed buildings lost their roofs and another had two walls blown down, while two aircraft were also damaged. An ASOS station at the airport measured a 97 mph (156 km/h) The tornado then continued causing additional structural and tree damage before dissipating, with five people sustaining minor injuries. | | | | | | |
| EF1 | Western Fenton to Sunset Hills | St. Louis | MO | 38.532°N 90.5°W | 23:19–23:27 | 4.47 mi (7.19 km) | 100 yd (91 m) |
| EF1 | A tornado touched down in a residential area of Fenton where it snapped several trees and caused minor roof damage to a few homes before moving northeast and crossing Route 141 just south of the I-44 interchange. As it continued roughly parallel to I-44, it produced additional minor damage to trees, roofs, and light posts. The tornado then shifted slightly east across an industrial area where damage remained limited to roofs and trees. After crossing the Meramec River, the tornado moved east-southeast through a golf course, damaging numerous trees and causing minor structural damage before lifting. | | | | | | |
| EF0 | Hillsboro | Jefferson | MO | 38.234°N 90.567°W | 23:24–23:25 | 0.57 mi (0.92 km) | 200 yd (180 m) |
| EF0 | This weak tornado formed on the northwest side of downtown Hillsboro, where it caused minor siding damage to a church before moving east along the northern edge of the downtown area and producing sporadic minor tree damage. As it approached Route 21 Business, it damaged the façade and steeple of another church, then caused minor roof damage to a fire department building and a nearby residence across the state route. Continuing east, the tornado briefly intensified, uprooting several trees and causing minor roof damage to an outbuilding before weakening and dissipating in a wooded area. | | | | | | |
| EF1 | W of Ringgold | Bienville | LA | 32.3226°N 93.3372°W | 23:30–23:42 | 2.24 mi (3.60 km) | 200 yd (180 m) |
| EF1 | An erratic-moving tornado snapped or uprooted numerous trees, including some trees that fell on and damaged a few homes and other structures. | | | | | | |
| EF1 | Northwestern Festus to Herculaneum | Jefferson | MO | 38.236°N 90.432°W | 23:30–23:35 | 3.97 mi (6.39 km) | 300 yd (270 m) |
| EF1 | This tornado formed on the northwest side of Festus and moved through a subdivision, where it caused sporadic minor structural damage before strengthening as it entered a park, snapping and uprooting several trees. As it continued northeast, it reached peak intensity and caused significant damage to a home while producing additional minor damage to homes, outbuildings, and trees. Upon crossing I-55, the tornado overturned a semi-truck, injuring the driver, before continuing into Herculaneum where it caused more minor structural damage and tree damage. The tornado then turned east, producing minor roof damage to a church and knocking over light poles before weakening further and dissipating in a park area. | | | | | | |
| EF1 | Pevely | Jefferson | MO | 38.29°N 90.407°W | 23:34–23:36 | 0.93 mi (1.50 km) | 150 yd (140 m) |
| EF1 | A brief tornado impacted Pevely, where a hotel had roofing material blown off, signs were damaged, and multiple other businesses and a few homes sustained minor damage. Trees and power lines were downed as well. | | | | | | |
| EF1 | WSW of Maeystown to NE of Hecker | Monroe, St. Clair | IL | 38.2116°N 90.2623°W | 23:34–23:59 | 19.57 mi (31.49 km) | 100 yd (91 m) |
| EF1 | This tornado damaged or destroyed multiple outbuildings and snapped or uprooted many trees. A couple of homes sustained minor damage, and power poles were snapped. | | | | | | |
| EF0 | S of Valmeyer | Monroe | IL | 38.276°N 90.329°W | 23:39–23:46 | 4.97 mi (8.00 km) | 100 yd (91 m) |
| EF0 | A weak tornado damaged outbuildings, trees, and a home. | | | | | | |
| EFU | W of Columbia | Monroe | IL | 38.454°N 90.233°W | 23:43–23:44 | 0.34 mi (0.55 km) | 25 yd (23 m) |
| EFU | A brief tornado touched down in the Mississippi River bottoms near Columbia, causing no damage. | | | | | | |
| EF0 | Signal Hill | St. Clair | IL | 38.575°N 90.069°W | 23:59–00:00 | 0.58 mi (0.93 km) | 100 yd (91 m) |
| EF0 | Trees and tree limbs were downed and a few homes sustained minor damage. | | | | | | |
| EFU | W of Collinsville | Madison | IL | 38.673°N 90.0244°W | 00:01–00:02 | 0.16 mi (0.26 km) | 25 yd (23 m) |
| EFU | A brief tornado was recorded just south of I-55 and caused no damage. | | | | | | |
| EF0 | Northern Belleville to Swansea | St. Clair | IL | 38.5195°N 89.9928°W | 00:03–00:04 | 1.12 mi (1.80 km) | 90 yd (82 m) |
| EF0 | Trees and tree limbs were downed in Belleville and Swansea, and wooden power poles were leaned over. A few buildings sustained minimal damage as well. | | | | | | |
| EF1 | Belleville to Southwestern Shiloh | St. Clair | IL | 38.5195°N 89.9871°W | 00:03–00:07 | 3.04 mi (4.89 km) | 200 yd (180 m) |
| EF1 | Homes, apartment buildings, and a few businesses had roofing material torn off, and a power pole was snapped. Many trees were snapped or uprooted in town, some of which landed on structures and caused significant damage. | | | | | | |
| EFU | WNW of New Minden | Washington | IL | 38.4606°N 89.438°W | 00:33–00:34 | 0.17 mi (0.27 km) | 50 yd (46 m) |
| EFU | This brief tornado touched down in an open field, causing no damage. | | | | | | |

=== April 16 event ===
List of confirmed tornadoes – Sunday, April 16, 2023
| EF# | Location | County / parish | State | Start coord. | Time (UTC) | Path length | Max. width |
|---|---|---|---|---|---|---|---|
| EF0 | Micco | Brevard | FL | 27.8749°N 80.504°W | 21:36–21:38 | 0.48 mi (0.77 km) | 100 yd (91 m) |
| EF0 | This tornado touched down in a residential community where approximately twenty-five to thirty structures sustained minor damage, including damage to carports, awnings, siding, and skirting, with some homes losing portions of their roofs when attached awnings were torn away. As it moved east-southeast, it caused additional minor damage to trees and nearby residences in a condominium complex before crossing US 1, where it entered a marina area and displaced several boats from their storage racks. The tornado then moved onto the Indian River Lagoon, becoming a waterspout and dissipating before landfalling on the barrier islands. | | | | | | |

=== April 19 event ===
List of confirmed tornadoes – Wednesday, April 19, 2023
| EF# | Location | County / parish | State | Start coord. | Time (UTC) | Path length | Max. width |
|---|---|---|---|---|---|---|---|
| EF0 | Southeastern Oklahoma City | Cleveland, Oklahoma | OK | 35.373°N 97.419°W | 00:03–00:08 | 2.61 mi (4.20 km) | 250 yd (230 m) |
| EF0 | This high-end EF0 tornado was observed by storm spotters as it moved northward. At the beginning of its path, it damaged trees and multiple outbuildings and caused minor roof damage to homes. After crossing I-240, the tornado clipped the southwest side of Tinker Air Force Base, where a large metal building suffered roof damage, PODS containers were thrown, and some more tree damage occurred. The tornado dissipated shortly thereafter. | | | | | | |
| EFU | ENE of Macedonia | Pottawattamie | IA | 41.21°N 95.3°W | 00:10–00:11 | 0.5 mi (0.80 km) | 10 yd (9.1 m) |
| EFU | Multiple photos, videos, and reports confirmed a brief tornado that lofted dust or light debris. No damage was reported. | | | | | | |
| EF1 | NW of Dibble | Grady, McClain | OK | 35.073°N 97.698°W | 00:20–00:26 | 2.93 mi (4.72 km) | 200 yd (180 m) |
| EF1 | Power poles were snapped, a small trailer was destroyed, and homes, outbuildings, and trees were damaged. | | | | | | |
| EF3 | Cole to NW of Goldsby | McClain | OK | 35.082°N 97.634°W | 00:30–01:05 | 10.9 mi (17.5 km) | 1,200 yd (1,100 m) |
| EF3 | 1 death – This large, intense multiple-vortex tornado first touched down north of Dibble and quickly intensified as it moved generally eastward. Mobile homes and outbuildings were heavily damaged or destroyed, including some that were obliterated and swept away, and the metal frame of one mobile home was bent around a tree. One frame home was leveled at high-end EF3 intensity, multiple other houses had severe roof damage, power poles were snapped, and trees were snapped or uprooted. The tornado turned northeastward and moved directly through Cole at mid-range EF3 strength, where several homes were heavily damaged or destroyed, with roofs completely torn off and multiple exterior walls knocked down. Mobile homes and large metal buildings were also destroyed, and many trees and power lines were downed as well. Continuing northeastward, the tornado weakened but remained strong as it heavily damaged multiple homes, snapped trees and power poles, and obliterated an unanchored mobile home. After turning northward southwest of Goldsby, the tornado weakened significantly, causing minor roof shingle and fence damage in a subdivision northwest of the town. A few trees were downed along this final segment of the path before the tornado dissipated. Two people were injured with one of them dying on the way to the hospital due to a heart attack (this was listed as an indirect fatality). | | | | | | |
| EF1 | S of Blanchard | McClain | OK | 35.094°N 97.654°W | 00:38–00:41 | 1.2 mi (1.9 km) | 250 yd (230 m) |
| EF1 | A satellite tornado to the Cole EF3 inflicted damage to trees and power poles. | | | | | | |
| EF1 | ESE of Cole | McClain | OK | 35.09°N 97.54°W | 00:47–00:53 | 2.2 mi (3.5 km) | 400 yd (370 m) |
| EF1 | This tornado partially collapsed an outbuilding, inflicted major damage to the roof of a home, and snapped or uprooted several trees. | | | | | | |
| EF1 | E of Washington to W of Slaughterville | McClain, Cleveland | OK | 35.058°N 97.476°W | 00:55–01:10 | 7.5 mi (12.1 km) | 700 yd (640 m) |
| EF1 | Two homes sustained minor damage and tree branches were snapped. | | | | | | |
| EF1 | NE of Washington | McClain | OK | 35.087°N 97.46°W | 00:56–00:58 | 0.8 mi (1.3 km) | 50 yd (46 m) |
| EF1 | A storm chaser observed a tornado that damaged power poles, fences, and trees. | | | | | | |
| EFU | NW of Deloit | Crawford | IA | 42.124°N 95.3766°W | 00:56–00:59 | 1.85 mi (2.98 km) | 50 yd (46 m) |
| EFU | This weak tornado was caught on video by several chasers as it remained in rural areas, causing no damage. | | | | | | |
| EF1 | N of Clements | Chase | KS | 38.3203°N 96.7362°W | 01:09–01:10 | 0.06 mi (0.097 km) | 75 yd (69 m) |
| EF1 | A tornado caused multiple outbuildings to collapse and tossed one of them over 250 yards (230 m). The top of a silo was blown off and the walls at the base of the silo were pushed in. | | | | | | |
| EFU | SE of Percival | Fremont | IA | 40.71°N 95.77°W | 01:16 | 0.1 mi (0.16 km) | 10 yd (9.1 m) |
| EFU | Storm chasers reported and took photos of a tornado that remained over open land, causing no damage. | | | | | | |
| EF0 | SW of Elmdale | Chase | KS | 38.3376°N 96.6803°W | 01:17–01:18 | 0.2 mi (0.32 km) | 25 yd (23 m) |
| EF0 | A brief tornado damaged two farm outbuildings, tearing off parts of their roofs. | | | | | | |
| EF0 | Elmdale | Chase | KS | 38.3524°N 96.6733°W | 01:18–01:22 | 2.12 mi (3.41 km) | 100 yd (91 m) |
| EF0 | This tornado touched down and tore part of an outbuilding's roof off before continuing northeast. As the tornado crossed over the intersection of K-150 and US 50, it overturned a semi-truck, injuring the driver. A few nearby road signs were knocked over as well. The tornado continued northeast and entered Elmdale, snapping a tree branch before dissipating in town. | | | | | | |
| EF2 | ESE of Elmdale to NW of Saffordville | Chase | KS | 38.369°N 96.6332°W | 01:22–01:52 | 11.59 mi (18.65 km) | 880 yd (800 m) |
| EF2 | This strong tornado formed just east of Elmdale and moved northeastward, passing just northwest of Strong City. Multiple outbuildings and silos were heavily damaged or completely destroyed, including a large metal outbuilding that had its structural beams severely twisted. A metal flagpole was bent over at a cemetery, and nearby headstones were knocked over. Homes suffered roof and siding damage, and one residence had its windows and garage door blown out. Power poles were snapped, and many hardwood trees were snapped or uprooted as well. | | | | | | |
| EF0 | S of Thurman | Fremont | IA | 40.8°N 95.75°W | 01:23–01:26 | 0.5 mi (0.80 km) | 10 yd (9.1 m) |
| EF0 | A tornado was documented by storm chasers through photographs. No damage occurred. | | | | | | |
| EF1 | W of Cottonwood Falls | Chase | KS | 38.37°N 96.6°W | 01:31–01:37 | 1.28 mi (2.06 km) | 200 yd (180 m) |
| EF1 | This tornado tracked north of Chase County Lake, damaging trees and outbuildings. | | | | | | |
| EF1 | Northeastern Slaughterville | Cleveland | OK | 35.117°N 97.276°W | 01:32–01:35 | 2.1 mi (3.4 km) | 150 yd (140 m) |
| EF1 | Trees were damaged and a barn lost its roof. | | | | | | |
| EF1 | Cottonwood Falls | Chase | KS | 38.367°N 96.548°W | 01:35–01:39 | 1.03 mi (1.66 km) | 50 yd (46 m) |
| EF1 | This tornado moved through Cottonwood Falls damaging trees and the roofs of structures throughout the city. | | | | | | |
| EF2 | ENE of Slaughterville to N of Etowah | Cleveland | OK | 35.125°N 97.261°W | 01:36–01:45 | 5.4 mi (8.7 km) | 700 yd (640 m) |
| EF2 | This strong, multiple-vortex tornado touched down, snapping and uprooting trees, damaging mobile homes, and tossing a grain bin near the beginning of its path. The tornado reached high-end EF2 intensity as it moved eastward to the west of Etowah, completely destroying two well-anchored mobile homes, inflicting significant roof damage to homes, and snapping or uprooting trees and power poles. The tornado then passed north of Etowah as it continued eastward, rolling two RVs, snapping more power poles, and inflicting roof damage to multiple homes before the tornado dissipated. | | | | | | |
| EF0 | WNW of Cottonwood Falls to Northern Strong City | Chase | KS | 38.38°N 96.58°W | 01:38–01:43 | 2.57 mi (4.14 km) | 175 yd (160 m) |
| EF0 | A tornado inflicted roof damage to an outbuilding and minor siding damage to a home. Tree branches were snapped, and barrels and other debris were thrown into a field behind the residence. The tornado then passed through the north side of Strong City, snapping more tree branches before dissipating. | | | | | | |
| EF1 | W of Etowah | Cleveland | OK | 35.133°N 97.214°W | 01:41–01:44 | 1.64 mi (2.64 km) | 50 yd (46 m) |
| EF1 | A satellite tornado to the Etowah EF2 tornado destroyed two large barns and snapped or uprooted numerous trees. | | | | | | |
| EF0 | E of Strong City to NW of Saffordville | Chase | KS | 38.3872°N 96.4687°W | 01:45–01:50 | 3.17 mi (5.10 km) | 150 yd (140 m) |
| EF0 | This tornado crossed US 50 and as it did, it lofted a car 30 yards (27 m) off the highway, injuring the driver. | | | | | | |
| EF2 | N of Etowah to S of Pink | Cleveland, Pottawatomie | OK | 35.159°N 97.173°W | 01:47–01:59 | 4.2 mi (6.8 km) | 2,200 yd (2,000 m) |
| EF2 | This large, high-end EF2 tornado touched down immediately after the first Etowah EF2 tornado dissipated. Homes, mobile homes, and outbuildings were heavily damaged or destroyed, and power poles were snapped. Major tree damage occurred in wooded areas, with multiple trees being stripped of their branches and sustaining some debarking. | | | | | | |
| EF2 | NW of Toledo to S of Dunlap | Chase, Morris | KS | 38.46°N 96.41°W | 01:55–02:08 | 5.21 mi (8.38 km) | 300 yd (270 m) |
| EF2 | A large wooden double-pole high-tension power line transmission structure was destroyed, a house lost part of its roof and had windows blown out, and a propane tank was rolled onto its side. Trees were snapped, and metal roof panels were torn off an outbuilding. | | | | | | |
| EF3 | Pink | Pottawatomie | OK | 35.229°N 97.111°W | 02:04–02:09 | 0.6 mi (0.97 km) | 250 yd (230 m) |
| EF3 | This brief but intense, low-end EF3 tornado occurred after the second Etowah EF2 tornado dissipated. A high-tension metal truss tower was twisted and collapsed, homes suffered roof damage, and trees were snapped or uprooted, including some trees that fell onto power lines. | | | | | | |
| EF0 | E of Norman | Cleveland | OK | 35.238°N 97.296°W | 02:07–02:08 | 0.35 mi (0.56 km) | 60 yd (55 m) |
| EF0 | A tornado occurred on the north side of Lake Thunderbird, damaging trees and an outbuilding. | | | | | | |
| EF2 | NNE of Pink to S of Newalla | Pottawatomie, Cleveland | OK | 35.283°N 97.103°W | 02:13–02:23 | 6.3 mi (10.1 km) | 700 yd (640 m) |
| EF2 | This strong tornado moved northwestward, causing minor to severe roof damage to homes, including one home that had a large portion of its roof removed. Mobile homes, RVs, and farm outbuildings were heavily damaged or destroyed, a church suffered minor roof damage, and trees were snapped or uprooted, including one tree that fell on and damaged a house. | | | | | | |
| EF0 | W of Pink | Cleveland | OK | 35.255°N 97.187°W | 02:18–02:21 | 1 mi (1.6 km) | 75 yd (69 m) |
| EF0 | A house suffered roof damage, and trees were snapped or uprooted. | | | | | | |
| EF1 | Northern Bethel Acres | Pottawatomie | OK | 35.314°N 97.017°W | 02:21–02:28 | 1.85 mi (2.98 km) | 400 yd (370 m) |
| EF1 | An unanchored mobile classroom at Bethel High School was rolled into an adjacent building, a house and a mobile home suffered roof damage, an outbuilding was damaged, and trees were snapped or uprooted. | | | | | | |
| EF2 | Southeastern Bethel Acres to Shawnee to SW of Meeker | Pottawatomie, Lincoln | OK | 35.272°N 97°W | 02:39–03:16 | 15 mi (24 km) | 2,300 yd (2,100 m) |
| EF2 | This very large, strong, high-end EF2 tornado first touched down in southeastern Bethel Acres, snapping trees and power poles, damaging or destroying outbuildings, and inflicting minor to moderate roof damage to homes and a church. The tornado reached low-end EF2 intensity as it entered the southwestern side of Shawnee, damaging numerous homes and destroying the gymnasium at Shawnee High School. Many trees, power poles, and light poles were downed as well. The tornado reached its maximum intensity as it moved through the northern part of Shawnee and caused major damage, including at Oklahoma Baptist University, where many of the buildings on the campus were damaged. This included large brick institutional buildings that suffered significant roof and exterior wall damage. Many homes and apartment buildings had roof and exterior wall loss, a nursing home was heavily damaged, a daycare center was destroyed, and multiple other businesses were heavily damaged or destroyed as well. Vehicles were overturned, numerous large trees were snapped or uprooted in town, and metal power poles were bent to the ground. Hangars were damaged at the Shawnee Regional Airport, and a Bell 206 B3 JetRanger helicopter operated by Tulsa CBS affiliate KOTV had its tail rotor snapped and was badly damaged. The tornado caused additional damage to homes, outbuildings, metal buildings, trees, and power poles as it passed near Aydelotte before dissipating southwest of Meeker. | | | | | | |
| EF1 | ENE of Johnson | Pottawatomie | OK | 35.428°N 96.792°W | 03:39–03:40 | 0.8 mi (1.3 km) | 50 yd (46 m) |
| EF1 | A home had part of its roof removed, an outbuilding and a mobile home were damaged, and trees were snapped or uprooted. | | | | | | |

=== April 20 event ===
List of confirmed tornadoes – Thursday, April 20, 2023
| EF# | Location | County / parish | State | Start coord. | Time (UTC) | Path length | Max. width |
|---|---|---|---|---|---|---|---|
| EF0 | S of Randolph | Riley | KS | 39.4134°N 96.7649°W | 07:45-07:47 | 0.23 mi (0.37 km) | 30 yd (27 m) |
| EF0 | Minor damage to trees occurred. | | | | | | |
| EF1 | E of Morrison to SW of Coleta | Whiteside | IL | 41.8°N 89.93°W | 19:56–20:03 | 5.89 mi (9.48 km) | 300 yd (270 m) |
| EF1 | This high-end EF1 tornado damaged trees, power poles, and farm outbuildings. | | | | | | |
| EF0 | Tyler | Smith | TX | 32.3341°N 95.2896°W | 00:05–00:08 | 0.7 mi (1.1 km) | 65 yd (59 m) |
| EF0 | This tornado touched down near a funeral home in Tyler, where it snapped numerous tree limbs, tore shingles from the roof, and ripped off a large entrance canopy that was thrown into a nearby tree. As it moved northeast, it passed near a medical campus and caused additional damage by peeling sections of a metal roof from a building, lifting and shattering a glass canopy, and snapping more tree limbs. Continuing along its path, the tornado uprooted a hardwood tree that struck and damaged a nearby home and broke large limbs from another tree before dissipating. | | | | | | |
| EF0 | Canyon Lake | Comal | TX | 29.8528°N 98.2662°W | 03:40–03:44 | 2.96 mi (4.76 km) | 250 yd (230 m) |
| EF0 | A high-end EF0 tornado near Canyon Lake inflicted minor roof or siding damage to some homes, and snapped or uprooted many trees. | | | | | | |

=== April 21 event ===
List of confirmed tornadoes – Friday, April 21, 2023
| EF# | Location | County / parish | State | Start coord. | Time (UTC) | Path length | Max. width |
|---|---|---|---|---|---|---|---|
| EF0 | Southern Boca Raton | Palm Beach | FL | 26.3239°N 80.0743°W | 13:36-13:38 | 0.03 mi (0.048 km) | 10 yd (9.1 m) |
| EF0 | Video footage from broadcast media captured a waterspout briefly moving ashore, tossing umbrellas and chairs, before quickly dissipating. | | | | | | |
| EF0 | Eastern Hollywood | Broward | FL | 26.0215°N 80.1144°W | 16:44-16:45 | 0.06 mi (0.097 km) | 10 yd (9.1 m) |
| EF0 | Broadcast media recorded a long-lived waterspout briefly moving ashore, tossing umbrellas and chairs. The tornado then dissipated as it moved further inland. | | | | | | |
| EF0 | NW of Bankston | Fayette | AL | 33.709°N 87.719°W | 00:34–00:39 | 2.28 mi (3.67 km) | 125 yd (114 m) |
| EF0 | Multiple trees were uprooted and tree limbs were snapped, one of which fell on a small carport. A mobile home had some roofing peeled back as well. | | | | | | |

=== April 22 event ===
List of confirmed tornadoes – Saturday, April 22, 2023
| EF# | Location | County / parish | State | Start coord. | Time (UTC) | Path length | Max. width |
|---|---|---|---|---|---|---|---|
| EF0 | Southern Mooresville | Iredell | NC | 35.532°N 80.882°W | 11:27–11:39 | 7.67 mi (12.34 km) | 30 yd (27 m) |
| EF0 | A waterspout formed on the east side of Lake Norman and moved onshore, blowing picnic tables into the lake and snapping trees. The tornado continued to the northeast through the southern part of Mooresville, causing minor damage to trees, fencing, and homes before it dissipated. | | | | | | |
| EF0 | Southeastern Poolesville | Montgomery | MD | 39.1355°N 77.4009°W | 17:58–17:59 | 0.44 mi (0.71 km) | 50 yd (46 m) |
| EF0 | Trees and tree limbs were downed in the southeastern part of Poolesville, and a few structures sustained minor damage. An air conditioning unit was moved off its base, and a small storage container was moved as well. | | | | | | |
| EF0 | Fork to Bel Air North | Baltimore, Harford | MD | 39.47°N 76.44°W | 19:18-19:26 | 6.69 mi (10.77 km) | 50 yd (46 m) |
| EF0 | A weak tornado touched down in Fork, downing a tree that knocked over power poles and lines before strengthening slightly as it crossed into Harford County, where it continued northeast, snapping large branches and causing damage to trees, homes, and vehicles. | | | | | | |
| EF1 | Womelsdorf | Berks | PA | 40.3554°N 76.1971°W | 20:18–20:20 | 1 mi (1.6 km) | 125 yd (114 m) |
| EF1 | This tornado touched down along PA 419 near the Berks–Lebanon County line, where it pushed over several old wooden telephone poles before moving northeast across open fields and snapping or uprooting a few trees near an elementary school. As it crossed the school grounds, it overturned a set of metal bleachers and then entered Womelsdorf, producing minor to locally moderate damage to homes, garages, and barns, including sections of roofing blown off and trees uprooted or large limbs broken, with some debris causing additional damage to structures and vehicles. The tornado then weakened as it continued northeast, producing only minor tree damage before dissipating in a cemetery. | | | | | | |
| EF0 | SW of Prospect Valley (1st tornado) | Weld | CO | 40.0212°N 104.4846°W | 20:21-20:25 | 0.01 mi (0.016 km) | 50 yd (46 m) |
| EF0 | This tornado touched down over an open field, causing no damage. | | | | | | |
| EF0 | SW of Prospect Valley (2nd tornado) | Weld | CO | 40.011°N 104.4936°W | 20:30-20:40 | 0.01 mi (0.016 km) | 50 yd (46 m) |
| EF0 | A tornado remained over open fields. No damage occurred. | | | | | | |
| EF0 | SW of Prospect Valley (3rd tornado) | Weld | CO | 40.025°N 104.3796°W | 20:51-20:53 | 0.01 mi (0.016 km) | 50 yd (46 m) |
| EF0 | A brief tornado occurred over open land. | | | | | | |
| EF0 | Northern Aurora | Adams | CO | 39.7577°N 104.7396°W | 21:13-21:18 | 0.01 mi (0.016 km) | 50 yd (46 m) |
| EF0 | This tornado occurred in an open field in northern Aurora, causing no damage. | | | | | | |
| EF2 | N of Jeffersonville to Rockland | Sullivan | NY | 41.8051°N 74.9244°W | 22:38–23:00 | 9.95 mi (16.01 km) | 300 yd (270 m) |
| EF2 | A strong tornado touched down north of Jeffersonville and moved due-north, snapping or uprooting many large hardwood trees, with near-total deforestation occurring in the most severely affected areas. Barns, outbuildings, and garages were heavily damaged or destroyed, and several homes sustained roof damage, including a two-story house that suffered slight structural deformation and cracking of its interior walls. A 180 feet (55 m) metal truss transmission tower was collapsed and mangled, and power poles were snapped as well. The tornado then moved through Roscoe, where a gas station had its metal roof blown off, a nearby sign was damaged, and homes sustained roof and fascia damage. Fencing was also destroyed and trees were downed as well. Continuing northward into Rockland, the tornado blew the roof off another structure before dissipating. | | | | | | |
| EF1 | SSE of Potters Hill | Duplin | NC | 34.944°N 77.711°W | 00:01–00:02 | 0.06 mi (0.097 km) | 30 yd (27 m) |
| EF1 | Large trees were snapped and a garage sustained shingle damage. A large garage bay door was blown in as well. | | | | | | |
| EF0 | E of Potters Hill | Onslow | NC | 34.9551°N 77.6378°W | 00:08–00:09 | 0.44 mi (0.71 km) | 25 yd (23 m) |
| EF0 | Minor damage to some structures occurred. A boat trailer was moved several feet into the rear of a parked pickup truck. | | | | | | |
| EF1 | NE of Comfort to W of Trenton | Jones | NC | 35.0457°N 77.449°W | 00:43–00:44 | 0.57 mi (0.92 km) | 40 yd (37 m) |
| EF1 | Trees were snapped or uprooted. A metal storage structure was badly damaged and pieces of its metal siding were thrown considerable distances, damaging a house under construction. | | | | | | |
| EF0 | NNW of Trenton | Jones | NC | 35.0934°N 77.3693°W | 00:52–00:53 | 0.14 mi (0.23 km) | 30 yd (27 m) |
| EF0 | Trees were snapped and uprooted by a brief tornado. | | | | | | |

=== April 25 event ===
List of confirmed tornadoes – Tuesday, April 25, 2023
| EF# | Location | County / parish | State | Start coord. | Time (UTC) | Path length | Max. width |
|---|---|---|---|---|---|---|---|
| EFU | W of Dougherty | Floyd | TX | 33.94°N 101.14°W | 02:17–02:20 | 0.18 mi (0.29 km) | 30 yd (27 m) |
| EFU | Numerous storm chasers documented a tornado that remained over open land. | | | | | | |

=== April 26 event ===
List of confirmed tornadoes – Wednesday, April 26, 2023
| EF# | Location | County / parish | State | Start coord. | Time (UTC) | Path length | Max. width |
|---|---|---|---|---|---|---|---|
| EFU | WSW of China Spring | McLennan | TX | 31.63°N 97.38°W | 21:58 | 0.02 mi (0.032 km) | 25 yd (23 m) |
| EFU | A very brief tornado was recorded, causing no damage. | | | | | | |
| EFU | S of China Spring | McLennan | TX | 31.61°N 97.3°W | 22:26 | 0.02 mi (0.032 km) | 25 yd (23 m) |
| EFU | A video on social media showed a tornado quickly forming and dissipating without causing any damage on the banks of the North Bosque River. | | | | | | |

=== April 27 event ===
List of confirmed tornadoes – Thursday, April 27, 2023
| EF# | Location | County / parish | State | Start coord. | Time (UTC) | Path length | Max. width |
|---|---|---|---|---|---|---|---|
| EF0 | N of Scotts Ferry | Calhoun | FL | 30.31°N 85.13°W | 19:14-19:15 | 0.51 mi (0.82 km) | 50 yd (46 m) |
| EF0 | A weak tornado was observed inflicting minor damage to trees along SR 71. | | | | | | |
| EF2 | Hosford | Liberty | FL | 30.3832°N 84.8169°W | 19:54–20:05 | 2.5 mi (4.0 km) | 960 yd (880 m) |
| EF2 | This strong tornado touched down on the southwest side of Hosford, where it initially snapped and uprooted trees and caused minor roof damage to homes and outbuildings. As it moved into the center of town near SR 20 and SR 65, it produced additional minor roof damage to a gas station and nearby buildings. Continuing northeast along SR 65 in northern Hosford, the tornado intensified and caused more widespread damage, with numerous trees snapped or uprooted and several outbuildings destroyed or heavily damaged, while homes sustained roof damage on both sides of the state road. The most severe damage occurred farther northeast along SR 65, where one home had its roof and back porch completely removed, and another nearby home lost a large portion of its roof and suffered partial exterior wall collapse, accompanied by extensive tree damage. The tornado then continued a short distance farther, snapping additional trees before moving over inaccessible terrain where it likely dissipated. | | | | | | |
| EF1 | Lynn Haven | Bay | FL | 30.2485°N 85.6647°W | 20:04–20:05 | 0.8 mi (1.3 km) | 75 yd (69 m) |
| EF1 | A high-end EF1 tornado touched down along the North Bay of the Grand Lagoon, where it first caused minor damage by blowing panels off a gazebo roof. The tornado then began intensifying just to the northeast, where a home had its roof nearly completely removed and an attached carport destroyed, with the roof carried across the street and impacting another house. At this location, vehicles were lifted and shifted slightly, and the second home sustained structural wall damage. As the tornado moved north through a neighborhood, it produced widespread but weaker damage including siding damage to homes, snapped trees, broken windows, and tossed patio furniture. Near the end of its path, the tornado lifted the roof off a large shed before weakening further, with damage becoming more minor and limited to light roof and siding damage and small snapped branches before it dissipated. | | | | | | |
| EF0 | N of Wewahitchka | Calhoun | FL | 30.21°N 85.22°W | 20:33-20:35 | 0.9 mi (1.4 km) | 50 yd (46 m) |
| EF0 | A tornado caused minor damage to numerous trees. | | | | | | |
| EF0 | S of Bloxham | Wakulla | FL | 30.272°N 84.637°W | 21:21-21:26 | 2.3 mi (3.7 km) | 50 yd (46 m) |
| EF0 | This tornado damaged trees within the Apalachicola National Forest. | | | | | | |
| EF1 | NW of Thomasville | Thomas | GA | 30.8596°N 84.0252°W | 22:11–22:13 | 1.21 mi (1.95 km) | 160 yd (150 m) |
| EF1 | This tornado caused extensive damage to trees. | | | | | | |
| EF0 | E of Havana | Gadsden | FL | 30.6255°N 84.3921°W | 22:14–22:18 | 1.48 mi (2.38 km) | 75 yd (69 m) |
| EF0 | Numerous pine trees were snapped and uprooted. | | | | | | |
| EF1 | N of Thomasville | Thomas | GA | 30.9005°N 83.9794°W | 22:20–22:27 | 2.27 mi (3.65 km) | 75 yd (69 m) |
| EF1 | A low-end EF1 tornado snapped and uprooted trees, including one tree that fell on and damaged a barn. | | | | | | |
| EF1 | ENE of Lamont | Madison | FL | 30.395°N 83.7363°W | 22:42–22:45 | 0.55 mi (0.89 km) | 100 yd (91 m) |
| EF1 | A tornado snapped and uprooted trees across rural areas. | | | | | | |

=== April 28 event ===
List of confirmed tornadoes – Friday, April 28, 2023
| EF# | Location | County / parish | State | Start coord. | Time (UTC) | Path length | Max. width |
|---|---|---|---|---|---|---|---|
| EF1 | Northern Fort Hood | Coryell | TX | 31.3821°N 97.882°W | 19:50–20:25 | 14.84 mi (23.88 km) | 1,150 yd (1,050 m) |
| EF1 | A tornado began near Bagget Mountain and quickly produced tree damage, with several large trees snapped or uprooted as it moved southeast. As it continued, the tornado caused its most notable impacts at a sporting range where a cover structure was blown across the road, resulting in two injuries, while additional trees were heavily damaged. The tornado then tracked southeast, continuing to snap trees and cause minor roof damage to nearby structures before crossing FM 116, where more tree damage and minor roof damage to a home occurred. The tornado then moved into Fort Hood where additional trees and power poles were damaged before the tornado likely dissipated over inaccessible areas. | | | | | | |
| EF0 | Eastern Elkin | Surry | NC | 36.254°N 80.8355°W | 20:44 | 0.06 mi (0.097 km) | 60 yd (55 m) |
| EF0 | A brief tornado embedded within a larger area of straight-line winds downed numerous trees. At least two trees fell onto homes. | | | | | | |
| EF0 | Southern Boynton Beach | Palm Beach | FL | 26.506°N 80.08°W | 23:33–23:38 | 0.76 mi (1.22 km) | 100 yd (91 m) |
| EF0 | This weak tornado began in southern Boynton Beach just west of I-95, where it first caused damage by snapping large tree branches and partially stripping a palm tree. As it moved east-northeast and crossed I-95, traffic slowed as the circulation passed, and the tornado continued into a residential community where several homes sustained minor roof uplift, awnings were twisted or torn off and thrown several houses away, and additional trees had large branches or trunks broken. The tornado then continued producing intermittent damage, with isolated snapped trees alongside unaffected areas, before downing a small palm tree near as it lifted. | | | | | | |

=== April 29 event ===
List of confirmed tornadoes – Saturday, April 29, 2023
| EF# | Location | County / parish | State | Start coord. | Time (UTC) | Path length | Max. width |
|---|---|---|---|---|---|---|---|
| EF2 | Eastern Palm Beach Gardens to Juno Ridge | Palm Beach | FL | 26.8251°N 80.0897°W | 21:10–21:21 | 2.61 mi (4.20 km) | 320 yd (290 m) |
| EF2 | A strong tornado moved through Palm Beach Gardens, largely destroying a manufactured home and severely damaging a dry cleaning business. An apartment building had a significant portion of its roof removed, and a clubhouse at the complex also had its roof blown off. Multiple cars were flipped, thrown, and stacked on top of one another, some of which were caught on video being tossed by the tornado. Homes sustained roof damage and had windows blown out, boats were tossed around at a small marina, and metal dumpsters were moved. Large metal light poles and signs were toppled over, and a concrete electrical pole was tilted. Palm trees were shredded, numerous other hardwood trees were snapped or uprooted, and a few were stripped of their branches and sustained low-end debarking. | | | | | | |

=== April 30 event ===
List of confirmed tornadoes – Sunday, April 30, 2023
| EF# | Location | County / parish | State | Start coord. | Time (UTC) | Path length | Max. width |
|---|---|---|---|---|---|---|---|
| EF1 | E of Punta Gorda | Charlotte | FL | 26.92°N 81.63°W | 10:38–10:41 | 4.61 mi (7.42 km) | 50 yd (46 m) |
| EF1 | This high-end EF1 tornado destroyed a metal storage barn and a section of fencing, snapped several telephone poles, and overturned a trailer into a tree. | | | | | | |
| EF3 | Northern Virginia Beach | City of Virginia Beach | VA | 36.883°N 76.086°W | 21:48–21:53 | 4.5 mi (7.2 km) | 350 yd (320 m) |
| EF3 | See article on this tornado - This strong and damaging tornado first touched down in a residential area on the north side of Virginia Beach, first snapping and uprooting numerous trees, many of which landed on homes and caused heavy structural damage. The tornado reached its peak intensity in a subdivision near Broad Bay, where multiple large and very well-built homes sustained major structural damage, including roofs torn off and loss of some exterior walls. One house was partially shifted off of its foundation. The tornado then crossed over Broad Bay as a waterspout and weakened as it came ashore again on the opposite side, inflicting less severe damage to trees and homes. More trees were downed and a building sustained minor damage at Joint Expeditionary Base Fort Story before the tornado entered another residential area, inflicting some additional minor house damage before dissipating. | | | | | | |

== May ==
Confirmed tornadoes by Enhanced Fujita rating
| EFU | EF0 | EF1 | EF2 | EF3 | EF4 | EF5 | Total |
|---|---|---|---|---|---|---|---|
| 75 | 57 | 39 | 7 | 0 | 0 | 0 | 178 |

=== May 2 event ===
List of confirmed tornadoes – Tuesday, May 2, 2023
| EF# | Location | County / parish | State | Start coord. | Time (UTC) | Path length | Max. width |
|---|---|---|---|---|---|---|---|
| EF0 | ENE of Denmark | Oxford | ME | 43.98°N 70.79°W | 15:20 | Unknown | Unknown |
| EF0 | A brief landspout tornado caused minor damage to trees, sheds, and a barn. | | | | | | |

=== May 4 event ===
List of confirmed tornadoes – Thursday, May 4, 2023
| EF# | Location | County / parish | State | Start coord. | Time (UTC) | Path length | Max. width |
|---|---|---|---|---|---|---|---|
| EF0 | Northern Carson | Los Angeles | CA | 33.8755°N 118.2652°W | 15:45–15:50 | 0.06 mi (0.097 km) | 15 yd (14 m) |
| EF0 | This brief tornado caused mainly roof and tree damage. | | | | | | |
| EF0 | Southern Compton to Northern Long Beach | Los Angeles | CA | 33.8811°N 118.2153°W | 15:56–16:00 | 0.73 mi (1.17 km) | 15 yd (14 m) |
| EF0 | A weak tornado downed power lines, tore tarps from a nursery, and inflicted minor roof and siding damage to homes in Compton and Long Beach. | | | | | | |
| EF0 | W of Bellevue | Clay | TX | 33.638°N 98.019°W | 00:06 | 0.1 mi (0.16 km) | 20 yd (18 m) |
| EF0 | Two storm chasers recorded a brief tornado that caused no damage. | | | | | | |
| EF0 | N of Alamota | Lane | KS | 38.53°N 100.3°W | 02:09 | 0.01 mi (0.016 km) | 1 yd (0.91 m) |
| EF0 | An off-duty NWS employee observed a brief tornado. No damage occurred. | | | | | | |

=== May 5 event ===
List of confirmed tornadoes – Friday, May 5, 2023
| EF# | Location | County / parish | State | Start coord. | Time (UTC) | Path length | Max. width |
|---|---|---|---|---|---|---|---|
| EF1 | S of Darr to SW of Lexington | Dawson, Gosper | NE | 40.7321°N 99.9006°W | 03:54–04:00 | 4.68 mi (7.53 km) | 80 yd (73 m) |
| EF1 | This tornado developed northwest of Johnson Lake and initially overturned irrigation pivots before moving into a residential area where two large storage sheds were completely destroyed and additional damage occurred to trees, smaller buildings, windows, and roofs, including debris driven into a home’s roof. As it tracked east across the lake, it intensified and caused significant damage to multiple homes along the shoreline, where several houses had porches blown apart, one lost a large section of its roof, and another had its entire roof removed, while power poles were snapped and trees were widely damaged. Continuing east, the tornado overturned another irrigation pivot and peeled back metal roofing from a large building before lifting. | | | | | | |
| EFU | W of Robertson | Uinta | WY | 40.17°N 110.44°W | 17:20–17:35 | Unknown | Unknown |
| EFU | A landspout was filmed did not cause any known damage. | | | | | | |

=== May 6 event ===
List of confirmed tornadoes – Saturday, May 6, 2023
| EF# | Location | County / parish | State | Start coord. | Time (UTC) | Path length | Max. width |
|---|---|---|---|---|---|---|---|
| EF1 | ESE of Morse to SW of Lyons Point | Acadia | LA | 30.1102°N 92.4768°W | 10:57–11:01 | 5.27 mi (8.48 km) | 75 yd (69 m) |
| EF1 | A tornado touched down and moved rapidly southeast, where it caused significant damage in a subdivision by destroying roughly eight outbuildings and damaging the roofs of seven to ten homes, while a camper was flipped into a house. As it continued, another outbuilding was destroyed near LA 1115, and a person was injured when the tornado struck a boat during crawfish harvesting. The tornado then produced additional damage by impacting power lines before dissipating. | | | | | | |
| EF0 | NE of Goodwin | Deuel | SD | 44.96°N 96.76°W | 22:01-22:02 | 0.01 mi (0.016 km) | 10 yd (9.1 m) |
| EF0 | This tornado was photographed moving over pastureland. | | | | | | |
| EF0 | N of La Bolt | Grant | SD | 45.06°N 96.67°W | 22:25-22:30 | 0.85 mi (1.37 km) | 10 yd (9.1 m) |
| EF0 | A storm chaser documented a tornado that tracked through pastureland and fields, possibly damaging a few trees. | | | | | | |
| EF0 | ENE of Granite Falls | Renville | MN | 44.8185°N 95.4746°W | 23:42-23:51 | 1.62 mi (2.61 km) | 25 yd (23 m) |
| EF0 | A tornado caused minor damage to an outbuilding. | | | | | | |
| EFU | NNW of Renville | Renville | MN | 44.8547°N 95.2757°W | 00:18-00:23 | 1.01 mi (1.63 km) | 25 yd (23 m) |
| EFU | This tornado was recorded by a storm chaser over fields. No damage was noted. | | | | | | |
| EFU | S of Louisburg | Lac qui Parle | MN | 45.1°N 96.19°W | 00:20-00:30 | 2.29 mi (3.69 km) | 25 yd (23 m) |
| EFU | Multiple photos of this tornado was taken and no damage was reported. | | | | | | |
| EFU | SSE of Prinsburg | Renville, Kandiyohi | MN | 44.8799°N 95.1569°W | 00:31-00:36 | 1.58 mi (2.54 km) | 25 yd (23 m) |
| EFU | Storm chasers observed a weak tornado doing no known damage. | | | | | | |
| EF0 | Trenton | Grundy | MO | 40.07°N 93.62°W | 00:39–00:41 | 0.53 mi (0.85 km) | 25 yd (23 m) |
| EF0 | A high-end EF0 tornado briefly touched down in Trenton, damaging the roof and brick siding of a church. | | | | | | |
| EF2 | S of Hecla to E of Linneus | Linn | MO | 39.93°N 93.31°W | 01:22–01:46 | 12.38 mi (19.92 km) | 250 yd (0.14 mi) |
| EF2 | This high-end EF2 tornado blew the roof off a home, causing it to mostly collapse. Only a few of the home's walls were left standing, while the roof structure landed intact next to the home. Another home had its detached garage destroyed, and other homes suffered roof damage. Grain bins, barns, and other outbuildings were also damaged or destroyed, and a mobile home partially collapsed. Power poles and trees were snapped or uprooted as well. | | | | | | |
| EF1 | NNW of St. Catharine to NW of Bucklin | Linn | MO | 39.84°N 93.02°W | 01:56–02:14 | 8.51 mi (13.70 km) | 100 yd (91 m) |
| EF1 | A few large outbuildings partially collapsed and large trees were downed, including one tree that fell on a garage. | | | | | | |
| EF0 | NNE of Box Elder | Meade | SD | 44.202°N 103.012°W | 02:08-02:11 | 0.02 mi (0.032 km) | 20 yd (18 m) |
| EF0 | This landspout tornado remained over open rangeland, inflicting no damage. | | | | | | |

=== May 7 event ===
List of confirmed tornadoes – Sunday, May 7, 2023
| EF# | Location | County / parish | State | Start coord. | Time (UTC) | Path length | Max. width |
|---|---|---|---|---|---|---|---|
| EF1 | N of Georgetown | Floyd | IN | 38.3234°N 85.9919°W | 12:42-12:43 | 0.11 mi (0.18 km) | 100 yd (91 m) |
| EF1 | This brief tornado caused localized damage at a residential property, where several trees were snapped or uprooted, including a large healthy oak tree that was uprooted and fell onto another nearby house, causing structural damage to the roof and gutters. An outbuilding sustained minor siding and gutter damage, while most impacts were confined to trees, including snapped branches. | | | | | | |
| EF0 | Eastern Georgetown | Floyd | IN | 38.2919°N 85.9541°W | 12:46-12:47 | 0.38 mi (0.61 km) | 150 yd (140 m) |
| EF0 | A tornado touched down in the a subdivision just south of SR 64, where it caused mainly minor damage to over a dozen homes, including shingle, soffit, gutter, and fascia damage. A playground structure was lifted and thrown into a fence, while tree damage was minimal within the neighborhood. As the tornado moved east, the damage remained light and sporadic, with the final observed impact being a topped tree in a wooded area just before reaching I-64, where the tornado dissipated. | | | | | | |
| EF1 | Northern New Albany | Floyd | IN | 38.3433°N 85.8179°W | 12:48–12:49 | 0.35 mi (0.56 km) | 125 yd (114 m) |
| EF1 | A tornado touched down on the Indiana University Southeast campus, where it caused roof and siding damage to a large academic building before moving northeast and snapping power poles along SR 111. As it entered nearby residential areas, it produced more significant impacts, including widespread tree damage with trees uprooted, snapped, and twisted in varying directions, and caused damage to apartment buildings with shingles, gutters, and downspouts torn away, while one building lost a large section of its roof with debris scattered hundreds of yards. Two people were injured in this area, and additional damage included outbuildings thrown in opposite directions, fencing destroyed, power lines snapped, and roofing debris impaled into the ground. Continuing along its path, the tornado caused further tree damage and isolated structural impacts before weakening, with the final damage consisting of topped trees. | | | | | | |
| EF1 | S of Edwardsville | Floyd | IN | 38.2462°N 85.9028°W | 12:52–12:53 | 0.41 mi (0.66 km) | 100 yd (91 m) |
| EF1 | A brief tornado downed, uprooted, snapped or twisted numerous trees, one of which fell onto a home causing gutter and fascia damage. Several power lines were downed two power poles were knocked over as well. | | | | | | |
| EF1 | SSE of Edwardsville to Southwestern Louisville to Shively | Floyd (IN), Jefferson (KY) | IN, KY | 38.2169°N 85.8699°W | 12:57–13:03 | 4.45 mi (7.16 km) | 200 yd (180 m) |
| EF1 | The tornado began along SR 111, where it caused significant roof damage to two large barns and minor roof damage to a nearby well-built home, while also lifting and throwing a heavy storm cellar door nearly 100 yards (91 m) and moving a large sign several feet, along with uprooting and snapping a few trees. As it crossed SR 111 and tracked along the Ohio River, it snapped and twisted numerous trees and caused additional roof damage to a residence and a barn where metal panels were peeled away. The tornado then crossed the river into Kentucky, where it produced widespread tree damage, including many snapped and uprooted trees and large fallen branches, before weakening briefly as it moved through residential areas and crossed I-264. It then regained some strength, snapping more trees and causing continued tree damage near neighborhoods west of US 31W, with additional clusters of uprooted and snapped trees just before the tornado dissipated. | | | | | | |
| EF0 | SW of Shelbyville | Shelby | KY | 38.205°N 85.2667°W | 13:25–13:26 | 0.61 mi (0.98 km) | 30 yd (27 m) |
| EF0 | A weak tornado touched down just southwest of Shelbyville and blew out a Valero gas station sign and blowing debris across KY 55, before continuing to a nearby Stanley Black & Decker plant where several sections of roofing were lifted and thrown 30 yards (27 m)-40 yards (37 m) to the east-southeast. The tornado lifted just after impacting the plant. | | | | | | |
| EF0 | ENE of Hendersonville | Henderson | NC | 35.341°N 82.415°W | 22:30–22:31 | 0.6 mi (0.97 km) | 15 yd (14 m) |
| EF0 | A brief tornado uprooted trees, snapped branches, and caused minor roof damage. This was the first confirmed tornado in Henderson County since 1977. | | | | | | |
| EF1 | Northern West Liberty to WSW of Atalissa | Muscatine | IA | 41.59°N 91.27°W | 22:48-22:54 | 4.95 mi (7.97 km) | 100 yd (91 m) |
| EF1 | This tornado touched down and struck the north side of West Liberty, where multiple large outbuildings were damaged and shifted off their foundations, including one that sustained collapse of a wall. A batting cage was also damaged and tree limbs were snapped. The tornado exited town and caused additional minor tree and outbuilding damage as it moved to the southeast, toppling two power poles before dissipating. | | | | | | |
| EFU | S of Grant Park | Kankakee | IL | 41.2284°N 87.6351°W | 23:30-23:32 | 0.21 mi (0.34 km) | 50 yd (46 m) |
| EFU | A landspout kicked up dust in a field just to the south of Grant Park. No damage occurred. | | | | | | |
| EFU | E of Yorktown | Bureau | IL | 41.57°N 89.792°W | 23:40-23:41 | 0.1 mi (0.16 km) | 20 yd (18 m) |
| EFU | A brief landspout was observed by broadcast media causing no damage. | | | | | | |
| EFU | SW of Grant Park | Kankakee | IL | 41.2186°N 87.6727°W | 23:42–23:46 | 0.97 mi (1.56 km) | 50 yd (46 m) |
| EFU | A landspout tornado threw a car into a ditch but did not cause any structural damage. | | | | | | |
| EFU | N of Blakes | LaSalle | IL | 41.4719°N 88.7531°W | 00:09-00:10 | 0.09 mi (0.14 km) | 25 yd (23 m) |
| EFU | This very brief landspout tornado was filmed. No damage occurred. | | | | | | |
| EFU | E of Nebraska City, NE | Fremont | IA | 40.68°N 95.77°W | 01:08 | 0.05 mi (0.080 km) | 50 yd (46 m) |
| EFU | A tornado was recorded throwing up dust in a field. No damage was reported. | | | | | | |

=== May 8 event ===
List of confirmed tornadoes – Monday, May 8, 2023
| EF# | Location | County / parish | State | Start coord. | Time (UTC) | Path length | Max. width |
|---|---|---|---|---|---|---|---|
| EF0 | N of Sour Lake to SW of Lumberton | Hardin | TX | 30.2439°N 94.3691°W | 20:00–20:14 | 6.08 mi (9.78 km) | 75 yd (69 m) |
| EF0 | A weak tornado occurred and inflicted minor damage on trees and roofs. | | | | | | |
| EFU | SE of Delphi to W of Flora | Carroll | IN | 40.5609°N 86.6217°W | 21:54–22:01 | 3.08 mi (4.96 km) | 25 yd (23 m) |
| EFU | This landspout was documented by several people as it remained over fields, causing no damage. | | | | | | |

=== May 9 event ===
List of confirmed tornadoes – Tuesday, May 9, 2023
| EF# | Location | County / parish | State | Start coord. | Time (UTC) | Path length | Max. width |
|---|---|---|---|---|---|---|---|
| EFU | WSW of Miltonvale | Cloud | KS | 39.3259°N 97.5212°W | 17:56-17:58 | 1.6 mi (2.6 km) | 30 yd (27 m) |
| EFU | A storm chaser photographed a tornado that inflicted no damage. | | | | | | |
| EFU | ENE of Oak Hill to W of Ladysmith | Clay | KS | 39.2725°N 97.2673°W | 18:24-18:25 | 1.92 mi (3.09 km) | 30 yd (27 m) |
| EFU | This tornado was briefly observed by a storm chaser before it became rain-wrapped over open fields. No damage was noted. | | | | | | |
| EF0 | NNW of Windom | Cottonwood | MN | 43.8942°N 95.1545°W | 18:42–18:46 | 1.49 mi (2.40 km) | 25 yd (23 m) |
| EF0 | A weak landspout tornado ripped some shingles off a roof at a farmstead. | | | | | | |
| EFU | E of Saragosa | Reeves | TX | 31.03°N 103.48°W | 22:16-22:21 | 1 mi (1.6 km) | 50 yd (46 m) |
| EFU | This landspout was photographed over open country doing no damage. | | | | | | |
| EF0 | NE of St. Ignatius | Lake | MT | 47.361°N 114.055°W | 23:30-00:00 | 0.47 mi (0.76 km) | 15 yd (14 m) |
| EF0 | A tornado tore metal roofing off a farm outbuilding and damaged some shingles on a house. | | | | | | |

=== May 10 event ===
List of confirmed tornadoes – Wednesday, May 10, 2023
| EF# | Location | County / parish | State | Start coord. | Time (UTC) | Path length | Max. width |
|---|---|---|---|---|---|---|---|
| EFU | N of Pine Bluff | Jefferson | AR | 34.31°N 91.97°W | 18:05 | 0.1 mi (0.16 km) | 25 yd (23 m) |
| EFU | A tornado persisted for only thirty seconds over an open field, lofting dust. | | | | | | |
| EFU | NW of Selden | Sheridan | KS | 39.57°N 100.61°W | 22:26–22:30 | 0.86 mi (1.38 km) | 100 yd (91 m) |
| EFU | A tornado remained over open fields. | | | | | | |
| EF1 | ENE of Woodrow | Morgan | CO | 40.0052°N 103.4857°W | 23:54-00:06 | 6 mi (9.7 km) | 20 yd (18 m) |
| EF1 | This tornado impacted a property, where it uplifted and removed the roof of a sturdy home, exposing portions of the second floor. Nearby, a barn sustained roof damage, two small storage sheds were destroyed, and several trees were uprooted. The tornado continued over open land before eventually lifting. | | | | | | |
| EF0 | ENE of Woodrow | Washington | CO | 40.01°N 103.41°W | 23:54-23:55 | 0.01 mi (0.016 km) | 20 yd (18 m) |
| EF0 | A brief tornado occurred in an open field, causing no damage. | | | | | | |
| EFU | WSW of Akron | Washington | CO | 40.12°N 103.35°W | 00:18 | Unknown | Unknown |
| EFU | This brief landspout remained over open land. | | | | | | |
| EF0 | W of Akron to ESE of Brush | Washington | CO | 40.16°N 103.42°W | 00:20-00:24 | 4.18 mi (6.73 km) | 20 yd (18 m) |
| EF0 | A tornado tracked northward through open country. No damage was noted. | | | | | | |
| EF0 | NNW of Akron | Washington | CO | 40.2077°N 103.244°W | 00:28-00:30 | 0.01 mi (0.016 km) | 20 yd (18 m) |
| EF0 | No damage occurred when a tornado briefly touched down. | | | | | | |
| EF0 | SW of Akron (1st tornado) | Washington | CO | 40.09°N 103.35°W | 00:31-00:32 | 0.01 mi (0.016 km) | 20 yd (18 m) |
| EF0 | A tornado touched down briefly in an open field. No damage was reported. | | | | | | |
| EF0 | SW of Akron (2nd tornado) | Washington | CO | 40.07°N 103.33°W | 00:38-00:39 | 0.01 mi (0.016 km) | 20 yd (18 m) |
| EF0 | This weak tornado occurred over open country, producing no damage. | | | | | | |

=== May 11 event ===
List of confirmed tornadoes – Thursday, May 11, 2023
| EF# | Location | County / parish | State | Start coord. | Time (UTC) | Path length | Max. width |
|---|---|---|---|---|---|---|---|
| EF1 | Southwestern Shreveport | Caddo | LA | 32.4074°N 93.8307°W | 11:06–11:12 | 2.65 mi (4.26 km) | 130 yd (120 m) |
| EF1 | A low-end EF1 tornado touched down in the southwestern part of Shreveport near Shreveport Regional Airport. Numerous trees were snapped or uprooted and several buildings were damaged. | | | | | | |
| EF1 | S of Stanley | DeSoto | LA | 31.9418°N 93.8942°W | 12:55–12:56 | 0.19 mi (0.31 km) | 130 yd (120 m) |
| EF1 | A brief tornado inflicted considerable damage to an outbuilding, damaged the roof of a home, inflicted minor damage to a mobile home, and snapped or uprooted trees. | | | | | | |
| EF1 | SE of Colfax | Grant | LA | 31.4826°N 92.6146°W | 13:03 | 0.5 mi (0.80 km) | 80 yd (73 m) |
| EF1 | This tornado was captured on video snapped or uprooted approximately fifteen trees. | | | | | | |
| EF1 | NW of Dixie Inn | Webster | LA | 32.638°N 93.3815°W | 13:21–13:22 | 0.14 mi (0.23 km) | 60 yd (55 m) |
| EF1 | A brief tornado damaged the roof of a small metal outbuilding and the porch of a home. Six hardwood trees were uprooted as well. | | | | | | |
| EF1 | S of Alabama Landing | Union | LA | 32.821°N 92.077°W | 15:59–16:00 | 0.58 mi (0.93 km) | 80 yd (73 m) |
| EF1 | Trees and tree branches were snapped and twisted. | | | | | | |
| EF1 | S of Hamburg | Ashley | AR | 33.1472°N 91.8186°W | 17:41–17:43 | 0.45 mi (0.72 km) | 140 yd (130 m) |
| EF1 | This high-end EF1 tornado began near US 425, where it initially snapped and scattered tree limbs around a church property before continuing along the highway and uprooting trees along a forest line. As it progressed, it caused roof damage to a home and snapped a tree trunk while uprooting additional trees in the yard, then crossed US 425 and impacted another residence where a wooden carport was blown across the yard and part of the roof was damaged. The tornado continued producing tree damage, including several large uprooted trees, before weakening and dissipating shortly afterward. | | | | | | |
| EF1 | E of Hale, CO | Cheyenne (KS), Yuma (CO) | KS, CO | 39.59°N 102.02°W | 17:57–18:03 | 5.17 mi (8.32 km) | 100 yd (91 m) |
| EF1 | Four power poles were damaged by a tornado that remained predominantly over rural terrain. | | | | | | |
| EFU | S of McDonald | Rawlins | KS | 39.75°N 101.35°W | 18:35–18:37 | 1.16 mi (1.87 km) | 100 yd (91 m) |
| EFU | A brief tornado had several photos and videos taken of it. No damage was reported. | | | | | | |
| EFU | SW of McDonald | Rawlins | KS | 39.78°N 101.38°W | 18:39–18:42 | 1.78 mi (2.86 km) | 75 yd (69 m) |
| EFU | This tornado moved northwest, narrowly missing the town of McDonald. No damage occurred. | | | | | | |
| EFU | N of Max to SSW of Wauneta | Dundy | NE | 40.27°N 101.38°W | 20:01–20:06 | 3.02 mi (4.86 km) | 75 yd (69 m) |
| EFU | A tornado remained over open fields. | | | | | | |
| EF0 | E of Weskan | Wallace | KS | 38.78°N 101.91°W | 22:33-22:48 | 8.48 mi (13.65 km) | 100 yd (91 m) |
| EF0 | This tornado moved primarily over open country, causing little damage until it struck a residence where it broke sliding glass door windows and flipped a section of porch roofing onto the main structure. It then continued briefly before crossing US 40, where it quickly dissipated. | | | | | | |
| EF0 | W of Weskan | Wallace | KS | 38.83°N 102.03°W | 22:41-22:47 | 3.17 mi (5.10 km) | 100 yd (91 m) |
| EF0 | A multi-vortex tornado damaged an irrigation pivot. | | | | | | |
| EFU | SE of Arapahoe | Cheyenne | CO | 38.83°N 102.13°W | 22:45–22:52 | 1.15 mi (1.85 km) | 150 yd (140 m) |
| EFU | A tornado remained over open fields, causing no damage. | | | | | | |
| EF1 | Weskan | Wallace | KS | 38.858°N 101.964°W | 22:45–22:49 | 1.25 mi (2.01 km) | 175 yd (160 m) |
| EF1 | This multi-vortex, high-end EF1 tornado moved directly through Weskan, producing widespread damage to structures and vegetation as it passed through town. At the Weskan School, windows were broken and sections of roofing and brick were blown off, while nearby athletic facilities were heavily impacted with bleachers thrown about 60 feet (18 m), a scoreboard blown over, a field goal bent, and equipment scattered, along with damage to small buildings. Throughout the town, homes and outbuildings sustained damage, fencing and street signs were blown down, and power poles were snapped or pushed over, while large metal irrigation pipes were thrown into nearby fields. Numerous trees were snapped or uprooted, and vehicles were damaged by flying debris before the tornado weakened and lifted just north of town. | | | | | | |
| EFU | E of Arapahoe | Cheyenne | CO | 38.845°N 102.129°W | 22:46–22:49 | 0.68 mi (1.09 km) | 75 yd (69 m) |
| EFU | A tornado remained over open land causing no damage. | | | | | | |
| EF0 | N of Sharon Springs | Wallace | KS | 39.02°N 101.74°W | 23:09-23:29 | 6.62 mi (10.65 km) | 100 yd (91 m) |
| EF0 | This weak tornado struck a farmstead, damaging a shed and fences. Hay bales were also tossed. | | | | | | |
| EFU | W of Winona | Logan | KS | 39.05°N 101.39°W | 23:25-23:42 | 5.8 mi (9.3 km) | 100 yd (91 m) |
| EFU | This tornado tracked through open farmland. A farmstead was affected by the tornado but was unable to be surveyed. | | | | | | |
| EF0 | NNW of Norge | Grady | OK | 35.013°N 98.017°W | 23:25-23:26 | 1 mi (1.6 km) | 20 yd (18 m) |
| EF0 | A small tornado that caused no damage was observed by a storm chaser. | | | | | | |
| EFU | SSE of Edson | Sherman | KS | 39.22°N 101.48°W | 23:47-23:52 | 0.76 mi (1.22 km) | 75 yd (69 m) |
| EFU | This tornado was observed by storm spotters as it remained over open fields. | | | | | | |
| EFU | SSE of Tuttle | Grady | OK | 35.229°N 97.807°W | 23:57-00:08 | 2.9 mi (4.7 km) | 50 yd (46 m) |
| EFU | Storm chasers and local broadcast media observed a tornado that caused no damage. | | | | | | |
| EFU | SSE of Levant | Thomas | KS | 39.32°N 101.17°W | 00:29–00:32 | 1.48 mi (2.38 km) | 75 yd (69 m) |
| EFU | A tornado that did no damage was reported. | | | | | | |
| EF0 | ESE of Bridge Creek | Grady, McClain | OK | 35.203°N 97.675°W | 00:36-00:38 | 0.36 mi (0.58 km) | 30 yd (27 m) |
| EF0 | A tornado damaged trees and a barn. | | | | | | |
| EF0 | SW of Newcastle | McClain | OK | 35.211°N 97.654°W | 00:42–00:49 | 2.1 mi (3.4 km) | 30 yd (27 m) |
| EF0 | Two homes had shingle damage and some trees were also damaged. | | | | | | |
| EFU | NNW of Rush Springs | Grady | OK | 34.807°N 97.9737°W | 00:45 | 0.2 mi (0.32 km) | 20 yd (18 m) |
| EFU | A brief tornado was observed and caused no damage. | | | | | | |
| EF0 | E of Hickok (1st tornado) | Grant | KS | 37.56°N 101.11°W | 00:50–00:51 | 0.01 mi (0.016 km) | 1 yd (0.91 m) |
| EF0 | A landspout remained over a field. | | | | | | |
| EF0 | E of Hickok (2nd tornado) | Grant | KS | 37.56°N 101.11°W | 00:51–00:52 | 0.01 mi (0.016 km) | 1 yd (0.91 m) |
| EF0 | This landspout was observed over a field causing no damage. | | | | | | |
| EF0 | W of Dibble (1st tornado) | Grady | OK | 34.995°N 97.696°W | 01:04-01:07 | 1.5 mi (2.4 km) | 75 yd (69 m) |
| EF0 | Minor tree damage occurred. | | | | | | |
| EF0 | W of Dibble (2nd tornado) | McClain | OK | 35.028°N 97.667°W | 01:12-01:13 | 0.4 mi (0.64 km) | 30 yd (27 m) |
| EF0 | Some trees were damaged by a weak tornado. | | | | | | |
| EF1 | Cole to Goldsby | McClain | OK | 35.07°N 97.601°W | 01:29-01:59 | 9.4 mi (15.1 km) | 250 yd (230 m) |
| EF1 | This multi-vortex, high-end EF1 tornado developed southwest of Cole and moved east-northeast through the southern part of town producing tree damage and removing sections of roofing from homes, including a large portion of roof torn from a residence near the eastern edge of town. It then continued toward Goldsby, causing additional tree damage and roof damage to structures along its path. Near the end of its track, the tornado made a sharp turn to the northwest and continued briefly before dissipating. | | | | | | |
| EF1 | Northern Noble | Cleveland | OK | 35.142°N 97.409°W | 02:03–02:13 | 2.25 mi (3.62 km) | 300 yd (270 m) |
| EF1 | A tornado developed in the Canadian River valley just in western Noble and moved east to northeast through the northern part of town, producing damage to structures along its path. The most significant impacts occurred just north of US 77, where homes and businesses sustained notable roof damage. The tornado then weakened as it continued northeast and lifted. | | | | | | |
| EF1 | SW of Palo Pinto | Palo Pinto | TX | 32.733°N 98.3358°W | 02:20-02:22 | 1.27 mi (2.04 km) | 75 yd (69 m) |
| EF1 | A tornado snapped or uprooted trees and caused damage to metal fencing. | | | | | | |
| EF0 | NE of Noble | Cleveland | OK | 35.179°N 97.297°W | 02:33 | 0.2 mi (0.32 km) | 25 yd (23 m) |
| EF0 | A mobile home had windows broken and shingles ripped off its roof by a brief tornado. | | | | | | |
| EFU | NNW of Asher | Pottawatomie | OK | 35.046°N 96.955°W | 02:47-02:48 | 0.21 mi (0.34 km) | 50 yd (46 m) |
| EFU | A tornado was observed that didn't cause any known damage. | | | | | | |
| EF0 | W of Maud | Pottawatomie | OK | 35.129°N 96.822°W | 03:16-03:21 | 1.7 mi (2.7 km) | 300 yd (270 m) |
| EF0 | Storm chasers observed a tornado that caused minor tree damage. NWS Norman notes that this tornado was "likely stronger than EF0." | | | | | | |

=== May 12 event ===
List of confirmed tornadoes – Friday, May 12, 2023
| EF# | Location | County / parish | State | Start coord. | Time (UTC) | Path length | Max. width |
|---|---|---|---|---|---|---|---|
| EF1 | Southwestern Anselmo | Custer | NE | 41.62°N 99.87°W | 17:34–17:48 | 4.02 mi (6.47 km) | 100 yd (91 m) |
| EF1 | A high-end EF1 tornado clipped the southwestern part of Anselmo, flipping a shed and snapping many trees. A tree branch from one of the trees was driven into the side of a dance hall while another tree branch was driven through a manufactured home's window. Elsewhere, irrigation pivots were flipped, and more trees and a rotted power pole were snapped. | | | | | | |
| EFU | SW of Dunning | Logan | NE | 41.69°N 100.32°W | 17:39-17:40 | 0.09 mi (0.14 km) | 10 yd (9.1 m) |
| EFU | A tornado was recorded in an open field. No damage occurred. | | | | | | |
| EFU | N of Arnold (1st tornado) | Custer | NE | 41.4879°N 100.2°W | 17:42–17:43 | 0.1 mi (0.16 km) | 1 yd (0.91 m) |
| EFU | A brief tornado that caused no damage was captured on video. | | | | | | |
| EFU | N of Arnold (2nd tornado) | Custer | NE | 41.4969°N 100.237°W | 17:47–17:48 | 0.1 mi (0.16 km) | 10 yd (9.1 m) |
| EFU | This tornado touched down in an open field. No damage was observed. | | | | | | |
| EF1 | NE of Greeley Center to SE of Ericson | Greeley | NE | 41.6075°N 98.4044°W | 19:25–19:42 | 13.64 mi (21.95 km) | 200 yd (180 m) |
| EF1 | A multi-vortex wedge tornado flipped and bent irrigation pivots, blew out the windows of two vehicles, scoured gravel off a dirt road, and caused damage to trees and power poles. | | | | | | |
| EF1 | S of Bartlett | Wheeler | NE | 41.8299°N 98.5221°W | 20:11–20:20 | 3.42 mi (5.50 km) | 50 yd (46 m) |
| EF1 | A few trees were snapped and debranched. | | | | | | |
| EFU | NW of Ericson | Wheeler | NE | 41.8337°N 98.7521°W | 20:25–20:33 | 0.1 mi (0.16 km) | 50 yd (46 m) |
| EFU | A tornado was filmed by multiple storm chasers over open country; it did not cause damage. | | | | | | |
| EF2 | S of Chambers | Wheeler, Holt | NE | 42.08°N 98.7°W | 20:55–21:06 | 7.85 mi (12.63 km) | 75 yd (69 m) |
| EF2 | A narrow but strong tornado snapped and uprooted multiple large trees, some of which sustained some debarking. A small farm outbuilding and some grain bins were destroyed as well. | | | | | | |
| EFU | SE of Rosenburg | Platte | NE | 41.59°N 97.69°W | 20:55 | 0.05 mi (0.080 km) | 50 yd (46 m) |
| EFU | Storm chasers reported a brief tornado that caused no damage. | | | | | | |
| EFU | N of Arnold | Custer | NE | 41.5168°N 100.2°W | 21:00–21:01 | 0.1 mi (0.16 km) | 10 yd (9.1 m) |
| EFU | A tornado occurred over open field, causing no obserevable damage. | | | | | | |
| EF1 | S of Closter | Boone | NE | 41.8527°N 97.8754°W | 21:09–21:12 | 1.25 mi (2.01 km) | 150 yd (140 m) |
| EF1 | A machine shed was destroyed, with its debris tossed a few hundred yards north by this high-end EF1 tornado. Several power poles were snapped and a center pivot was flipped as well. | | | | | | |
| EFU | NE of Newman Grove | Madison | NE | 41.7869°N 97.6959°W | 21:22-21:23 | 0.15 mi (0.24 km) | 50 yd (46 m) |
| EFU | A tornado was recorded. No damage occurred. | | | | | | |
| EF1 | Northeastern Pawnee City to SSW of Table Rock | Pawnee | NE | 40.12°N 96.14°W | 21:33–21:41 | 3.05 mi (4.91 km) | 80 yd (73 m) |
| EF1 | A tornado touched down over the Pawnee City baseball fields, damaging an open shelter, fences, and a nearby grain bin. Bleachers were flipped as well. | | | | | | |
| EF1 | N of Leigh to S of Stanton | Stanton | NE | 41.7689°N 97.2567°W | 21:53–22:13 | 8.9 mi (14.3 km) | 200 yd (180 m) |
| EF1 | This high-end EF1 tornado snapped many trees. A home sustained minor damage to its roofing, siding, and windows, while several center pivots and a trailer were flipped. The north side of a large hog barn was torn off as well. | | | | | | |
| EF1 | W of Hadar | Madison, Pierce | NE | 42.073°N 97.5483°W | 22:01–22:08 | 3.11 mi (5.01 km) | 50 yd (46 m) |
| EF1 | A brief tornado caused damage to mature cottonwood trees, snapping multiple trunks. | | | | | | |
| EF2 | ENE of Morse Bluff to NNW of Ames | Dodge | NE | 41.4458°N 96.6991°W | 22:15–22:25 | 5.5 mi (8.9 km) | 800 yd (730 m) |
| EF2 | A low-end EF2 tornado completely destroyed outbuildings and damaged farming equipment at a farmstead. A house on the property had its windows blown out and was shifted slightly off its foundation, and some large grain bins were damaged nearby. Numerous pivot irrigation systems were flipped over, and several large trees and some power lines were downed as well. | | | | | | |
| EF1 | NNE of Leigh to N of Clarkson | Stanton | NE | 41.7561°N 97.2057°W | 22:17–22:28 | 4.98 mi (8.01 km) | 150 yd (140 m) |
| EF1 | A hog barn was completely destroyed by this high-end EF1 tornado, with its debris scattered upwards of 0.5 miles (0.80 km) away. Trees were damaged, and center pivots were flipped as well. | | | | | | |
| EF1 | N of Stanton | Stanton | NE | 41.9892°N 97.2313°W | 22:34–22:38 | 2.79 mi (4.49 km) | 200 yd (180 m) |
| EF1 | Several trees were snapped or uprooted, a home sustained minor roof damage, and a shed was damaged. | | | | | | |
| EF1 | ESE of Stanton to SSW of Pilger | Stanton | NE | 41.91°N 97.06°W | 22:39–22:54 | 5.08 mi (8.18 km) | 300 yd (270 m) |
| EF1 | This intermittent tornado caused damage to trees, three wooden double-posted electrical transmission structures, and a few farm outbuildings. | | | | | | |
| EF0 | WSW of Hooper | Dodge | NE | 41.5713°N 96.6309°W | 22:42–22:44 | 2.49 mi (4.01 km) | 300 yd (270 m) |
| EF0 | A high-end EF0 tornado damaged outbuildings, a block building, the roof of a hog barn, and overturned several center pivot sprinklers. | | | | | | |
| EF2 | W of Hooper to NW of Uehling | Dodge, Burt | NE | 41.6178°N 96.5999°W | 22:46–23:19 | 10.37 mi (16.69 km) | 1,600 yd (1,500 m) |
| EF2 | This large, strong, multi-vortex tornado began just south of US 275, where it damaged a home, power poles, and numerous trees as it entered the Elkhorn River valley, then intensified and produced significant damage to a residence with a porch torn off and large trees heavily damaged. After crossing the Elkhorn River, it caused extensive tree damage and flipped several irrigation pivots before widening significantly and striking multiple farmsteads, where hog barns, machine sheds, and well-built outbuildings were destroyed and farm equipment was heavily damaged. Homes along the path sustained broken windows, roof damage, porches ripped away, and garage doors blown out, while numerous livestock were injured or killed. The tornado grew to nearly a mile wide at times and caused major damage to a large cattle feedlot, destroying large grain bins and barns. The tornado weakened as it crossed into Burt County where it dissipated after damaging trees north of the county line. | | | | | | |
| EF0 | SSW of Wayne | Wayne | NE | 42.1723°N 97.0562°W | 23:14–23:16 | 0.33 mi (0.53 km) | 20 yd (18 m) |
| EF0 | A high-end EF0 tornado hit a farm, doing damage to trees, sheds, and a grain wagon. | | | | | | |
| EF1 | NW of Uehling | Dodge, Burt | NE | 41.7429°N 96.5234°W | 23:14–23:16 | 1.15 mi (1.85 km) | 100 yd (91 m) |
| EF1 | An anticyclonic satellite tornado to the Hooper-Uehling EF2 tornado caused damage to pivot irrigation systems and power lines. | | | | | | |
| EF2 | NNW of Uehling to W of Lyons | Burt | NE | 41.7844°N 96.5295°W | 23:20–23:44 | 11.3 mi (18.2 km) | 1,150 yd (1,050 m) |
| EF2 | This strong tornado struck numerous farmsteads as it moved mostly due north, damaging or destroying many barns, garages, and farm outbuildings, including a couple of well-built outbuildings that were obliterated. Multiple homes sustained damage to their siding, roofs, windows, and garages. Grain bins were damaged or destroyed, and a large metal structure had its garage doors blown out. Many trees were downed along the path, a car was damaged, and a 0.5 miles (0.80 km) span of double-wide wooden electrical transmission poles were snapped as well. Two people were injured. | | | | | | |
| EF0 | NNW of Wayne | Wayne | NE | 42.3109°N 97.0568°W | 23:34–23:35 | 0.73 mi (1.17 km) | 20 yd (18 m) |
| EF0 | A short-lived tornado snapped and uprooted several trees. | | | | | | |
| EF2 | N of Hamlin to WSW of Reserve | Brown | KS | 39.94°N 95.63°W | 00:03–00:06 | 1.48 mi (2.38 km) | 500 yd (460 m) |
| EF2 | This low-end EF2 tornado touched down north of Hamlin, overturning pivot irrigation systems and snapping trees. The tornado reached its peak intensity just before dissipating, completely destroying a well-built farm outbuilding and heavily damaging a trailer. A nearby home also had roof, siding, and window damage as well. | | | | | | |
| EF1 | N of Holton to S of Netawaka | Jackson | KS | 39.49°N 95.73°W | 00:11–00:20 | 3.62 mi (5.83 km) | 50 yd (46 m) |
| EF1 | Trees were damaged and a roof was ripped off an outbuilding. | | | | | | |
| EF0 | N of Reserve, KS to SW of Preston, NE | Brown (KS), Richardson (NE) | KS, NE | 40.0002°N 95.56°W | 00:18–00:21 | 2.28 mi (3.67 km) | 50 yd (46 m) |
| EF0 | A weak tornado caused damage to power lines, the roof of a shed, and the door of an outbuilding. Swirl marks were observed in corn fields as well. | | | | | | |
| EFU | SE of Craig | Burt | NE | 41.7428°N 96.3134°W | 00:23–00:25 | 0.42 mi (0.68 km) | 50 yd (46 m) |
| EFU | A long rope tornado was reported by storm chasers; it did not cause damage. | | | | | | |
| EFU | E of Netawaka | Jackson | KS | 39.6°N 95.67°W | 00:38 | 0.01 mi (0.016 km) | 10 yd (9.1 m) |
| EFU | This brief tornado caused no damage. | | | | | | |
| EFU | E of Tekamah | Burt | NE | 41.7798°N 96.1559°W | 00:43-00:44 | 0.47 mi (0.76 km) | 20 yd (18 m) |
| EFU | A brief tornado was observed over open fields; it did not cause damage. | | | | | | |
| EFU | N of Whiting | Jackson | KS | 39.64°N 95.63°W | 00:49 | 0.01 mi (0.016 km) | 10 yd (9.1 m) |
| EFU | This tornado occurred on the banks of the Delaware River. No damage was observed. | | | | | | |
| EF0 | SW of Tonkawa | Kay | OK | 36.6595°N 97.3355°W | 01:06-01:07 | 0.3 mi (0.48 km) | 10 yd (9.1 m) |
| EF0 | Minor tree damage occurred. | | | | | | |

=== May 13 event ===
List of confirmed tornadoes – Saturday, May 13, 2023
| EF# | Location | County / parish | State | Start coord. | Time (UTC) | Path length | Max. width |
|---|---|---|---|---|---|---|---|
| EF1 | Laguna Heights | Cameron | TX | 26.0799°N 97.2627°W | 09:06–09:08 | 0.45 mi (0.72 km) | 200 yd (180 m) |
| EF1 | 1 death – This high-end EF1 tornado touched down in Laguna Heights and completely destroyed least six poorly built manufactured homes, one of which collapsed and killed a man inside. Several other mobile homes in town were heavily damaged, and many more were damaged to a lesser degree. A local business lost part of its second story, at least 10 other residences and buildings had the majority of their roof decking ripped off, dozens of trees were snapped or uprooted, two wooden power poles were bent, and fences were toppled. Some industrial buildings were also heavily damaged, and roofing material was left wrapped around power lines. Eleven people were injured. | | | | | | |
| EFU | N of Schaller | Buena Vista | IA | 42.5696°N 95.2998°W | 18:21-18:22 | 0.01 mi (0.016 km) | 10 yd (9.1 m) |
| EFU | A storm chaser captured a tornado briefly touch down in an open field. No damage occurred. | | | | | | |
| EF0 | ENE of Beech to W of Pleasantville | Warren, Marion | IA | 41.3818°N 93.3371°W | 18:22–18:26 | 1.07 mi (1.72 km) | 40 yd (37 m) |
| EF0 | Some minor tree damage occurred. | | | | | | |
| EFU | NE of Schaller | Sac | IA | 42.5215°N 95.2519°W | 18:36–18:37 | 0.28 mi (0.45 km) | 30 yd (27 m) |
| EFU | A brief tornado was captured on video by a storm chaser as it remained over open farm fields, causing no damage. | | | | | | |
| EFU | S of Storm Lake | Buena Vista | IA | 42.5613°N 95.2201°W | 18:50–18:55 | 0.99 mi (1.59 km) | 75 yd (69 m) |
| EFU | Storm chasers reported a tornado over open fields. It did not cause damage. | | | | | | |
| EFU | ENE of Gallup | McKinley | NM | 35.55°N 108.67°W | 19:16-19:21 | 0.51 mi (0.82 km) | 20 yd (18 m) |
| EFU | A video showed a brief landspout tornado that caused no damage. | | | | | | |
| EFU | NNW of Boody | Macon | IL | 39.78°N 89.06°W | 19:37-19:38 | 0.45 mi (0.72 km) | 10 yd (9.1 m) |
| EFU | A landspout remained over an open field. | | | | | | |
| EF0 | W of Chickasha | Grady | OK | 35.057°N 97.979°W | 20:18 | 0.1 mi (0.16 km) | 20 yd (18 m) |
| EF0 | Storm chasers observed a tornado. No damage was reported. | | | | | | |
| EFU | ENE of Knoxville | Marion | IA | 41.3311°N 93.0402°W | 20:23–20:25 | 0.52 mi (0.84 km) | 30 yd (27 m) |
| EFU | A brief tornado was captured and reported by a storm chaser. No damage occurred. | | | | | | |
| EF0 | NE of Knoxville to NW of Harvey | Marion | IA | 41.348°N 92.9993°W | 20:29–20:31 | 0.54 mi (0.87 km) | 50 yd (46 m) |
| EF0 | A brief tornado produced some damage to an outbuilding and a hoop building. | | | | | | |
| EF0 | NW of Harvey | Marion | IA | 41.3267°N 92.9586°W | 20:52–20:54 | 0.66 mi (1.06 km) | 40 yd (37 m) |
| EF0 | Storm chasers observed a tornado that caused minor tree damage. | | | | | | |
| EFU | WNW of Fonda | Pocahontas | IA | 42.5964°N 94.9017°W | 21:15–21:19 | 1.17 mi (1.88 km) | 30 yd (27 m) |
| EFU | An intermittent tornado occurred but did not cause observable damage. | | | | | | |
| EF0 | ENE of Newell to W of Varina | Buena Vista | IA | 42.6258°N 94.9448°W | 21:17–21:24 | 1.96 mi (3.15 km) | 75 yd (69 m) |
| EF0 | A barn lost a few shingles, and a few rotted trees and branches were downed. | | | | | | |
| EFU | SW of Fonda | Calhoun | IA | 42.5506°N 94.8887°W | 21:51–21:53 | 0.62 mi (1.00 km) | 30 yd (27 m) |
| EFU | A tornado was reported by a storm chaser. No damage occurred. | | | | | | |
| EFU | E of Scranton | Greene | IA | 42.0118°N 94.527°W | 22:18–22:20 | 0.42 mi (0.68 km) | 40 yd (37 m) |
| EFU | A brief tornado remained over open fields as it was filmed by a storm chaser. No damage occurred. | | | | | | |
| EFU | S of Pleasantville | Marion | IA | 41.3048°N 93.2755°W | 23:20–23:21 | 0.31 mi (0.50 km) | 30 yd (27 m) |
| EFU | A brief tornado was reported by a storm chaser. No damage occurred. | | | | | | |
| EF0 | E of Pomeroy | Calhoun, Pocahontas | IA | 42.5523°N 94.6392°W | 23:22-23:27 | 1.35 mi (2.17 km) | 50 yd (46 m) |
| EF0 | A weak tornado damaged grain bins and an outbuilding. | | | | | | |
| EFU | S of Ware | Pocahontas | IA | 42.7573°N 94.7636°W | 23:26–23:28 | 0.47 mi (0.76 km) | 40 yd (37 m) |
| EFU | A tornado was caught on video; no damage was found. | | | | | | |
| EF0 | W of Knoxville | Marion | IA | 41.3339°N 93.2069°W | 23:52–23:55 | 0.92 mi (1.48 km) | 50 yd (46 m) |
| EF0 | Some tree damage occurred. | | | | | | |
| EFU | SSW of Pocahontas | Pocahontas | IA | 42.6804°N 94.7014°W | 23:52-23:54 | 0.48 mi (0.77 km) | 30 yd (27 m) |
| EFU | A brief tornado was sighted over open farmland by law enforcement. No damage was reported. | | | | | | |
| EFU | NE of Havelock | Pocahontas | IA | 42.8477°N 94.6731°W | 00:22-00:24 | 0.63 mi (1.01 km) | 30 yd (27 m) |
| EFU | A brief tornado remained over open farmland. No damage was reported. | | | | | | |

=== May 15 event ===
List of confirmed tornadoes – Monday, May 15, 2023
| EF# | Location | County / parish | State | Start coord. | Time (UTC) | Path length | Max. width |
|---|---|---|---|---|---|---|---|
| EF0 | N of Fair Grove | Greene | MO | 37.39°N 93.14°W | 20:41–20:46 | 1.49 mi (2.40 km) | 75 yd (69 m) |
| EF0 | This intermittent tornado collapsed one outbuilding and caused damage to a second. Sheet metal from one outbuilding was tossed about 200 yards (180 m). A home sustained minor damage to its siding, and trees branches were snapped. | | | | | | |
| EF0 | Dilley | Frio | TX | 28.6761°N 99.1888°W | 21:50–21:52 | 0.71 mi (1.14 km) | 50 yd (46 m) |
| EF0 | A brief tornado caused minor damage to the roofs of buildings and to trees in Dilley. | | | | | | |

=== May 16 event ===
List of confirmed tornadoes – Tuesday, May 16, 2023
| EF# | Location | County / parish | State | Start coord. | Time (UTC) | Path length | Max. width |
|---|---|---|---|---|---|---|---|
| EF1 | NE of Foraker | Magoffin | KY | 37.6650°N 83.1230°W | 20:46–20:48 | 0.67 mi (1.08 km) | 150 yd (140 m) |
| EF1 | Several dozen trees were snapped or uprooted along a hillside as a result of this brief tornado. Some roofing material was removed from a barn as well. | | | | | | |
| EF1 | N of Ben Hur | Lee | VA | 36.74°N 83.09°W | 21:17–21:18 | 0.15 mi (0.24 km) | 50 yd (46 m) |
| EF1 | Small tree limbs were broken by this very brief tornado. | | | | | | |
| EF1 | NNW of Stickleyville | Lee | VA | 36.72°N 82.93°W | 21:27–21:28 | 0.55 mi (0.89 km) | 30 yd (27 m) |
| EF1 | A brief tornado uprooted trees and snapped branches. | | | | | | |
| EF1 | S of Duffield | Scott | VA | 36.7045°N 82.7961°W | 21:33–21:34 | 0.56 mi (0.90 km) | 30 yd (27 m) |
| EF1 | A few trees were uprooted. | | | | | | |

=== May 18 event ===
List of confirmed tornadoes – Thursday, May 18, 2023
| EF# | Location | County / parish | State | Start coord. | Time (UTC) | Path length | Max. width |
|---|---|---|---|---|---|---|---|
| EFU | NE of Laramie | Albany | WY | 41.3501°N 105.5528°W | 17:28–17:42 | 3 mi (4.8 km) | 100 yd (91 m) |
| EFU | A landspout tornado was photographed and filmed over open country; it did not cause damage. | | | | | | |
| EF1 | E of St. Francis | Carson | TX | 35.2786°N 101.5409°W | 03:02–03:03 | 0.09 mi (0.14 km) | 25 yd (23 m) |
| EF1 | A very brief tornado snapped tree limbs, tossed a dumpster several yards, collapsed a garage, and overturned some horse trailers. | | | | | | |

=== May 19 event ===
List of confirmed tornadoes – Friday, May 19, 2023
| EF# | Location | County / parish | State | Start coord. | Time (UTC) | Path length | Max. width |
|---|---|---|---|---|---|---|---|
| EF0 | S of Geary | Blaine | OK | 35.58°N 98.328°W | 17:35 | 0.1 mi (0.16 km) | 10 yd (9.1 m) |
| EF0 | A storm chaser observed a landspout tornado. No damage occurred. | | | | | | |

=== May 22 event ===
List of confirmed tornadoes – Monday, May 22, 2023
| EF# | Location | County / parish | State | Start coord. | Time (UTC) | Path length | Max. width |
|---|---|---|---|---|---|---|---|
| EFU | WSW of Sand | Gaines | TX | 32.61°N 102.34°W | 00:21-00:31 | 7.5 mi (12.1 km) | 25 yd (23 m) |
| EFU | A landspout tornado was reported. No damage occurred. | | | | | | |

=== May 23 event ===
List of confirmed tornadoes – Tuesday, May 23, 2023
| EF# | Location | County / parish | State | Start coord. | Time (UTC) | Path length | Max. width |
|---|---|---|---|---|---|---|---|
| EFU | S of Texico | Curry | NM | 34.347°N 103.059°W | 22:57-23:01 | 0.5 mi (0.80 km) | 20 yd (18 m) |
| EFU | An off-duty NWS employee reported a landspout. No damage occurred. | | | | | | |
| EFU | NE of Dimmitt | Castro | NM | 34.561°N 102.293°W | 23:55-23:58 | Unknown | Unknown |
| EFU | A brief landspout was observed. | | | | | | |
| EF2 | ESE of Anson | Jones | TX | 32.723°N 99.789°W | 02:13–02:47 | 4.61 mi (7.42 km) | 700 yd (640 m) |
| EF2 | This high-end EF2 tornado rolled and completely destroyed two manufactured homes, including one with hurricane straps that failed. A small house sustained significant roof damage and had its enclosed porch detached from the main structure as well. The tornado was fully absorbed into a larger area of straight-line winds within the bow echo at the end of its path, causing it to dissipate. Two people were injured. | | | | | | |

=== May 24 event ===
List of confirmed tornadoes – Wednesday, May 24, 2023
| EF# | Location | County / parish | State | Start coord. | Time (UTC) | Path length | Max. width |
|---|---|---|---|---|---|---|---|
| EF1 | SE of Halleck | Elko | NV | 40.89°N 115.33°W | 22:00–22:10 | 1.2 mi (1.9 km) | 500 yd (460 m) |
| EF1 | A low-end EF1 tornado shifted a poorly anchored outbuilding off its foundation, caused minor roof damage to other outbuildings, snapped tree branches, and matted down or pushed over sagebrush. | | | | | | |
| EFU | Cheyenne | Laramie | WY | 41.1564°N 104.8157°W | 23:35–23:38 | 0.1 mi (0.16 km) | 50 yd (46 m) |
| EFU | A brief landspout tornado touched down in the middle of Cheyenne Regional Airport. It remained over the airfield and did not cause damage. | | | | | | |
| EF0 | SW of Karval | Lincoln | CO | 38.56°N 103.7°W | 00:26-00:27 | 0.01 mi (0.016 km) | 25 yd (23 m) |
| EF0 | A tornado touched down briefly, causing no damage. | | | | | | |
| EFU | SSW of Wheatland to W of Grady | Curry | NM | 34.86°N 103.39°W | 00:49–00:54 | 2.57 mi (4.14 km) | 10 yd (9.1 m) |
| EFU | Storm chasers reported a tornado over rural areas. It did not cause damage. | | | | | | |
| EFU | NE of Grady to W of Broadview | Curry | NM | 34.84°N 103.27°W | 01:00–01:03 | 1.71 mi (2.75 km) | 20 yd (18 m) |
| EFU | A tornado remained over open country, causing no damage. | | | | | | |

=== May 25 event ===
List of confirmed tornadoes – Thursday, May 25, 2023
| EF# | Location | County / parish | State | Start coord. | Time (UTC) | Path length | Max. width |
|---|---|---|---|---|---|---|---|
| EF0 | S of Richmond West | Miami-Dade | FL | 25.5877°N 80.4336°W | 17:20–17:22 | 0.6 mi (0.97 km) | 75 yd (69 m) |
| EF0 | Several trees were snapped or uprooted, and a semi-truck was knocked over on its side, injuring the driver. | | | | | | |

=== May 26 event ===
List of confirmed tornadoes – Friday, May 26, 2023
| EF# | Location | County / parish | State | Start coord. | Time (UTC) | Path length | Max. width |
|---|---|---|---|---|---|---|---|
| EF0 | E of Almo | Cassia | ID | 42.1°N 113.4935°W | 20:35-20:45 | 0.2 mi (0.32 km) | 10 yd (9.1 m) |
| EF0 | This tornado was photographed over open fields. | | | | | | |
| EFU | ESE of Valentine (1st tornado) | Jeff Davis | TX | 30.51°N 104.26°W | 21:08-21:09 | 1 mi (1.6 km) | 50 yd (46 m) |
| EFU | A landspout tornado caused no damage occurred. | | | | | | |
| EFU | ESE of Valentine (2nd tornado) | Jeff Davis | TX | 30.51°N 104.28°W | 21:10 | 0.1 mi (0.16 km) | 50 yd (46 m) |
| EFU | A very brief landspout lasted only about twenty seconds and remained over open country. | | | | | | |
| EF0 | NW of Mae | Grant | WA | 47.1632°N 119.4396°W | 21:15-21:50 | 0.37 mi (0.60 km) | 25 yd (23 m) |
| EF0 | A landspout tornado was observed. No damage occurred. | | | | | | |
| EFU | N of Yoder | El Paso | CO | 38.93°N 104.23°W | 22:29-22:30 | 0.94 mi (1.51 km) | 1 yd (0.91 m) |
| EFU | This brief tornado remained over open land, causing no damage. | | | | | | |
| EFU | W of Snyder | Morgan | CO | 40.33°N 103.6°W | 22:53-22:54 | 0.01 mi (0.016 km) | 25 yd (23 m) |
| EFU | A tornado touched down in an open field. No damage was observed. | | | | | | |
| EFU | S of Encino | Torrance | NM | 34.64°N 105.46°W | 23:28-23:40 | 1.7 mi (2.7 km) | 20 yd (18 m) |
| EFU | A rope tornado was reported by a storm spotter. | | | | | | |
| EFU | N of Anton | Washington | CO | 39.84°N 103.22°W | 00:44-00:45 | 0.01 mi (0.016 km) | 25 yd (23 m) |
| EFU | A tornado touched down in an open field, causing no damage. | | | | | | |
| EF0 | NNE of Star | Ada | ID | 43.71°N 116.47°W | 00:45-01:45 | 0.95 mi (1.53 km) | 3 yd (2.7 m) |
| EF0 | Several photos were taken of a landspout tornado occurring over open land. No damage was reported. | | | | | | |

=== May 27 event ===
List of confirmed tornadoes – Saturday, May 27, 2023
| EF# | Location | County / parish | State | Start coord. | Time (UTC) | Path length | Max. width |
|---|---|---|---|---|---|---|---|
| EFU | W of Esterbrook | Converse | WY | 42.36°N 105.5°W | 20:17–20:25 | 7.37 mi (11.86 km) | 100 yd (91 m) |
| EFU | This tornado was photographed as it remained over mountainous land, causing no damage. | | | | | | |
| EFU | SW of Cheyenne | Laramie | WY | 41.0673°N 104.9164°W | 22:02–22:06 | 0.5 mi (0.80 km) | 50 yd (46 m) |
| EFU | A landspout tornado occurred over open land. No damage occurred. | | | | | | |
| EF0 | SSW of Grand View | Owyhee | ID | 42.94°N 116.11°W | 00:01-00:07 | 0.8 mi (1.3 km) | 30 yd (27 m) |
| EF0 | A landspout occurred over open rangeland. | | | | | | |
| EFU | NW of Bushnell | Kimball | NE | 41.26°N 103.93°W | 00:06 | 0.5 mi (0.80 km) | 50 yd (46 m) |
| EFU | Trained weather spotters observed a brief tornado that caused no damage. | | | | | | |
| EFU | SE of Crossroads | Lea | NM | 33.43°N 103.23°W | 00:10-00:12 | 1 mi (1.6 km) | 50 yd (46 m) |
| EFU | Trained spotter video showed a tornado briefly touching down in an open field. No damage was reported. | | | | | | |
| EFU | N of McClave | Kiowa | CO | 38.31°N 102.81°W | 00:29-00:30 | 0.94 mi (1.51 km) | 1 yd (0.91 m) |
| EFU | A brief ground circulation occurred beneath a funnel cloud. No damage occurred. | | | | | | |
| EF0 | SW of Grand View | Owyhee | ID | 42.96°N 116.14°W | 00:30-00:35 | 0.9 mi (1.4 km) | 30 yd (27 m) |
| EF0 | A landspout remained over open country. | | | | | | |
| EFU | NE of Tatum | Lea | NM | 33.4°N 103.14°W | 00:38-00:42 | 3.5 mi (5.6 km) | 50 yd (46 m) |
| EFU | A cone tornado occurred over open fields. | | | | | | |
| EF0 | W of Grand View | Owyhee | ID | 42.99°N 116.18°W | 00:55-01:01 | 0.8 mi (1.3 km) | 30 yd (27 m) |
| EF0 | This landspout was observed as it stayed over rural lands. | | | | | | |
| EFU | NW of Plains | Yoakum | TX | 33.2174°N 102.8557°W | 01:26-01:28 | 0.71 mi (1.14 km) | 30 yd (27 m) |
| EFU | A brief tornado occurred over open land. No damage was reported. | | | | | | |

=== May 28 event ===
List of confirmed tornadoes – Sunday, May 28, 2023
| EF# | Location | County / parish | State | Start coord. | Time (UTC) | Path length | Max. width |
|---|---|---|---|---|---|---|---|
| EFU | ENE of Tulia | Swisher | TX | 34.5852°N 101.5781°W | 22:09-22:10 | 0.37 mi (0.60 km) | 30 yd (27 m) |
| EFU | A video on social media showed a brief tornado over an open field. No damage was reported. | | | | | | |
| EFU | SE of Stratford | Sherman | TX | 36.2°N 101.91°W | 00:48-00:56 | 0.89 mi (1.43 km) | 20 yd (18 m) |
| EFU | A tornado was filmed and no damage was found. | | | | | | |

=== May 30 event ===
List of confirmed tornadoes – Tuesday, May 30, 2023
| EF# | Location | County / parish | State | Start coord. | Time (UTC) | Path length | Max. width |
|---|---|---|---|---|---|---|---|
| EF0 | S of Wiley to N of Lamar | Prowers | CO | 38.1402°N 102.79°W | 22:00-22:10 | 4.61 mi (7.42 km) | 20 yd (18 m) |
| EF0 | A landspout ripped some siding off the side of a house. | | | | | | |

=== May 31 event ===
List of confirmed tornadoes – Wedneday, May 31, 2023
| EF# | Location | County / parish | State | Start coord. | Time (UTC) | Path length | Max. width |
|---|---|---|---|---|---|---|---|
| EFU | SSW of Hartland | McHenry | IL | 42.32°N 88.5399°W | 20:50–20:53 | 0.6 mi (0.97 km) | 25 yd (23 m) |
| EFU | A brief landspout tornado was observed over a field. It did not cause damage. | | | | | | |
| EFU | ESE of Corona | Lincoln | NM | 34.08°N 105.1°W | 21:42-21:52 | 2.9 mi (4.7 km) | 25 yd (23 m) |
| EFU | A storm chaser observed a tornado that caused no damage. | | | | | | |
| EFU | N of Vaughn | Guadalupe | NM | 34.64°N 105.21°W | 22:52-22:9 | 0.4 mi (0.64 km) | 20 yd (18 m) |
| EFU | A storm chaser observed a tornado. It did not cause damage. | | | | | | |

== See also ==
- Tornadoes of 2023
- List of United States tornadoes in March 2023
- List of United States tornadoes in June 2023
