= National Register of Historic Places listings in Rutherford County, Tennessee =

Location of Rutherford County in Tennessee

This is a list of the National Register of Historic Places listings in Rutherford County, Tennessee.

This is intended to be a complete list of the properties and districts on the National Register of Historic Places in Rutherford County, Tennessee, United States. Latitude and longitude coordinates are provided for many National Register properties and districts; these locations may be seen together in a map.

There are 48 properties and districts listed on the National Register in the county, and six former listings.

Contents: Counties in Tennessee
Anderson – Bedford – Benton – Bledsoe – Blount – Bradley – Campbell – Cannon – Carroll – Carter – Cheatham – Chester – Claiborne – Clay – Cocke – Coffee – Crockett – Cumberland – Davidson – Decatur – DeKalb – Dickson – Dyer – Fayette – Fentress – Franklin – Gibson – Giles – Grainger – Greene – Grundy – Hamblen – Hamilton – Hancock – Hardeman – Hardin – Hawkins – Haywood – Henderson – Henry – Hickman – Houston – Humphreys – Jackson – Jefferson – Johnson – Knox – Lake – Lauderdale – Lawrence – Lewis – Lincoln – Loudon – Macon – Madison – Marion – Marshall – Maury – McMinn – McNairy – Meigs – Monroe – Montgomery – Moore – Morgan – Obion – Overton – Perry – Pickett – Polk – Putnam – Rhea – Roane – Robertson – Rutherford – Scott – Sequatchie – Sevier – Shelby – Smith – Stewart – Sullivan – Sumner – Tipton – Trousdale – Unicoi – Union – Van Buren – Warren – Washington – Wayne – Weakley – White – Williamson – Wilson

This National Park Service list is complete through NPS recent listings posted March 28, 2025.

== Current listings ==
	Name on the Register	Image	Date listed	Location	City or town	Description
1	Allen Chapel A.M.E. Church	Allen Chapel A.M.E. Church	March 31, 1995 (#95000291)	224 S. Maney Ave. 35°50′38″N 86°23′14″W	Murfreesboro	
2	Arnold-Harrell House	Arnold-Harrell House	March 27, 1992 (#92000145)	1710 E. Main St. 35°50′26″N 86°21′51″W	Murfreesboro	
3	Beesley Primitive Baptist Church	Beesley Primitive Baptist Church	April 8, 1999 (#99000397)	461 Beesley Rd. 35°51′11″N 86°29′51″W	Murfreesboro	
4	Benevolent Cemetery		May 16, 2022 (#100007730)	Park Ave. 35°49′54″N 86°23′51″W	Murfreesboro	
5	Thomas C. Black House	Thomas C. Black House	July 5, 1996 (#96000231)	4431 Lebanon Rd. 35°55′38″N 86°22′58″W	Murfreesboro	
6	Boxwood	Boxwood	October 25, 1984 (#84000139)	Old Salem Pike; 35°48′37″N 86°27′09″W	Murfreesboro	
7	Bradley Academy	Bradley Academy	June 14, 1990 (#90000914)	415 S. Academy St. 35°50′31″N 86°23′19″W	Murfreesboro	School established 1811; current building completed in 1917
8	Caff-E-Hill Farm		April 14, 1995 (#95000412)	3783 Cripple Creek Rd. 35°46′42″N 86°11′53″W	Readyville	
9	Cemetery School	Cemetery School	November 2, 2022 (#100008375)	Mt. Olive Rd. 35°53′09″N 86°26′27″W	Murfreesboro	
10	Childress-Ray House	Childress-Ray House	December 27, 1979 (#79002458)	225 N. Academy St. 35°50′51″N 86°23′19″W	Murfreesboro	Originally built 1847; remodeled 1874
11	Collier-Crichlow House	Collier-Crichlow House	July 16, 1973 (#73001822)	511 E. Main St. 35°50′42″N 86°22′18″W	Murfreesboro	Second Empire-style house built in 1879.
12	Sam Davis House	Sam Davis House	December 23, 1969 (#69000181)	Northeast of Smyrna off State Route 102; 35°59′21″N 86°29′56″W	Smyrna	
13	Dement House	Dement House	June 26, 1986 (#86001379)	7421 Cainsville Pike; 35°55′56″N 86°16′01″W	Lascassas	
14	East Main Street Historic District	East Main Street Historic District	July 11, 1985 (#85001516)	Roughly E. Main, E. Lytle, College, University, and E. Vine Sts. 35°50′42″N 86°22′50″W	Murfreesboro	
15	Elmwood		October 15, 1973 (#73001823)	Northwest of Murfreesboro off U.S. Routes 41/70S; also 5722 Old Nashville Highway; 35°53′46″N 86°27′28″W	Murfreesboro	5722 Old Nashville Highway represents a boundary increase of July 3, 2007
16	First Presbyterian Church	First Presbyterian Church	June 24, 1993 (#93000561)	210 N. Spring St. 35°50′49″N 86°23′23″W	Murfreesboro	
17	Fortress Rosecrans Site	Fortress Rosecrans Site	June 7, 1974 (#74001926)	Old Fort Parkway west of downtown Murfreesboro at the Stones River; 35°51′12″N 86°24′41″W	Murfreesboro	
18	Logan Henderson Farm	Logan Henderson Farm	September 25, 2003 (#03000971)	3600 Manchester Pike; 35°47′27″N 86°21′25″W	Murfreesboro	
19	Idler's Retreat	Idler's Retreat	May 19, 2004 (#04000475)	112 Oak St. 35°59′15″N 86°30′55″W	Smyrna	
20	Jarman Farm	Jarman Farm	July 6, 1987 (#87001368)	Cainsville Pike; 35°57′46″N 86°15′30″W	Lascassas	
21	Enoch H. Jones House	Enoch H. Jones House	August 25, 1995 (#95001043)	6339 Halls Hill Pike; 35°51′39″N 86°13′04″W	Murfreesboro	
22	William B. Jordan Farm	William B. Jordan Farm	July 13, 1992 (#92000825)	2665 Taylor Ln. 35°46′03″N 86°36′10″W	Eagleville	
23	Landsberger-Gerhardt House	Landsberger-Gerhardt House	December 13, 1993 (#93001397)	435 N. Spring St. 35°51′00″N 86°23′21″W	Murfreesboro	
24	Uncle Dave Macon House	Uncle Dave Macon House	November 15, 1973 (#73001827)	West of Readyville on U.S. Route 70S; 35°49′27″N 86°14′27″W	Readyville	Home of banjoist and showman Uncle Dave Macon
25	Marymont	Marymont	October 30, 1973 (#73001824)	Southwest of Murfreesboro, off State Route 99 on Rucker Lane; 35°49′12″N 86°28′45″W	Murfreesboro	
26	William Harrison McCord House	William Harrison McCord House	December 20, 1984 (#84001121)	475 N. Main St. 35°44′46″N 86°39′06″W	Eagleville	
27	McGill – Becton – Cates Family Farm	McGill – Becton – Cates Family Farm	November 9, 2005 (#05001220)	2432 Cripple Creek Rd. 35°47′03″N 86°12′41″W	Readyville	
28	Middle Tennessee State Teachers College Training School	Middle Tennessee State Teachers College Training School	January 4, 1993 (#92001731)	923 E. Lytle St. 35°50′49″N 86°22′31″W	Murfreesboro	
29	Morgan House	Morgan House	December 27, 1979 (#79002457)	Southwest of Christiana; 35°39′22″N 86°27′27″W	Christiana	
30	Murfreesboro Veterans Administration Hospital Historic District	Murfreesboro Veterans Administration Hospital Historic District	March 12, 2012 (#12000119)	3400 Lebanon Pike; 35°55′00″N 86°22′41″W	Murfreesboro	United States Second Generation Veterans Hospitals Multiple Property Submission
31	Murray Farm	Murray Farm	July 31, 1991 (#91000980)	9409 Bradyville Rd. 35°45′21″N 86°15′49″W	Readyville	
32	North Maney Avenue Historic District		April 4, 1985 (#85000709)	Roughly bounded by N. Maney and N. Highland Aves., E. College St., and N. Academy Ave. 35°50′55″N 86°23′10″W	Murfreesboro	
33	Oaklands	Oaklands	February 26, 1970 (#70000616)	900 N. Maney Ave. 35°51′21″N 86°23′06″W	Murfreesboro	
34	Old First Presbyterian Church and Old City Cemetery	Old First Presbyterian Church and Old City Cemetery	March 12, 2012 (#12000120)	390 E. Vine St. 35°50′37″N 86°23′16″W	Murfreesboro	Cemetery dating to the 1820s and site of the original First Presbyterian Church in Murfreesboro which was destroyed by Union Army troops during the American Civil War
35	Gen. Joseph B. Palmer House	Gen. Joseph B. Palmer House	September 20, 1973 (#73001825)	434 E. Main St. 35°50′43″N 86°23′07″W	Murfreesboro	Built in 1869 by Confederate general Joseph B. Palmer (1825–1890)
36	Providence Primitive Baptist Church	Providence Primitive Baptist Church	November 8, 2000 (#00001357)	256 Central Valley Rd. 35°56′19″N 86°22′51″W	Walterhill	
37	Charles Ready House	Charles Ready House	July 2, 1973 (#73001828)	On U.S. Route 70S; 35°49′45″N 86°10′47″W	Readyville	Known as "The Corners," built in 1829 by Charles Ready
38	Riverside Farm	Riverside Farm	December 12, 2006 (#06001132)	1218 W. Jefferson Pike; 35°57′55″N 86°23′21″W	Walterhill	
39	Rockvale Store	Rockvale Store	September 14, 1995 (#95001114)	8964 Rockvale Rd. 35°45′27″N 86°31′53″W	Rockvale	
40	Benjamine Rucker House	Benjamine Rucker House	February 28, 1991 (#91000223)	3978 Betty Ford Rd. 35°55′14″N 86°19′51″W	Compton	
41	Rutherford County Courthouse	Rutherford County Courthouse	July 16, 1973 (#73001826)	Public Square; 35°50′46″N 86°23′31″W	Murfreesboro	
42	Rutherford Health Department	Rutherford Health Department	July 24, 1992 (#92000960)	303 N. Church St. 35°50′54″N 86°23′27″W	Murfreesboro	
43	Absalom Scales House	Absalom Scales House	October 30, 1973 (#73001821)	432 Rocky Glade Rd. 35°46′27″N 86°38′22″W	Eagleville	
44	Searcy – Matthews – Tarpley Farm	Searcy – Matthews – Tarpley Farm	July 14, 2011 (#11000459)	455 W. Jefferson Pike; 35°57′08″N 86°23′07″W	Walterhill	Historic Family Farms in Middle Tennessee MPS
45	Robert Andrew Smith Farm		January 4, 1993 (#92001712)	2568 Armstrong Valley Rd. 35°46′06″N 86°28′45″W	Murfreesboro	
46	John C. Spence House	John C. Spence House	August 23, 2004 (#04000302)	503 N. Maple St. 35°51′10″N 86°23′32″W	Murfreesboro	
47	Stones River National Battlefield	Stones River National Battlefield	October 15, 1966 (#66000075)	3 miles (4.8 km) northwest of Murfreesboro on U.S. Route 41; 35°52′24″N 86°25′17″W	Murfreesboro	Boundary increase approved February 22, 2022
48	Walter Hill Hydroelectric Station	Walter Hill Hydroelectric Station	November 7, 1990 (#90001660)	U.S. Route 231 at the Stones River; 35°56′37″N 86°22′37″W	Murfreesboro	

== Former listings ==
Five other properties have previously been listed, but were removed:

	Name on the Register	Image	Date listed	Date removed	Location	City or town	Description
1	Brown's Mill		December 29, 1978 (#78002628)	July 30, 2002	SE of Lascassas on Brown's Mill Road	Lascassas	Collapsed in June, 1991.
2	Collier-Lane-Crichlow House	Collier-Lane-Crichlow House	August 23, 1978 (#78002629)	October 23, 2023	500 N. Spring St. 35°51′00″N 86°23′21″W	Murfreesboro	Commonly called the "House of Mayors"; built in 1850. Demolished 2023.
3	Crichlow Grammar School and E. C. Cox Memorial Gym		December 17, 1992 (#92001685)	July 30, 2002	400 N. Maple St. and 105 Olive St.	Murfreesboro	Demolished on September 7, 2000.
4	Hiram Jenkins House		June 16, 1989 (#89000504)	November 8, 2006	1556 Gresham Lane	Murfreesboro	Demolished on June 12, 2006.
5	Ridley's Landing		July 16, 1973 (#73001829)	July 24, 2008	N of Smyrna on Jones Mill Rd., at Stones River	Smyrna vicinity	
6	Thomas Williamson House		June 21, 1996 (#96000687)	November 19, 2014	2263 Little Rock Rd. 35°44′58″N 86°37′17″W	Eagleville	

== See also ==
- List of National Historic Landmarks in Tennessee
- National Register of Historic Places listings in Tennessee
