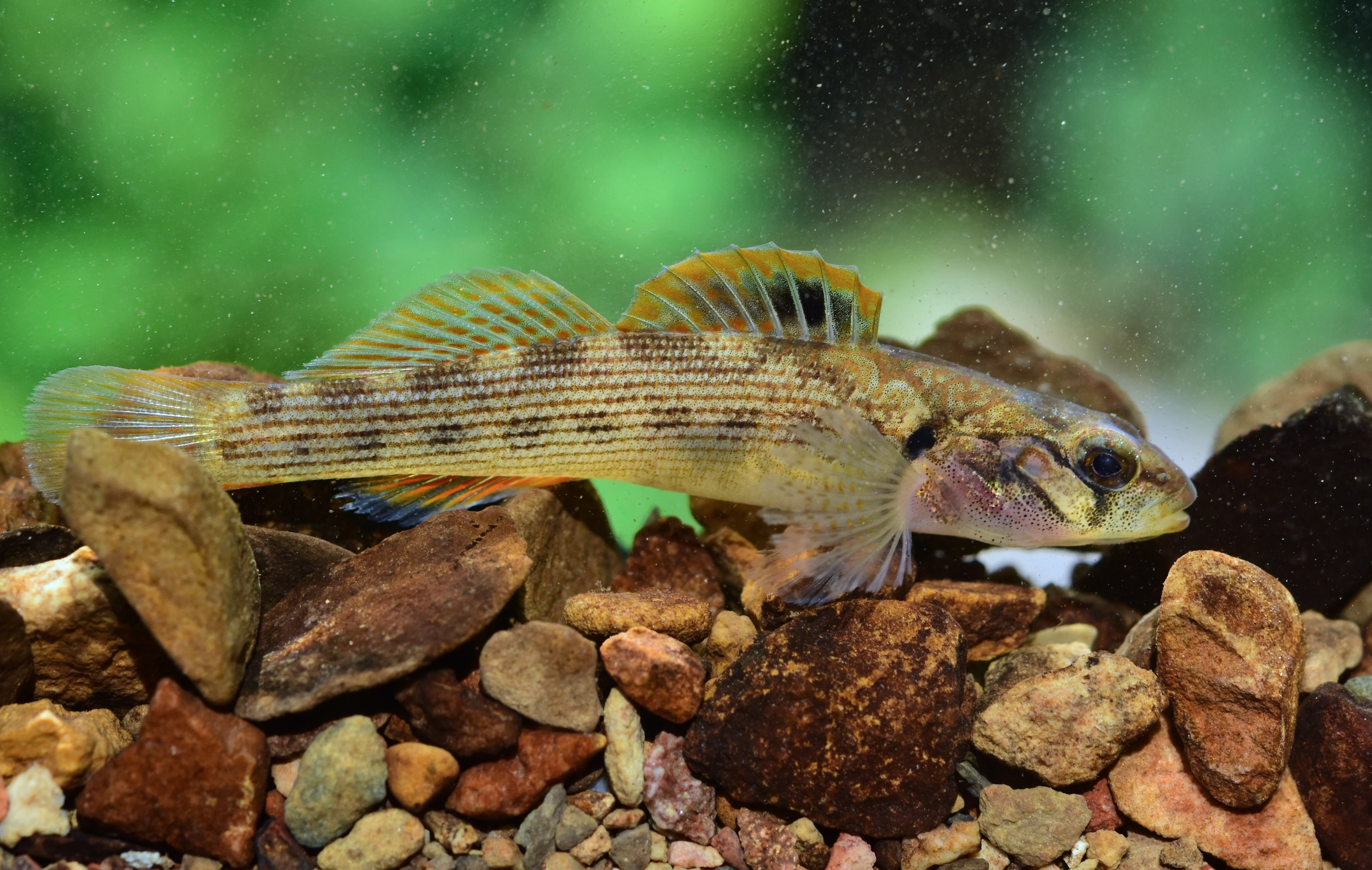

Conservation status
- Least Concern (IUCN 3.1)

Scientific classification
- Kingdom: Animalia
- Phylum: Chordata
- Class: Actinopterygii
- Order: Perciformes
- Family: Percidae
- Genus: Etheostoma
- Species: E. derivativum

Binomial name
- Etheostoma derivativum Page, Hardman & Near, 2003

= Stone darter =

Species of fish

The stone darter (Etheostoma derivativum) is a species of freshwater ray-finned fish, a darter from the subfamily Etheostomatinae, part of the family Percidae, which also contains the perches, ruffes and pikeperches. It is endemic to the eastern United States.

== Geographic distribution ==
The stone darter is found within the lower Cumberland River drainage, Southern Kentucky, and North-Central Tennessee. Specimens have been collected in Todd County and Logan County in Kentucky and in the West Fork Stones River in Tennessee. Since the fish is found in the west fork of Stones River, it was given the common name stone darter. Collections were also made in Whites Creek, Marrowbone Creek, Sycamore Creek, Louise Creek, Harpeth River, and Red River. It is native to these waters and is found year-round. The distribution is very small because this species has only just been recognized as a divergent species from Etheostoma virgatum in the past 10 years. The stone darter inhabits shallow pools, the bases and margins of riffles, and/or the margins of rocky bands over gravel and sand with slab rocks present. Within the Cumberland River system, species in the subgenus Catonotus are separated and live in one-species segments which create an almost totally nonoverlapping mosaic in the Cumberland, Tennessee, and Green River systems.

== Ecology ==
Habitat includes rocky pools of creeks and small to medium rivers; small bedrock creeks (under flat rocks), gravel bottom pools and gentle riffles of larger streams (small to medium rivers). In larger streams, this darter often is associated with emergent vegetation or occurs under tree roots or undercut banks; it also occurs in slower riffles and gravel pools with no cover.

== Life history ==
The life histories of those darter species within the subgenus Catonotus have similar spawning behaviors. They spawn in shallow pools with little or no current and little body contact between the mates. Adult males occupy territories beneath stones where the eggs are attached to the underside of a covering rock. Females invert and deposit eggs on the ceiling and occasionally the guardian male will invert to a head-to-tail position and fertilize the eggs.

== Conservation and management ==
The stone darter is described as a species of least concern by the International Union for Conservation of Nature Red List. This means the species does not qualify for any of the other designations because it is widespread and abundant. The justification for this assessment is: despite the somewhat small extent of occurrence, listed as Least Concern in view of the substantial number of subpopulations, apparently large population size, apparently stable trend, and lack of major threats.
