= Riverside Farm (Walter Hill, Tennessee) =

Historic house in Tennessee, United States

- U.S. National Register of Historic Places
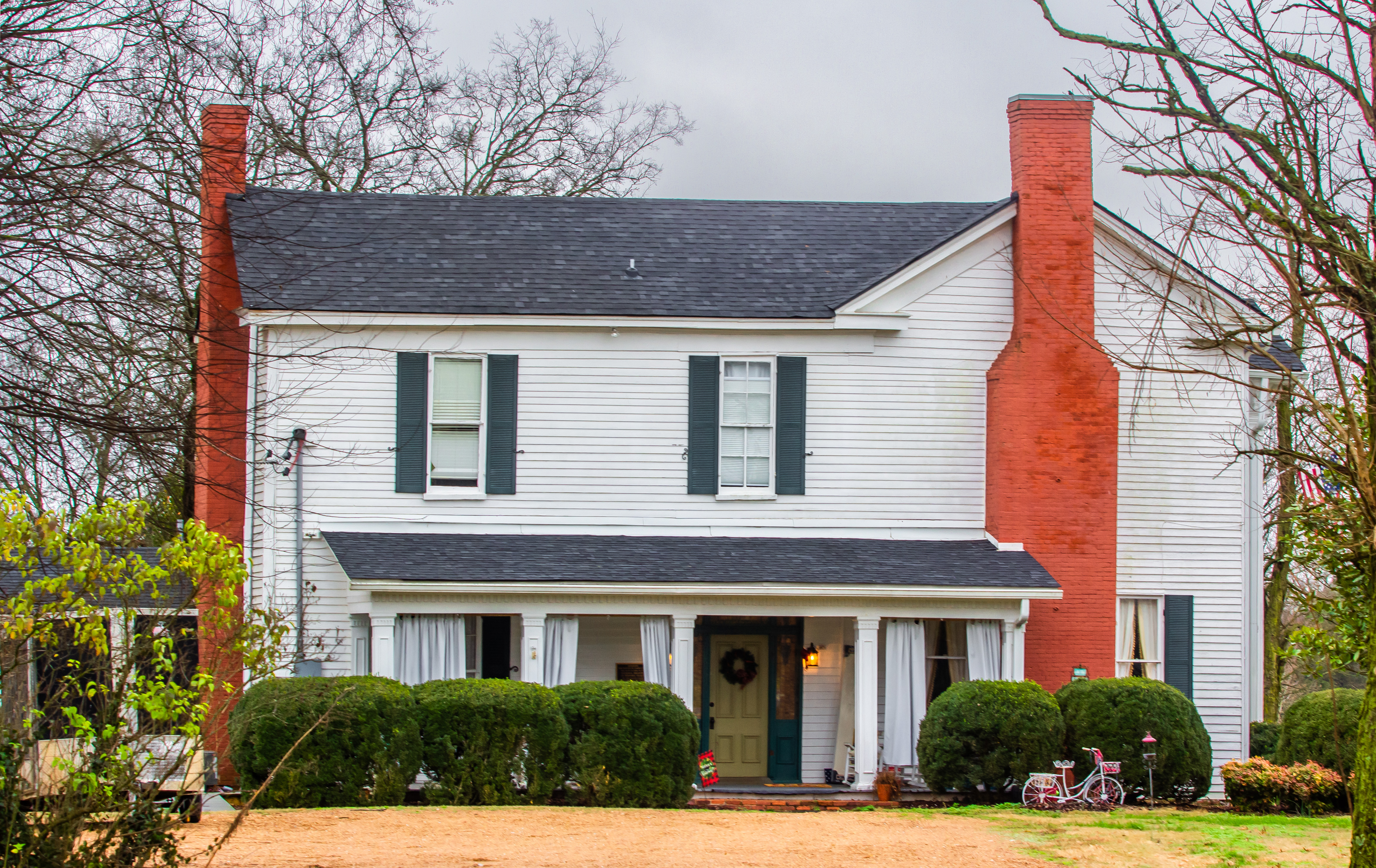

- Location within Tennessee Location within the United States
- Nearest city: Walter Hill, Tennessee
- Coordinates: 35°57′50″N 86°23′25″W
- Area: 13.6 acres (5.5 ha)
- Built: 1831
- Architectural style: Greek Revival, I-house
- MPS: Historic Family Farms in Middle Tennessee MPS
- NRHP reference No.: 06001132
- Added to NRHP: December 12, 2006

Riverside Farm, also known as the Pierce-Randolph Farm, is a historic farmhouse in Walter Hill, Tennessee, U.S..

== History ==
The main house was built circa 1831 for Alfred Pierce, a corn and cotton farmer who owned 23 slaves by 1860. Several more buildings were erected on the farm.

When it was purchased by Beverly Randolph, Jr. in 1871, several of Pierce's former slaves had become tenant farmers. Randolph turned the property into a dairy farm.

By the early 2000s, his descendant, Beverly Randolph Jones, had turned it into a hay farm.

== Architectural significance ==
The main house was designed as an I-house in the Greek Revival architectural style. It has been listed on the National Register of Historic Places since December 12, 2006.
