= Absalom Scales House =

Historic house in Tennessee, United States

- U.S. National Register of Historic Places
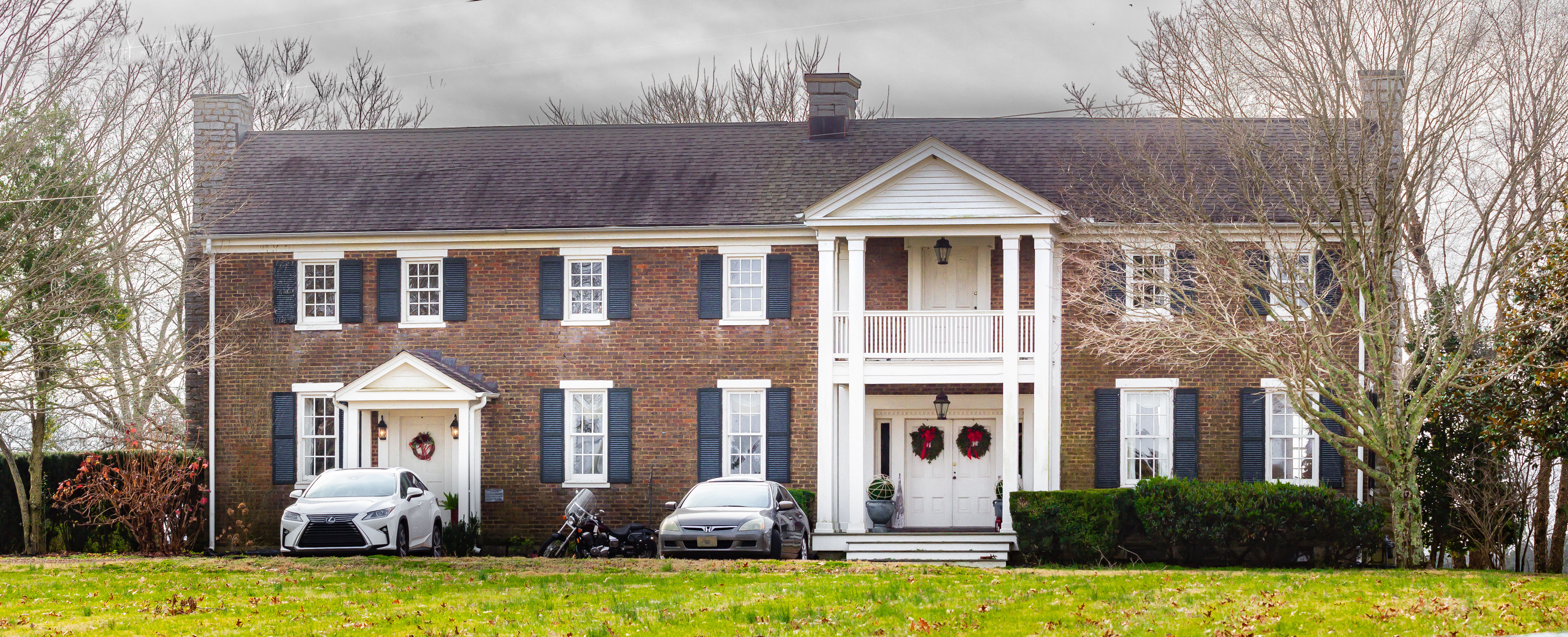

- Location within Tennessee Location within the United States
- Nearest city: Eagleville, Tennessee
- Coordinates: 35°46′27″N 86°38′22″W
- Area: 5 acres (2.0 ha)
- Built: 1790
- Architectural style: Classical Revival, Greek Revival
- NRHP reference No.: 73001821
- Added to NRHP: October 30, 1973

The Absalom Scales House is a historic house in Eagleville, Tennessee, U.S..

== History ==
The house was built circa 1790 for Absalom Scales, a settler from North Carolina, and his wife Nancy Dalton, whose paternal grandfather, Samuel Dalton Sr., was a British immigrant and personal friend of U.S. President James Madison. In 1835, it was inherited by their son Noah, who lived here with his wife, Mary Batie Sayers, and their four children.

During the American Civil War of 1861–1865, Noah's daughter Mary stayed in the house with her husband, John Knox Womack, who was a Free Will Baptist preacher whose uncle was Confederate General A. P. Hill. At the same time, Womack joined the Confederate States Army and served under General Nathan Bedford Forrest. After the war, Womack resumed his ministry. After his wife died, he married her sister Charlotte, with whom he had six children. The house was later inherited by his daughter Nancy and her husband, Joseph A. Johnston.

== Architectural significance ==
The house was designed in the Classical Revival architectural style, and it was later remodelled in the Greek Revival style. It has been listed on the National Register of Historic Places since October 30, 1973.
