= William B. Jordan Farm =

Historic house in Tennessee, United States

- Jordan, William B., Farm
- U.S. National Register of Historic Places
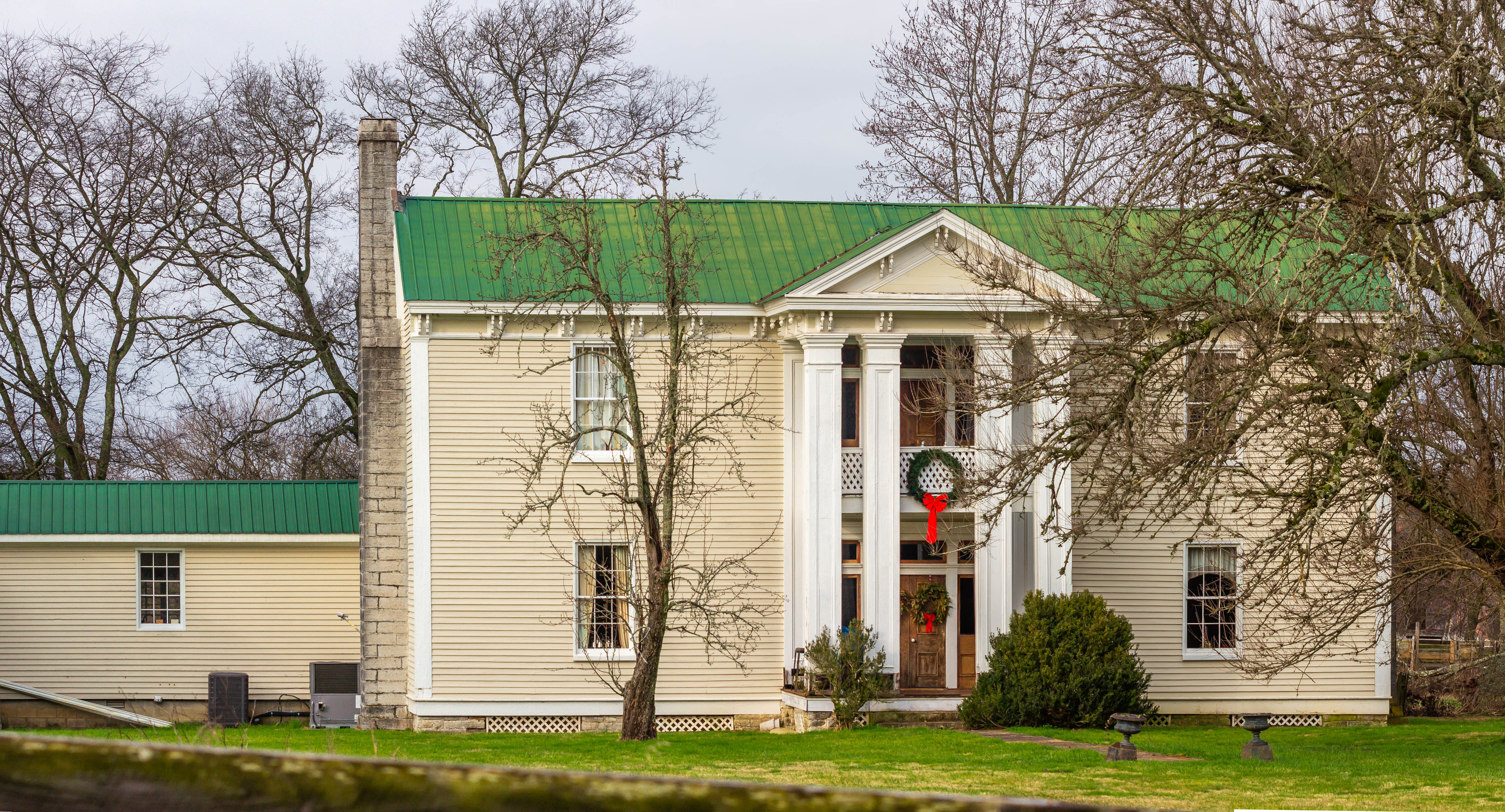
- Nearest city: Eagleville, Tennessee
- Area: 117 acres (47 ha)
- Built: 1850
- Architectural style: Greek Revival, Italianate, I-house
- NRHP reference No.: 92000825
- Added to NRHP: July 13, 1992

The William B. Jordan Farm is a historic farmhouse in Eagleville, Tennessee, U.S..

The farmhouse was built for William B. Jordan, a farmer who owned slaves, from 1847 to 1850. It was designed as an I-house in the Italianate and Greek Revival architectural styles. Moreover, "according to local folklore", the portico was designed by "traveling Italian craftsmen." However, Tennessee State Historian Carroll Van West believes there is no evidence this was the case.

The house has been listed on the National Register of Historic Places since July 13, 1992.
