= William Harrison McCord House =

- U.S. National Register of Historic Places
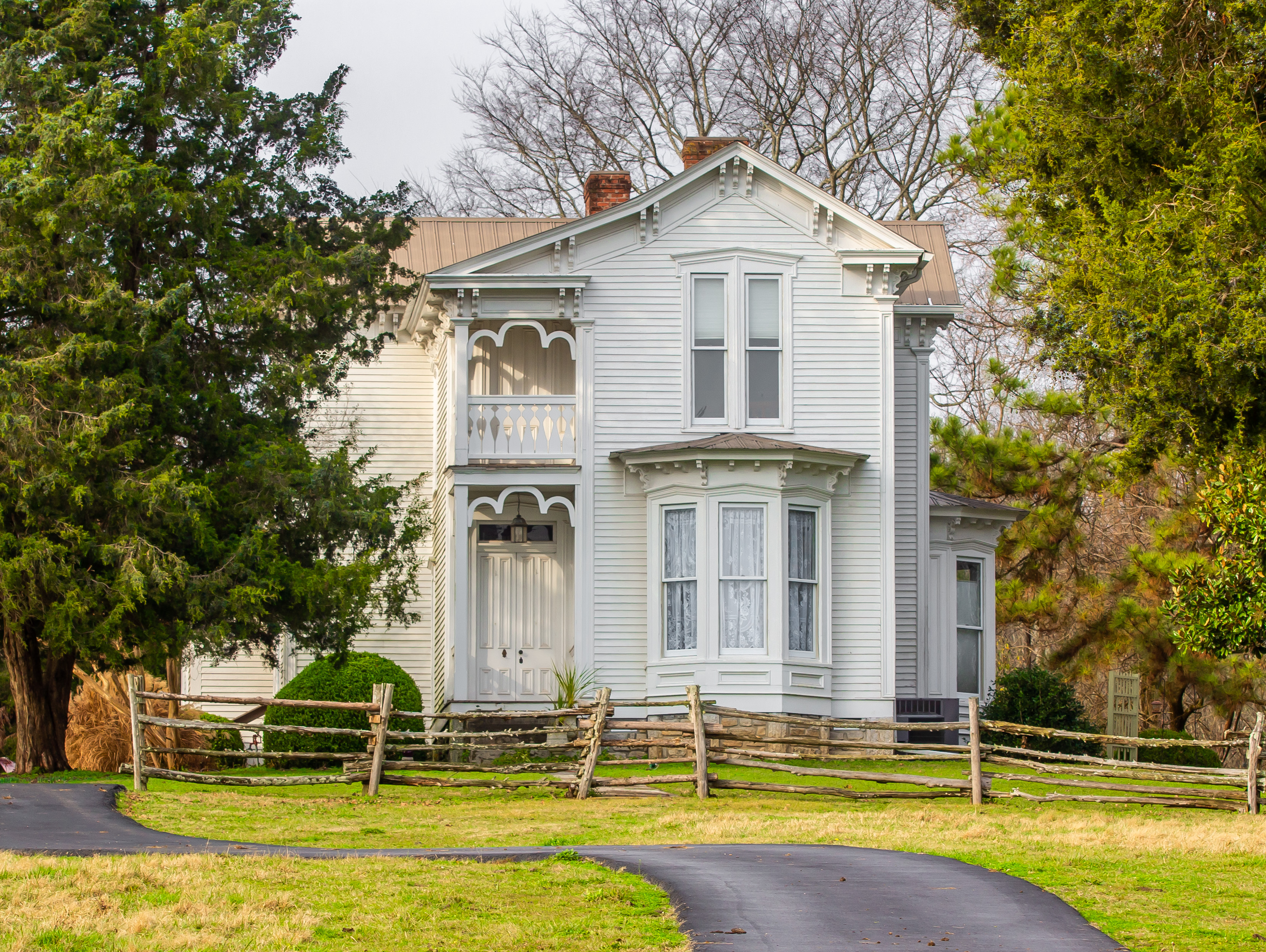

- Location within Tennessee Location within the United States
- Location: 475 N. Main St., Eagleville, Tennessee
- Coordinates: 35°44′46″N 86°39′06″W
- Area: 6 acres (2.4 ha)
- Built: 1882
- Architectural style: Italianate
- NRHP reference No.: 84001121
- Added to NRHP: December 20, 1984

The William Harrison McCord House is a historic house in Eagleville, Tennessee, U.S.. It was built in 1882 for William H. McCord, a physician. During the American Civil War of 1861–1865, McCord joined the Confederate States Army and served as a surgeon under General Nathan Bedford Forrest's command. The house remained in the McCord family in the 1980s.

The house was designed in the Italianate architectural style. It has been listed on the National Register of Historic Places since December 20, 1984.
