= Dement House (Lascassas, Tennessee) =

Historic house in Tennessee, United States

- U.S. National Register of Historic Places
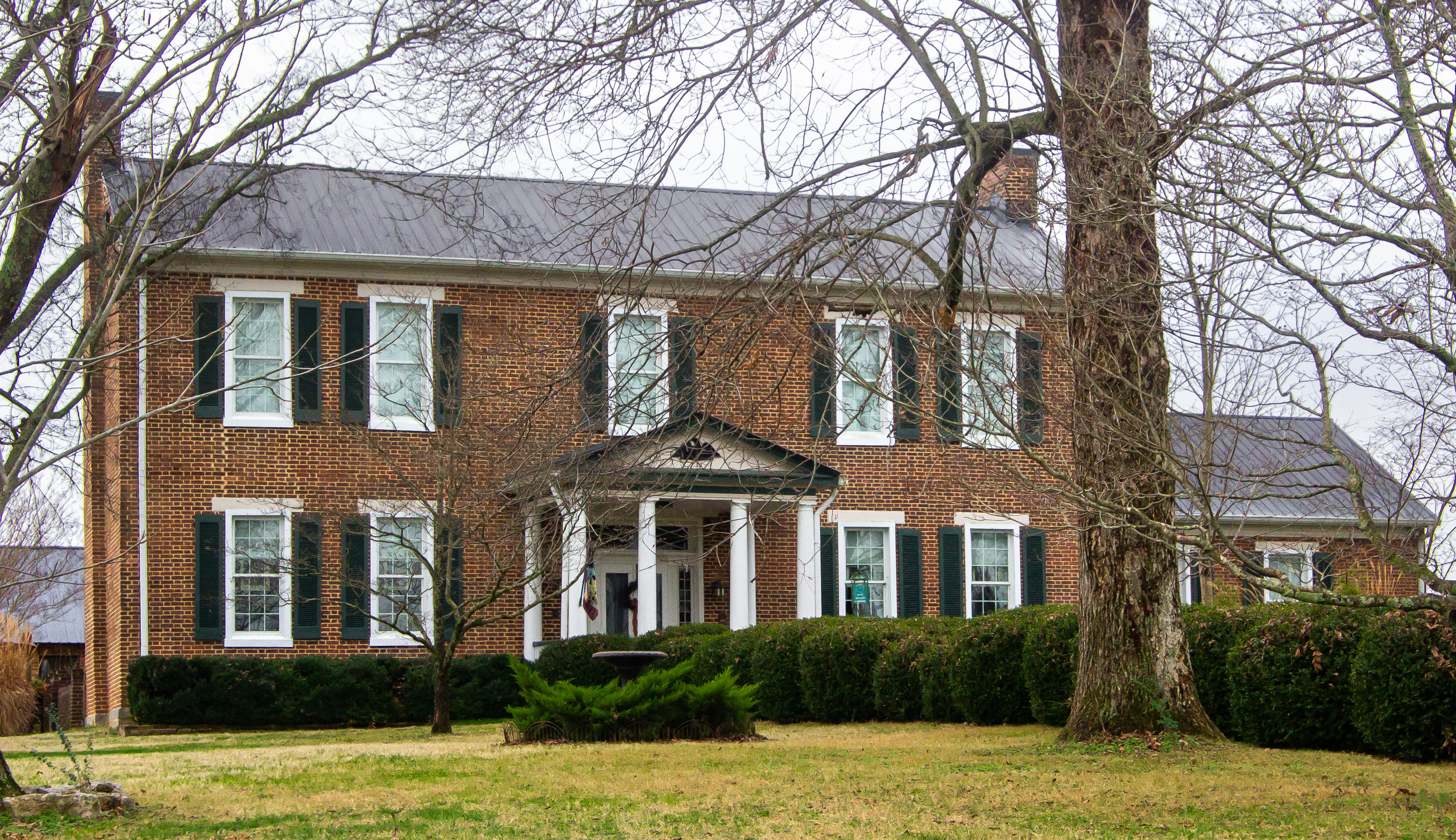

- Location within Tennessee Location within the United States
- Nearest city: Lascassas, Tennessee
- Coordinates: 35°55′56″N 86°16′01″W
- Area: 4.7 acres (1.9 ha)
- Built: 1817
- Architectural style: Greek Revival
- NRHP reference No.: 86001379
- Added to NRHP: June 26, 1986

The Dement House, also known as Colonial Acres, is a historic house in Lascassas, Tennessee, U.S.. It was first built as a log cabin by Abner Dement, the son of a French immigrant and slaveholder, in 1817. When Abner was murdered by one of his slaves in 1825, the cabin was inherited by his son John, who lived here with his wife Christine Overall. The couple hired Arch Hite to turn the cabin into a two-story house with a portico designed in the Greek Revival architectural style in 1833. The house has been listed on the National Register of Historic Places since June 25, 1986.
