= Marymont (Murfreesboro, Tennessee) =

Historic house in Tennessee, United States

- U.S. National Register of Historic Places
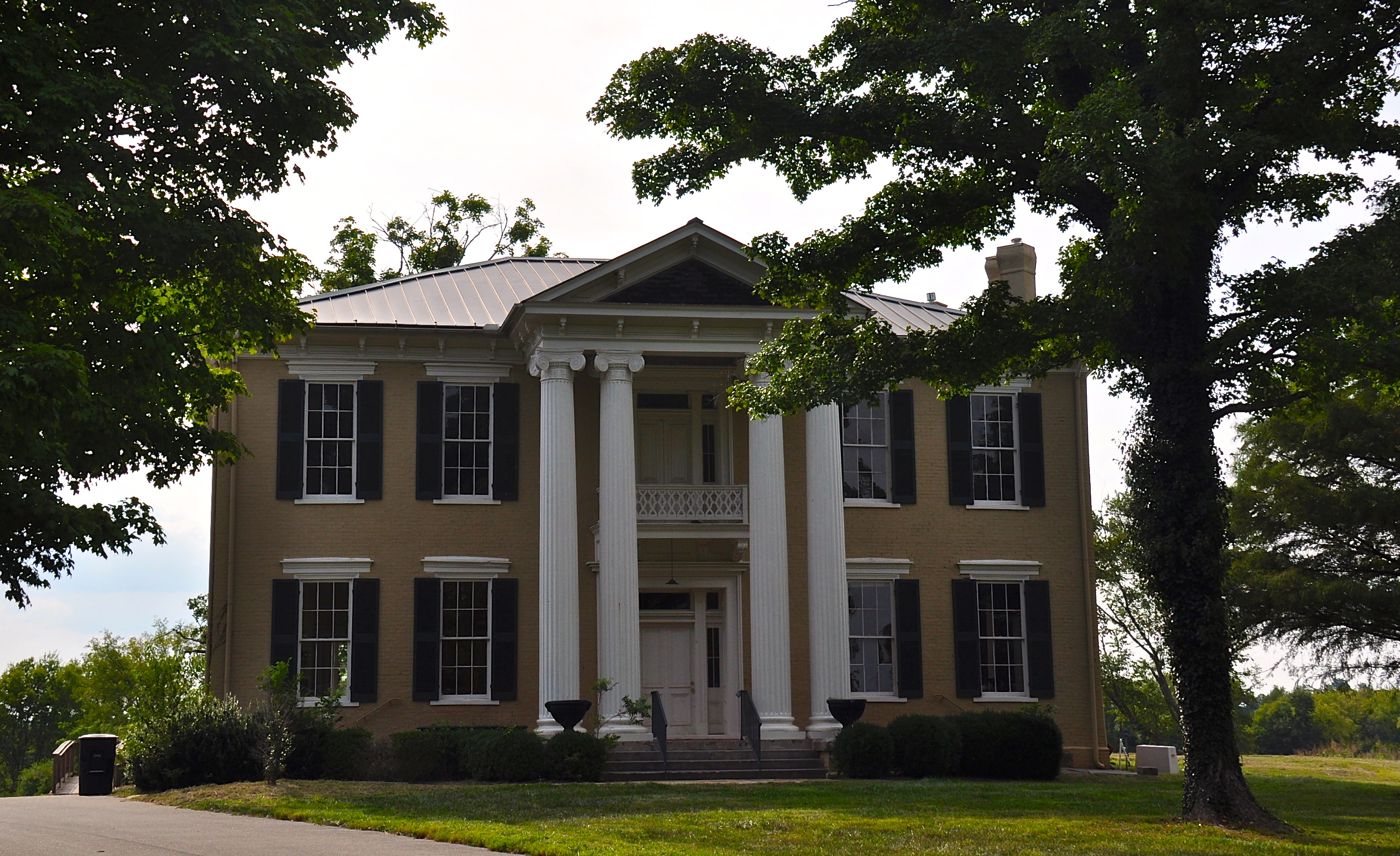
- Marymont in 2014

- Location within Tennessee Location within the United States
- Nearest city: Murfreesboro, Tennessee
- Coordinates: 35°49′12″N 86°28′45″W
- Area: 2.88 acres (1.17 ha)
- Architectural style: Classical Revival, Roman Revival
- NRHP reference No.: 73001824
- Added to NRHP: October 30, 1973

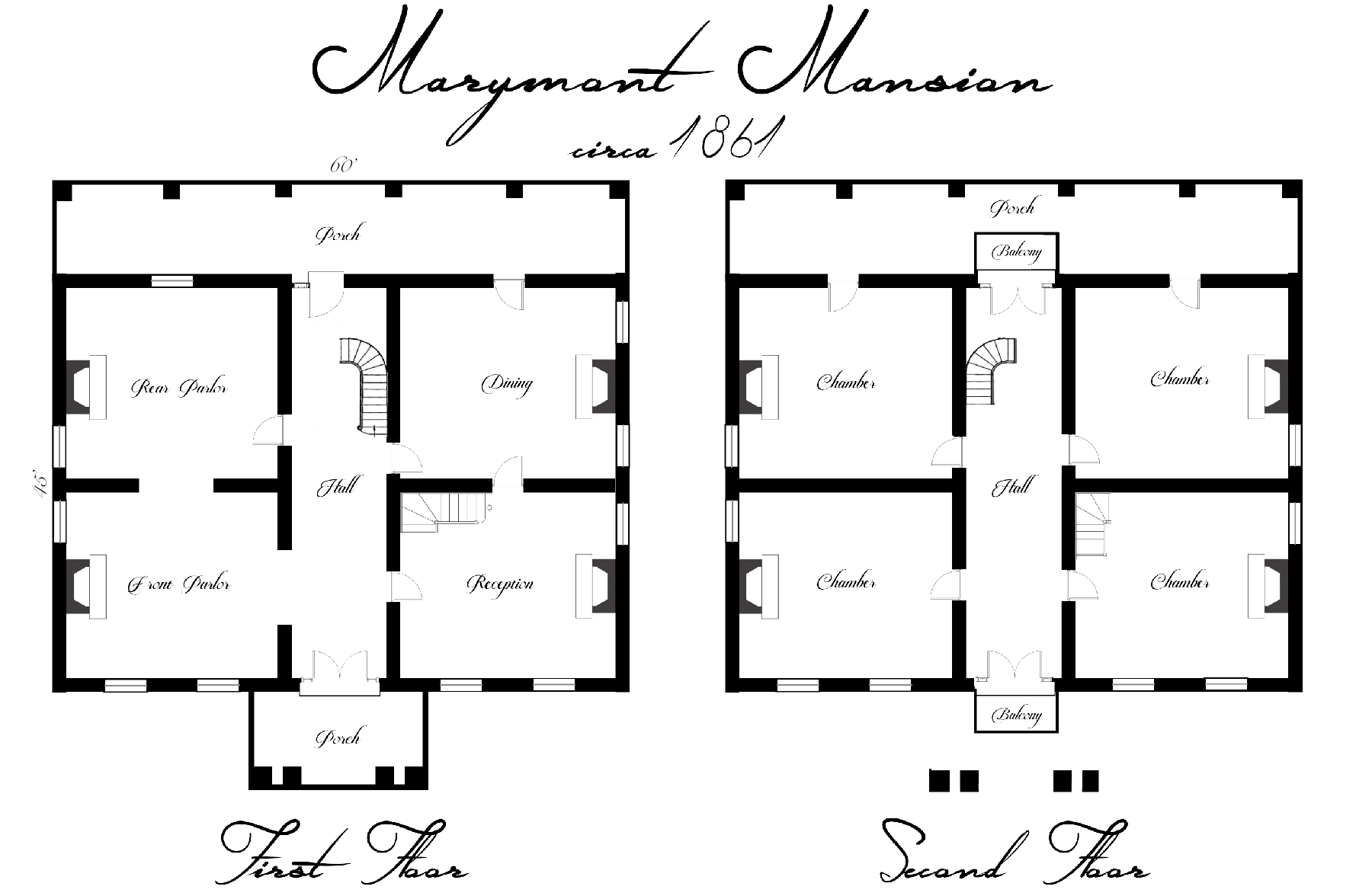
Modern floor plan based on current photos, property visits and a floor plan found in an old text.

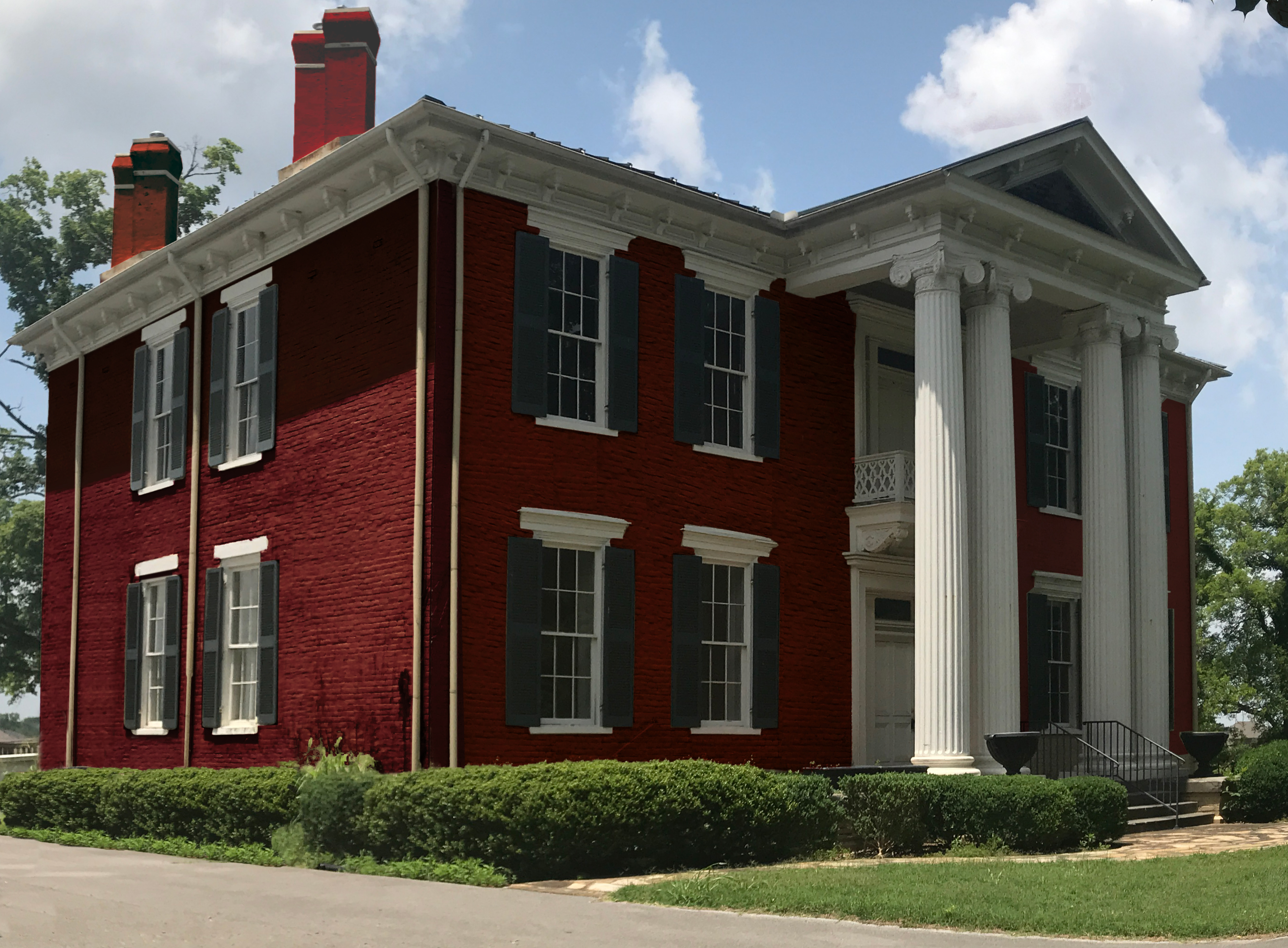
Marymont Mansion in the original brick color. Replacement of current color done in Photoshop.

Marymont is a historic mansion in Murfreesboro, Tennessee, U.S.. It was built in 1860-1861 for Hiram Jenkins. In 1878, it was inherited by his niece, Nimmie Jenkins, and her husband, Dr. J. J. Rucker. They named the house after their daughter, Mary Rucker.

The house was designed in the Classical Revival architectural style, with Roman Revival finishes. It has been listed on the National Register of Historic Places since October 30, 1973.

In 2019, Marymount had plans to be transformed into a cigar and wine bar by a local couple.
