= John C. Spence House =

Historic house in Murfreesboro, Tennessee, US

- U.S. National Register of Historic Places
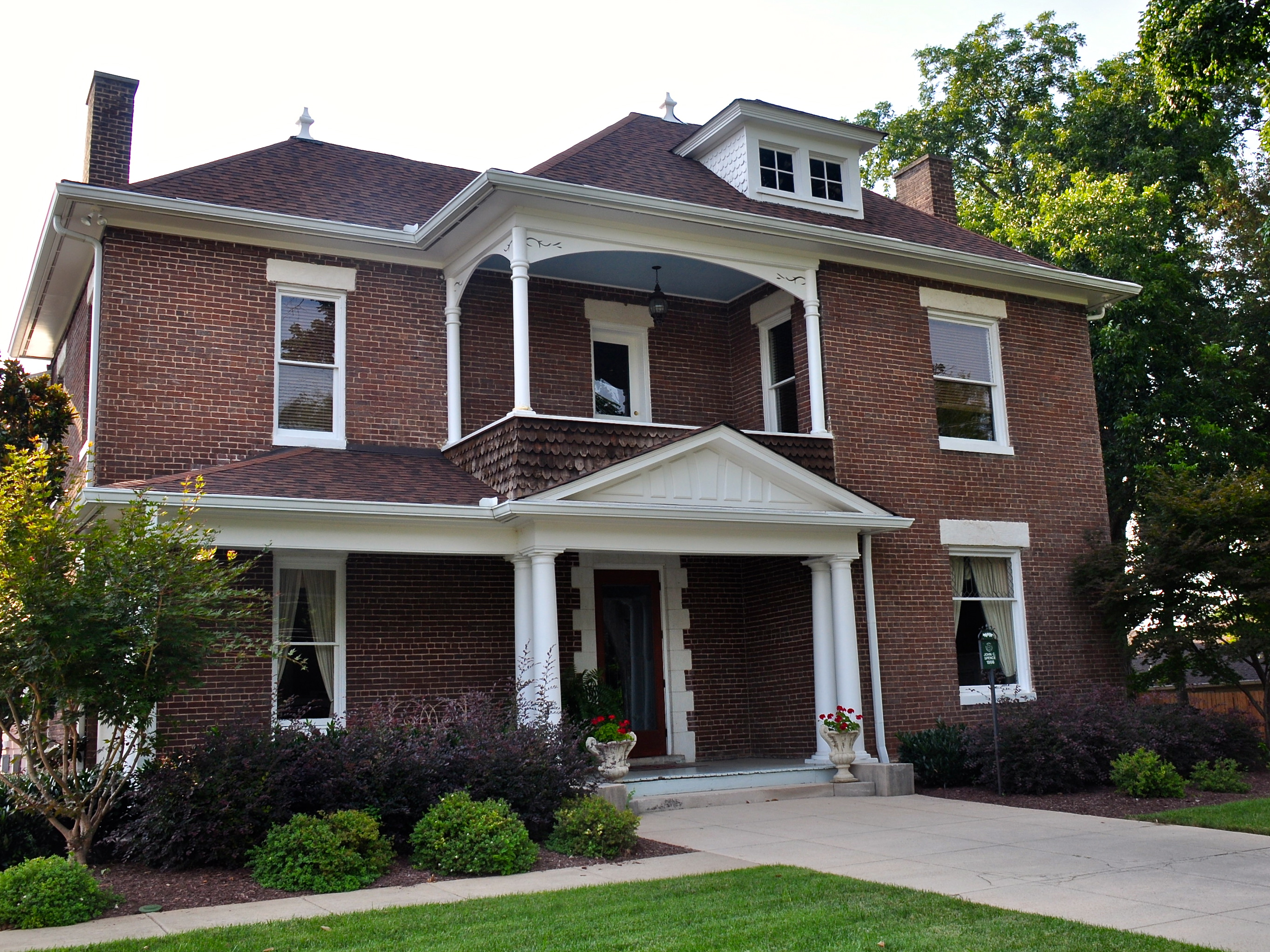
- John C. Spence House, 2014

- Location within Tennessee
- Location: 503 North Maple Street, Murfreesboro, Tennessee, US
- Coordinates: 35°51′02.5″N 86°23′32.2″W
- Area: 1.1 acres (0.45 ha)
- Built: c. 1892
- Architectural style: Queen Anne
- NRHP reference No.: 04000302
- Added to NRHP: August 23, 2004

The John C. Spence House is a historic 19th-century house in Murfreesboro, Tennessee, United States. It is located at 503 North Maple Street. Despite its name, the house was probably constructed for John A. Moore around 1892. Later, it was converted into an apartment building. It was the chapter house for the Middle Tennessee State University Pi Kappa Alpha from 1974 to 1981. Today, it is used for professional offices. The house was listed on the National Register of Historic Places on August 23, 2004.

== History ==
The Spence House was originally constructed near West College Street at an unknown date. It was moved to its current location at 503 North Maple Street in 1866 and became the residence of Elizabeth and John Cedric Spence. Elizabeth purchased the lot from their son-in-law, William Roulet and the house was in her name.

Spence was the owner of a grocery and hardware store, founder of the Cedar Bucket Manufactory in Rutherford County in 1854, and the author of the Annals of Rutherford County; 1829-1870. When Elizabeth died in 1884, she left the house to her children, Henry Spence, Florence Spence, and Mary Spence Roulet. Spence probably lived in the house until he died in 1890.

On January 20, 1891, the Spence children sold the house to John A. Moore. The Moores demolished the original structure and replaced it with the existing brick house. It remained in the Moore family until it was purchased by Lucy and George Brown on June 6, 1935. Brown was the co-owner of Byrn and Brown Hardware in downtown Murfreesboro. The Browns divorced in 1940; Lucy acquired the house in the divorce settlement. She converted the house into apartments to have an income.

After an unsuccessful attempt to sell the house in 1970, Brown rented the house to the Middle Tennessee State University chapter of the Pi Kappa Alpha fraternity from 1974 to 1981. Brown evicted the fraternity in 1981 because of its poor treatment of the house and property.

In June 1981, Brown sold the house to Molly and Roger Teague, her daughter and son-in-law. However, the property reverted to Brown in foreclosure in 1985. She sold the house to the Children's Discovery House Museum in August 1985. The museum sold the property to Greg Tucker. Kious and Rogers, PLLC, bought the house in 2001 for law firm offices. Kious Rodgers Barger Holder & King, Attorneys at Law, had their offices in the house in 2022.

The house was listed on the National Register of Historic Places on August 23, 2004.

== Architecture ==
The Spence House was constructed around 1891. The house is a local interpretation of the Queen Anne architectural style. The two-story brick house sits on a stone foundation. It is of solid brick construction and includes three interior wall chimneys. Its windows have stone lintels. It has a Queen Anne-style wrap-around front porch, supported by Tuscan columns and decorated with sawn-cut wooden shingles. Its front windows are leaded glass. Its four-square interior plan includes a paneled central hall with a parlor on each side and a dining room and office in the rear. Interior decorative features include pocket doors and original baseboards and window trim.

Around 1941, Lucy Brown enclosed the two-story sleeping porch and added a frame efficiency apartment above the house's original kitchen. The Children's Discovery House Museum sealed the fireplaces and removed the mantles throughout the house. Brown's addition was replaced with a frame addition in 2003. At this time, the fireplaces were unsealed and replacement mantles were added.

Its property includes a stone wall and an 1866 fence with seventeen stone obelisk-shaped posts that are joined by cast iron rails and balusters.

== See also ==
- North American fraternity and sorority housing
