= Providence Primitive Baptist Church =

Historic church in Tennessee, United States

- U.S. National Register of Historic Places
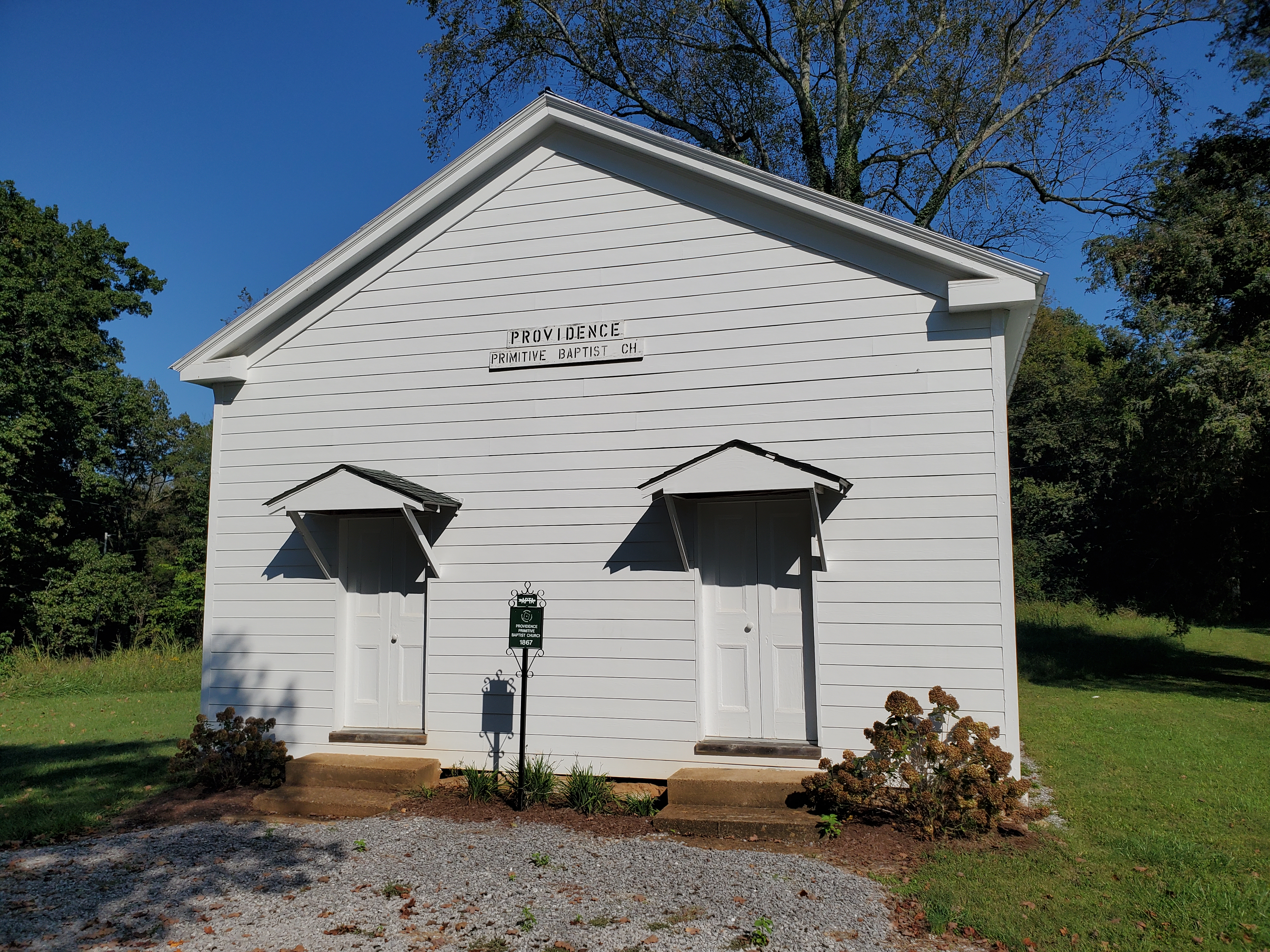

- Location within Tennessee Location within the United States
- Location: 256 Central Valley Road, Walter Hill, Tennessee
- Coordinates: 35°56′19″N 86°22′51″W
- Area: 2.4 acres (0.97 ha)
- Built: 1867
- NRHP reference No.: 00001357
- Added to NRHP: November 8, 2000

Providence Primitive Baptist Church is a historic Primitive Baptist church at 256 Central Valley Road in Walter Hill, Tennessee, United States. The church was built circa 1867 for a congregation that dated back to 1819; its previous church was destroyed in the American Civil War. In addition to its association with the Primitive Baptist movement, which followed simple worship practices and opposed membership in statewide Baptist conventions, the early congregation was also affiliated with the anti-missionary movement within the Baptist faith. The 1867 building has a plain design with two sex-segregated entrances; the interior of the church is also split by its center aisle into sections for men and women. Following the Civil War and Emancipation, some African American residents who worshiped there while enslaved continued to attend services. Like many other Southern churches at the time, black churchgoers' efforts to have a more equal place in the congregation sparked backlash from whites; in 1876, the church segregated and expelled all of its black members.

The church was added to the National Register of Historic Places in 2000.
