= Gen. Joseph B. Palmer House =

Historic house in Tennessee, United States

- U.S. National Register of Historic Places
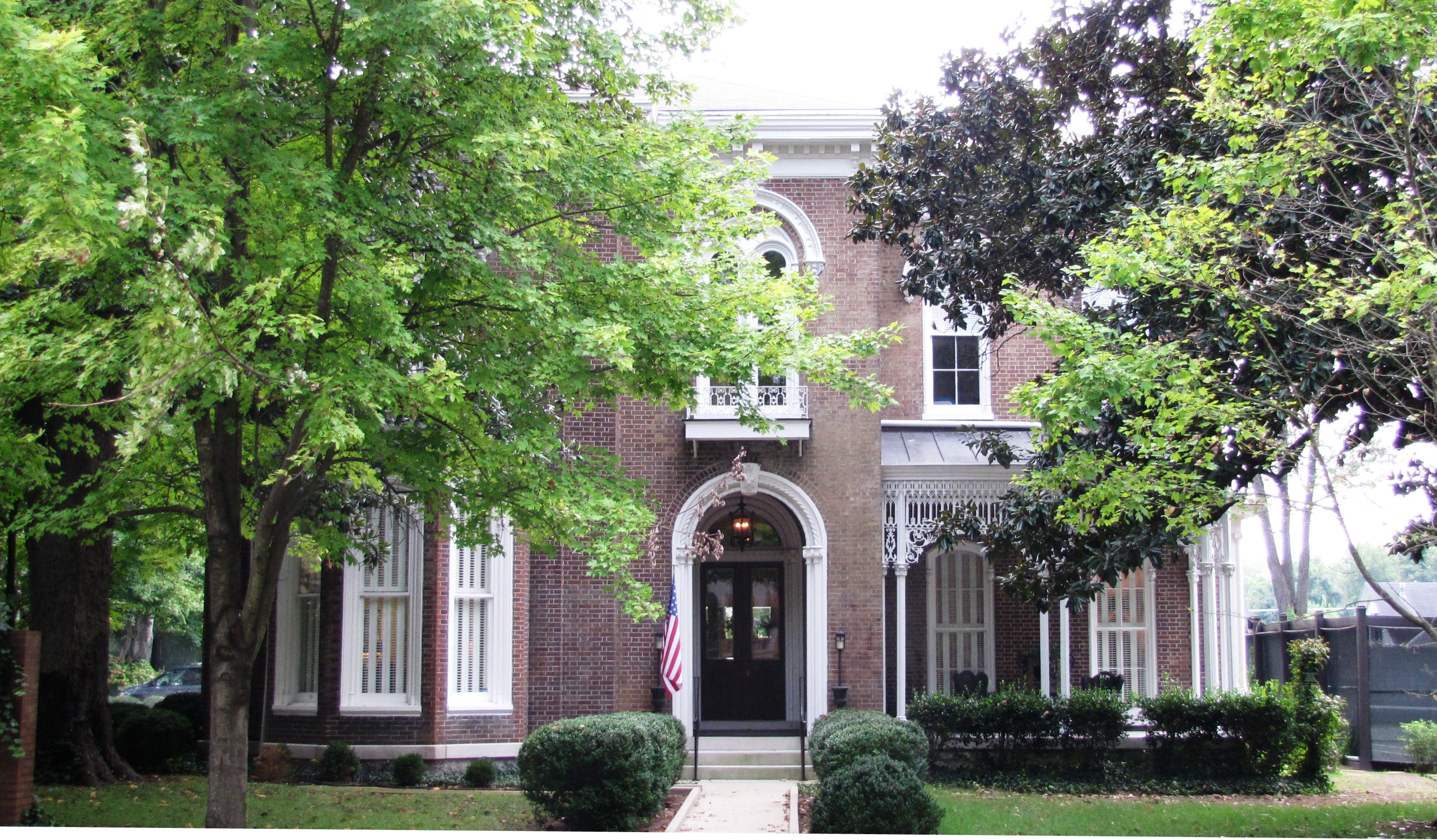
- The Gen. Joseph B. Palmer House in 2010

- Location within Tennessee Location within the United States
- Location: 434 East Main Street, Murfreesboro, Tennessee
- Coordinates: 35°50′42.09″N 86°23′6.60″W
- Area: 2 acres (0.81 ha)
- Built: 1867
- Architectural style: Italian Villa
- NRHP reference No.: 73001825
- Added to NRHP: September 20, 1973

The Gen. Joseph B. Palmer House is a historic house in Murfreesboro, Tennessee, U.S.. It was built in 1867-1869 for Joseph B. Palmer, who served as a general in the Confederate States Army during the American Civil War of 1861–1865. It was designed in the Italianate architectural style. It has been listed on the National Register of Historic Places since September 20, 1973.
