= Caff-E-Hill Farm =

Historic house in Tennessee, United States

- U.S. National Register of Historic Places
- U.S. Historic district
- Nearest city: Readyville, Tennessee
- Area: 130 acres (53 ha)
- Built: 1859
- Architectural style: I-House
- MPS: Historic Family Farms in Middle Tennessee MPS
- NRHP reference No.: 95000412
- Added to NRHP: April 14, 1995

Caff-E-Hill Farm is a historic farmhouse in Readyville, Tennessee, United States.

The farm was established circa 1859 for James Newton Caffey. Caffey "grew corn, hay and wheat and raised hogs, sheep and cattle." The farm later became a cattle farm, followed by a dairy farm.

The house was designed in the I-house style. It has been listed on the National Register of Historic Places since April 14, 1995.

== See also ==
- Agriculture in the United States
