= Thomas C. Black House =

Historic house in Tennessee, United States

- U.S. National Register of Historic Places
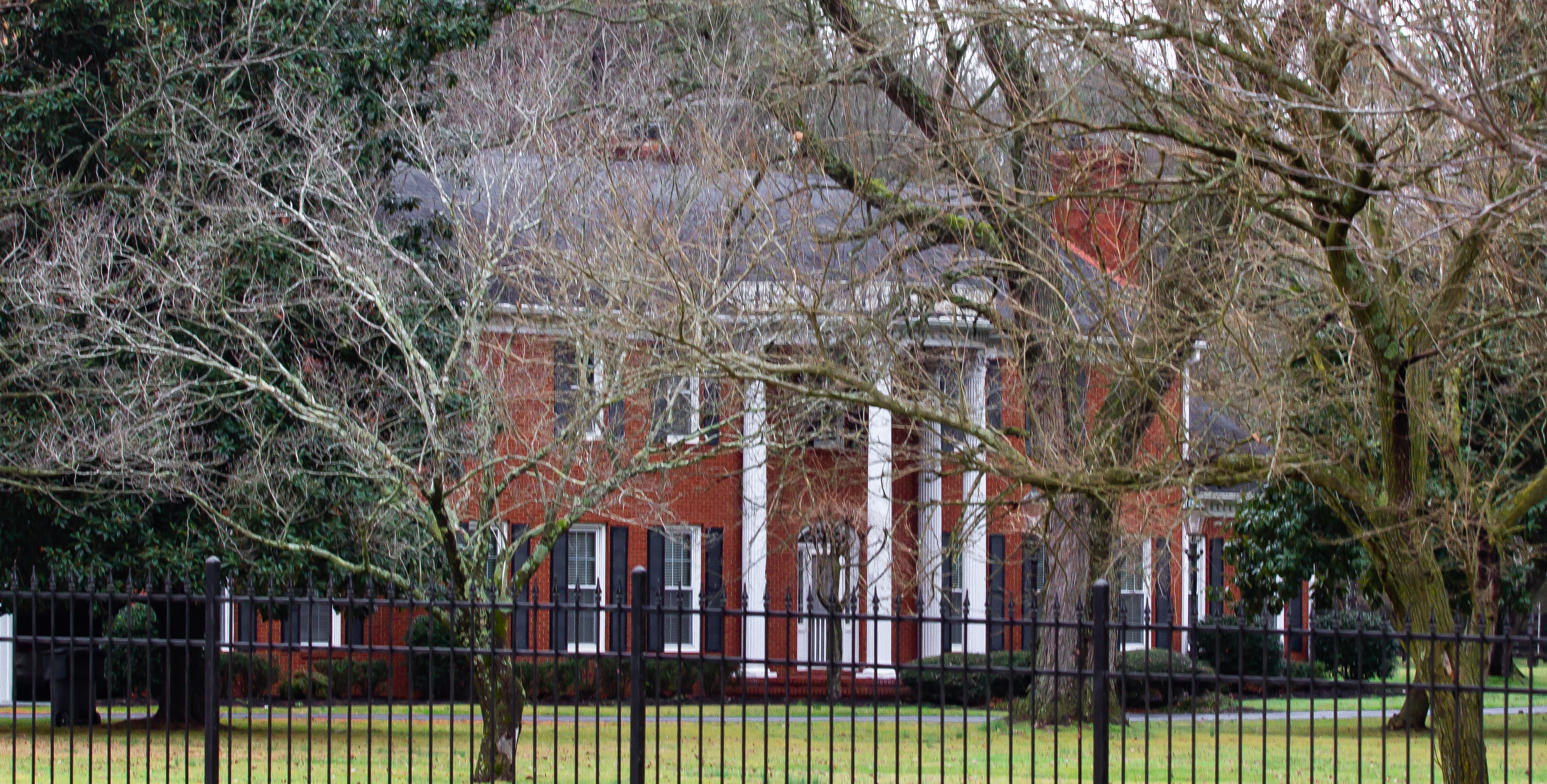

- Location within Tennessee
- Nearest city: Murfreesboro, Tennessee
- Coordinates: 35°55′38″N 86°22′58″W
- Area: 3 acres (1.2 ha)
- Built: 1820
- Architectural style: Italianate, Greek Revival
- NRHP reference No.: 96000231
- Added to NRHP: July 5, 1996

The Thomas C. Black House, also known as Old Black Place, is a historic house in Murfreesboro, Tennessee, United States.

== History ==
The house was built circa 1820, and significantly expanded in the 1850s. It belonged to Samuel P. Black and his wife, Fannie Sanders, and it was later inherited by their son Thomas. Samuel Black was an educator, and one of his students was future U.S. president James K. Polk, who visited the house many times.

The house remained in the Black family until 1954.

== Architectural significance ==
The house was designed in the Italianate and Greek Revival architectural styles. It has been listed on the National Register of Historic Places since July 5, 1996.
