= Jarman Farm =

Historic house in Tennessee, United States

- U.S. National Register of Historic Places
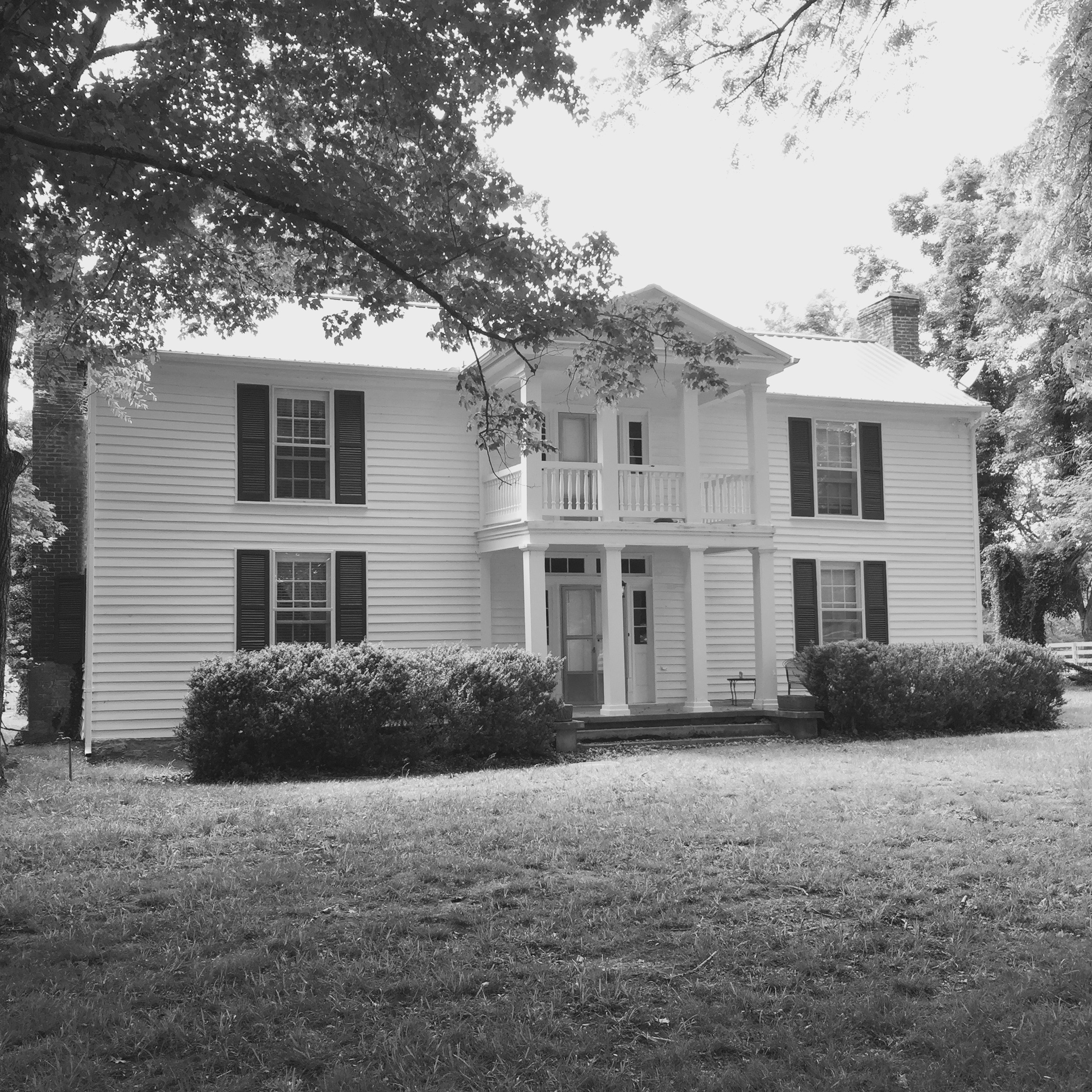
- The Jarman Farm in 2015

- Location within Tennessee Location within the United States
- Nearest city: Lascassas, Tennessee
- Area: 15.1 acres (6.1 ha)
- Built: 1855
- NRHP reference No.: 87001368
- Added to NRHP: July 6, 1987

The Jarman Farm is a historic house in Lascassas, Tennessee, U.S.. It was built in 1850-1860 for Robert Hall Jarman, who owned 19 slaves by 1860. It was inherited by his son, Rufus E. Jarman, in 1884. It was later inherited by his granddaughter, who married Jack Penuel. The property includes several outbuildings and a cemetery. It has been listed on the National Register of Historic Places since July 6, 1987.
