= Collier-Lane-Crichlow House =

Historic house in Tennessee, United States

- Formerly listed on the U.S. National Register of Historic Places
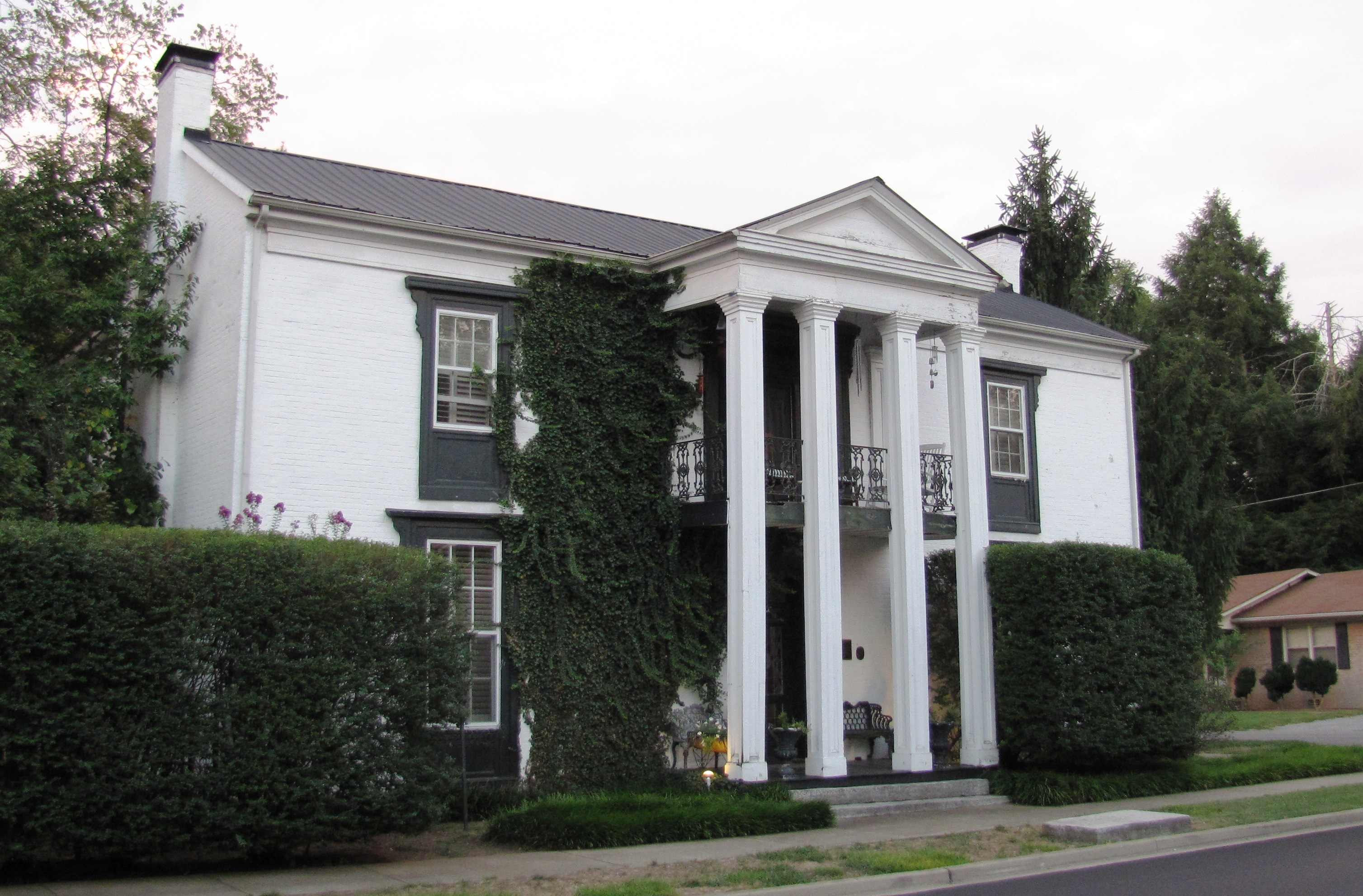
- Collier-Lane-Crichlow House

- Location within Tennessee Location within the United States
- Location: 500 North Spring Street, Murfreesboro, Tennessee
- Coordinates: 35°50′59.8″N 86°23′21.7″W
- Area: 0.4 acres (0.16 ha)
- Built: 1850
- Built by: Sterling P. Jones
- Architectural style: Vernacular Southern National
- NRHP reference No.: 78002629

Significant dates
- Added to NRHP: August 23, 1978
- Removed from NRHP: October 23, 2023

The Collier-Lane-Crichlow House was a historic house in Murfreesboro, Tennessee, United States. It was built circa 1850 for architect Sterling P. Jones, who designed in the Federal, Georgian and Greek Revival architectural styles. It was purchased by brothers Jessie A. Collier and Newton C. Collier in 1858. Four of Murfreesboro's mayors from the Collier-Crichlow family lived in the house: Ingram Collier, Newton B. Collier, James H. Crichlow Jr., and N. Collier Crichlow. It was restored by new homeowners in 1975. It was listed on the National Register of Historic Places on August 23, 1978. It was demolished in January 2023, and was delisted from the National Register in October 2023.
