= Landsberger-Gerhardt House =

Historic house in Tennessee, United States

- Landsberger--Gerhardt House
- U.S. National Register of Historic Places
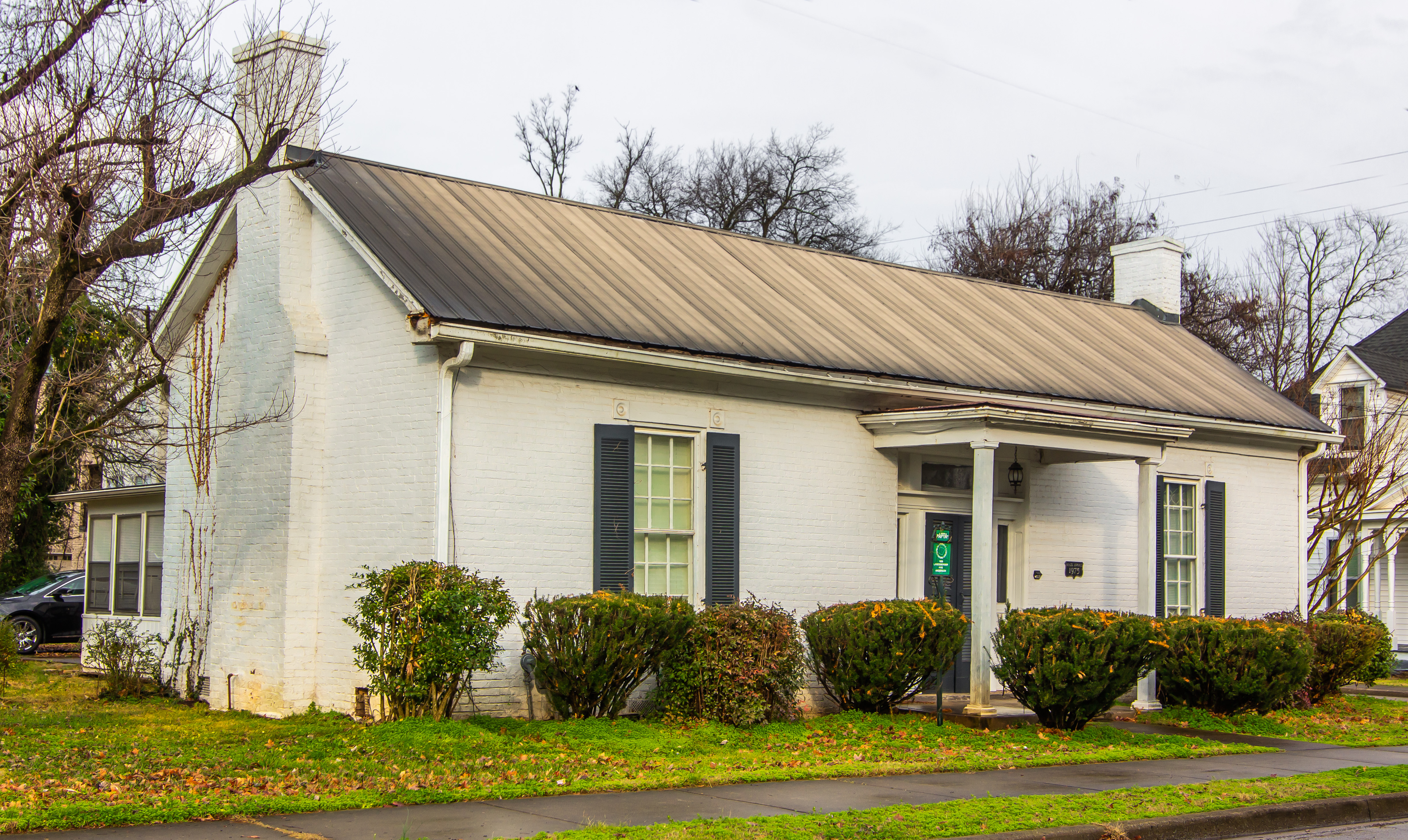

- Location within Tennessee
- Location: 435 North Spring Street, Murfreesboro, Tennessee
- Coordinates: 35°51′0.50″N 86°23′23.03″W
- Area: less than one acre
- Built: 1855
- Architectural style: Vernacular Greek Revival
- NRHP reference No.: 93001397
- Added to NRHP: December 13, 1993

The Landsberger-Gerhardt House, also known as the Fite-Anderson House, is a historic house in Murfreesboro, Tennessee, U.S.. It was built in the Antebellum era for a merchant. It is listed on the National register of Historic Places.

== History ==
The house was built in 1855 by Edwin Arnold, who built many other houses in Murfreesboro in the Antebellum era, for Moses Landsberger, a merchant. It remained in the Landsberger family until 1904.

The house belonged to William Gerhardt from 1907 to 1921, when it was acquired by E. C. Fite. It was inherited by his daughter, Evelyn Fite Anderson.

== Architectural significance ==
The house was designed in the Greek Revival architectural style. It has been listed on the National Register of Historic Places since December 13, 1993.
