= Elmwood (Murfreesboro, Tennessee) =

Historic plantation in Tennessee, US

- U.S. National Register of Historic Places
- Location within Tennessee Location within the United States
- Nearest city: Murfreesboro, Tennessee
- Coordinates: 35°53′46″N 86°27′28″W
- Area: 9 acres (3.6 ha)
- Architect: Thomas Hord
- Architectural style: Classical Revival
- NRHP reference No.: 73001823
- Added to NRHP: October 15, 1973

Elmwood Plantation is a former plantation and a historic mansion, located in Rutherford County near Murfreesboro, Tennessee. It was built in the 1840s for Thomas Hord, a lawyer who owned slaves. It was once one of the largest plantation complexes in Middle Tennessee. The mansion was designed in the Classical Revival architectural style. During the Battle of Murfreesboro (also known as the Battle of Stones River) in 1862 to 1863, the Elmwood mansion was used as a hospital by the Union Army.

Elmwood has been listed on the National Register of Historic Places since October 15, 1973, for its architectural and military significance.
