= Arnold-Harrell House =

Historic house in Tennessee, United States

- Arnold--Harrell House
- U.S. National Register of Historic Places
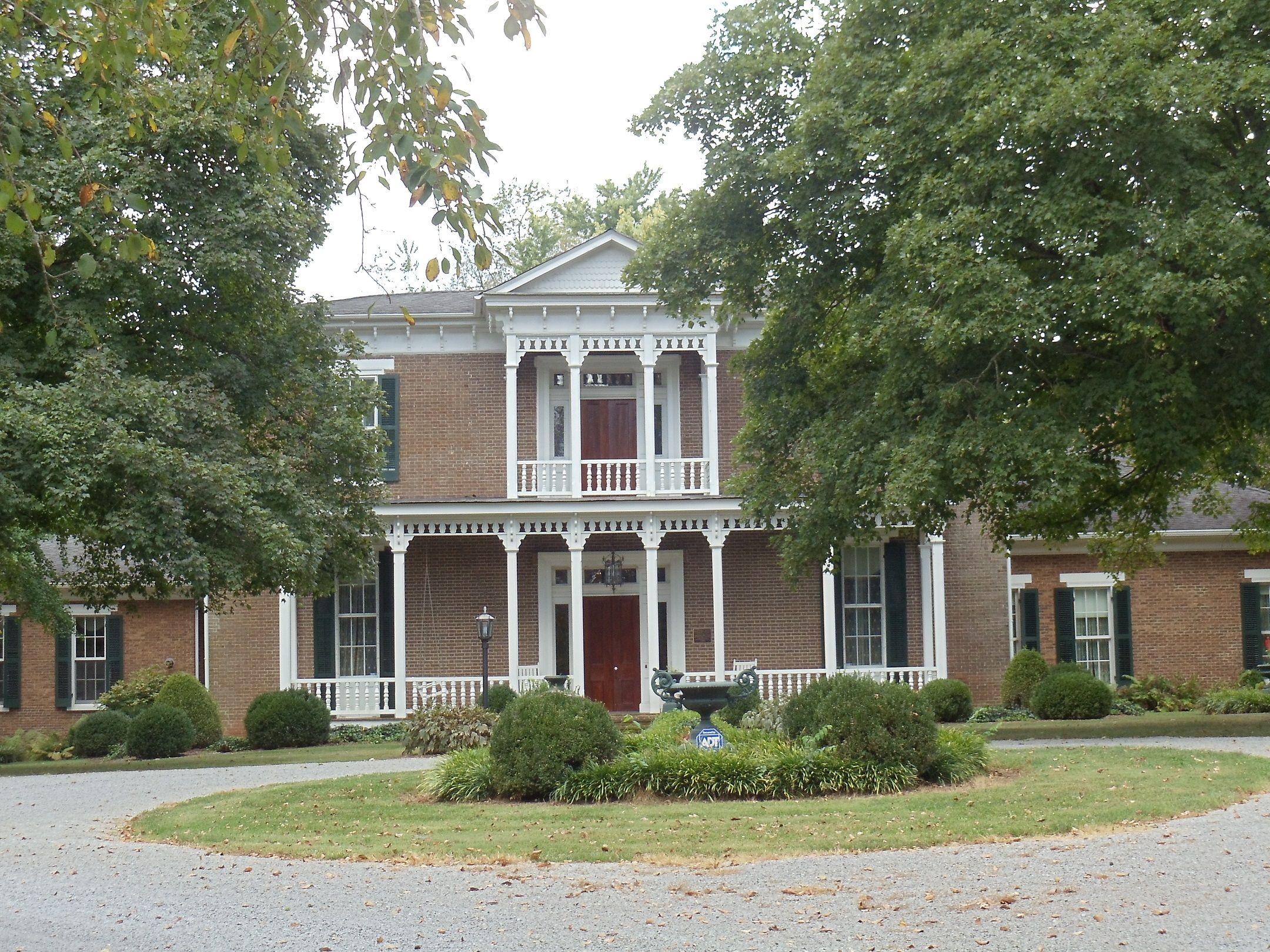
- The Arnold-Harrell House in 2014

- Location within Tennessee Location within the United States
- Location: 1710 East Main Street, Murfreesboro, Tennessee
- Coordinates: 35°50′26.5″N 86°21′49.3″W
- Area: 2.8 acres (1.1 ha)
- Built: 1861
- Architect: Arnold, Edwin
- Architectural style: Mid 19th Century Revival, Italianate
- NRHP reference No.: 92000145
- Added to NRHP: March 27, 1992

Arnold-Harrell House is a historic house in Murfreesboro, Tennessee, United States.

== History ==
The house was built in 1861 for Edwin Arnold and his wife Harriet McLanahan. During the American Civil War, their daughter Mary Dean was accidentally shot in the house by the Union Army but recovered. By 1862, the house had been ransacked.

The house was purchased by Reuben C. Harrell in 1895. His grandson, Henry Harrell, sold some of the land on the property to build more houses in 1940–1955.

== Architectural significance ==
The house was designed in the Italianate and architectural styles. It has been listed on the National Register of Historic Places since March 27, 1992.
