= Harris/Morgan House (Fosterville, Tennessee) =

Historic house in Tennessee, United States

- Morgan House
- U.S. National Register of Historic Places
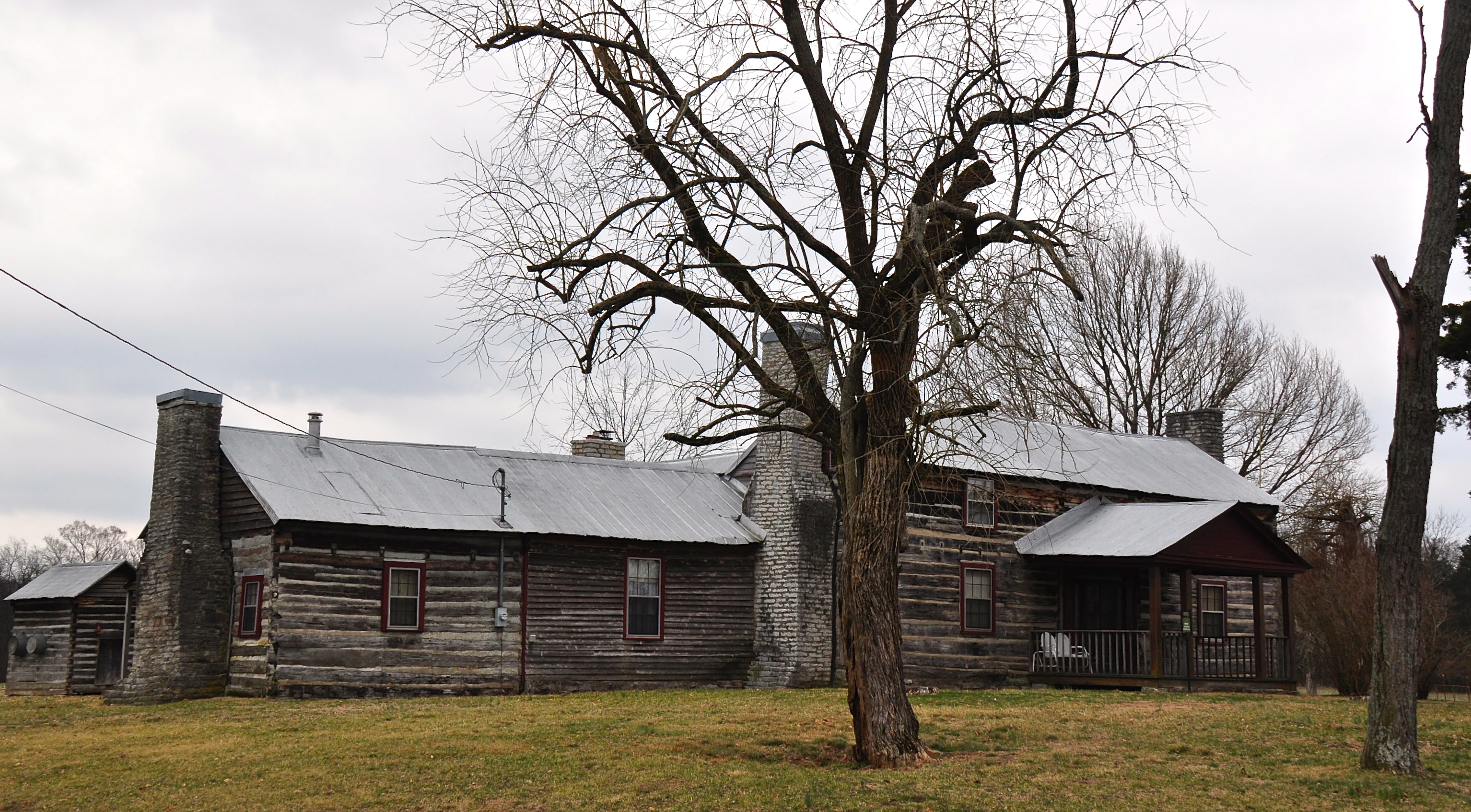
- Harris/Morgan House, March 2014.

- Location within Tennessee Location within the United States
- Nearest city: Christiana, Tennessee
- Coordinates: 35°39′22″N 86°27′27″W
- Area: 3.5 acres (1.4 ha)
- Built: 1811
- Architectural style: Dog Trot
- NRHP reference No.: 79002457
- Added to NRHP: December 27, 1979

Located in southern Rutherford County, Tennessee, where Harrison Lane crosses the West Fork of The Stones River, the Morgan House remains.

Peter Coffee, Sr. (1716-Nov 1771) was born in Ireland and married Susannah Mathews (1701–1796), and they immigrated to Virginia. Peter and Susannah had a son Joshua Coffee (Jan 26, 1745 – Sept 8, 1797) who married Elizabeth Graves (Jan 28, 1751 – Feb 25, 1804) and they had a daughter Mary Coffee (Aug 15, 1774 – Apr 28, 1839). [Joshua, a Captain of Light Horse under Col. Philip Taylor in August 1780. By the fall of 1780, he was attached to Col. William Richardson Davie (NC State Cavalry-Western District) and by 1781, a Captain under Col. Philip Taylor (Granville County Regiment).]

Originally constructed in 1811 by General John Coffee (June 2, 1772 – July 7, 1833), the home was presented to his sister Mary Harris (née Coffee) (August 15, 1774 - April 28, 1839), on the occasion of her wedding Simpson Harris, (November 21, 1768 - May 8, 1833). The land was purchased from the inheritance the Coffee siblings received from their father, Lieutenant Joshua Coffee, as detailed in his will. (John Coffee married Mary Donelson, the daughter of Captain John Donelson III and Mary Purnell, on October 3, 1809. A paternal aunt of Mrs. Coffee was Andrew Jackson's wife, Rachel Donelson Robards).

Mary Coffee married Simpson Harris (Nov 21, 1768 – May 8, 1833) and they had a daughter Harriet Hutchens Harris (Feb 29, 1797 – Feb 20, 1861) who married Samuel C. Morgan (Feb 26, 1794 – Aug 8, 1824). Their son John William Morgan (Jul 8, 1818 – Oct 22, 1901) married Isabella Caroline Means (Jul 4 1824 – Dec 11, 1881). And their son Carey Morgan (Dec 15, 1865 – Jun 16, 1942) married Frankie Lavinia McLain (Mar 4, 1874 – Oct 9, 1911) who are also the parents of Harvey Logan Morgan (Aug 30 1900 – May 1970).

William Morgan (1818-1901) and Caroline Means Morgan (1824-1881), settled adjacent to the Coffee property in the vicinity of the recently known Whitworth/Westmorland farm, situated south of Campground Road, across from the Morgan Family Cemetery. Richard ("Dick") Carey Morgan (December 15, 1865 - June 16, 1942) the 10th child of William and Caroline, purchased the Harris property as a replacement home, when the house William built burned in the early 1900s. The property was purchased and remodeled by Mr. Dick Morgan and has remained in the Morgan family as the geographical homeplace.

The property was passed from Mr. Dick Morgan to his son, Harvey Logan Morgan and his wife Nora Shelton Morgan, and to their son James Coleman Morgan who resides at the home today with his wife Nancy Morgan.
