= Logan Henderson Farm =

Historic house in Tennessee, United States

- U.S. National Register of Historic Places
- U.S. Historic district
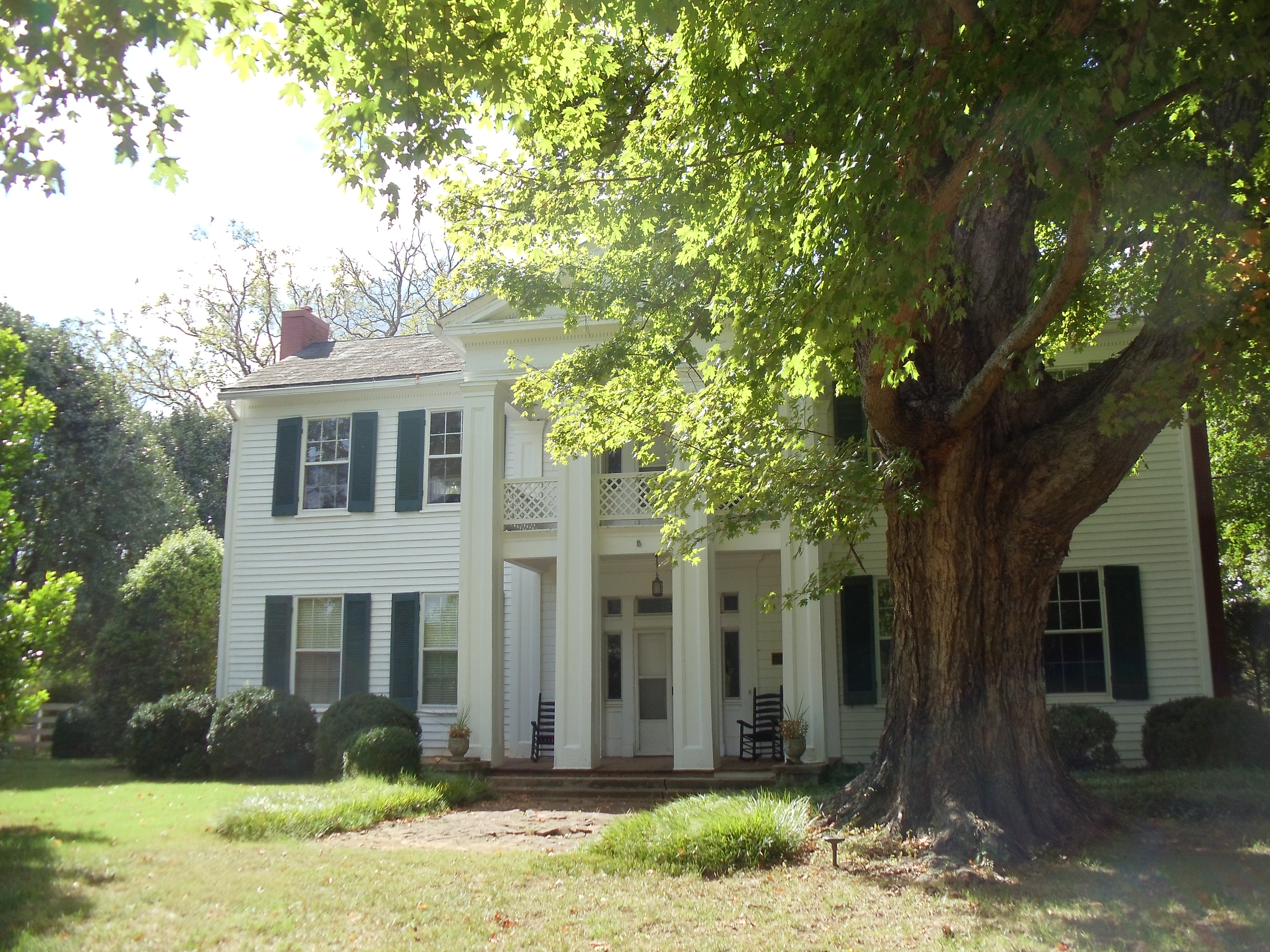
- The Logan Henderson Farm in 2014

- Location within Tennessee Location within the United States
- Nearest city: Murfreesboro, Tennessee
- Coordinates: 35°47′27″N 86°21′25″W
- Area: 9.8 acres (4.0 ha)
- Built: 1816
- Architectural style: Greek Revival, I-house
- MPS: Historic Family Farms in Middle Tennessee MPS
- NRHP reference No.: 03000971
- Added to NRHP: September 25, 2003

The Logan Henderson Farm, also known as Farmington, is a historic farm house in Murfreesboro, Tennessee, U.S.. Built as a slave plantation in the Antebellum South, it later became a dairy and cattle farm. It is now a horse farm.

== History ==
The house was first built for Logan Henderson and his wife, Margaret Ewart Johnston, in 1816, and extended in 1842. The Johnsons grew cotton and corn; they also raised cattle and swine. They owned 21 slaves in 1820 and 50 slaves in 1840. Upon marrying William F. Lytle, the Hendersons's daughter, Violet, inherited 5 slaves. In 1846, the property was inherited by the Hendersons's son, James Franklin Henderson, who lived there with his wife Amanda and their nine children.

James Franklin Henderson was a Whig, which explains why the house was not destroyed during the American Civil War of 1861–1865. The Hendersons invited both Mrs Braxton Bragg and Mrs William Starke Rosecrans, the spouses of Confederate and Union generals.

The house was purchased by Henry Pfeil in 1897. When his daughter married William A. Snell, the couple turned it into a dairy farm. In 1966, it was acquired by Price Harrison, who raised Angus cattle. By 2003, it had become a horse farm.

== Architectural significance ==
The house was designed in the Greek Revival architectural style. It has been listed on the National Register of Historic Places since September 25, 2003.
