= Murray Farm =

Historic house in Tennessee, United States

- U.S. National Register of Historic Places
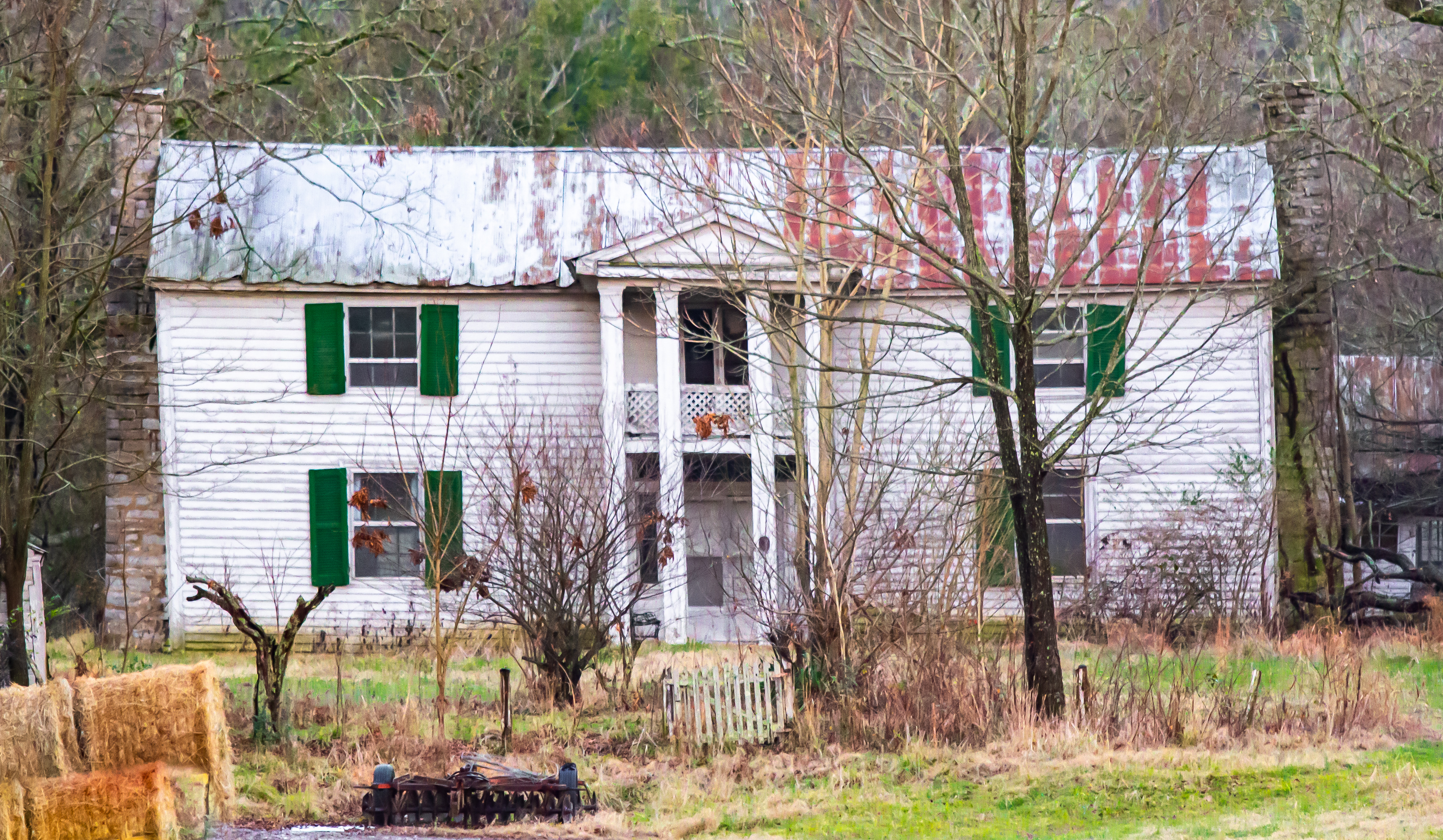
- Nearest city: Readyville, Tennessee
- Area: 127 acres (51 ha)
- Built: 1823
- Architectural style: Greek Revival, I-house
- NRHP reference No.: 91000980
- Added to NRHP: July 31, 1991

Murray Farm is a historic farmhouse in Readyville, Tennessee, U.S..

== History ==
The farm was founded in the 1820s for William H. Murray, a corn and livestock farmer who owned 20 slaves by 1850. It was passed on to his son Hiram in 1851, who owned 39 slaves prior to the American Civil War of 1861–1865. Hiram served in the Confederate States Army, and some of his slaves became tenant farmers in the postbellum era. By 1874, the farm was inherited by his Hiram's son, Davis, who lived here with his wife and their six children.

== Architectural significance ==
The house was designed in the I-house style. A portico designed in the Greek Revival architectural style was added in 1851. It has been listed on the National Register of Historic Places since July 31, 1991.
