= Stones River =

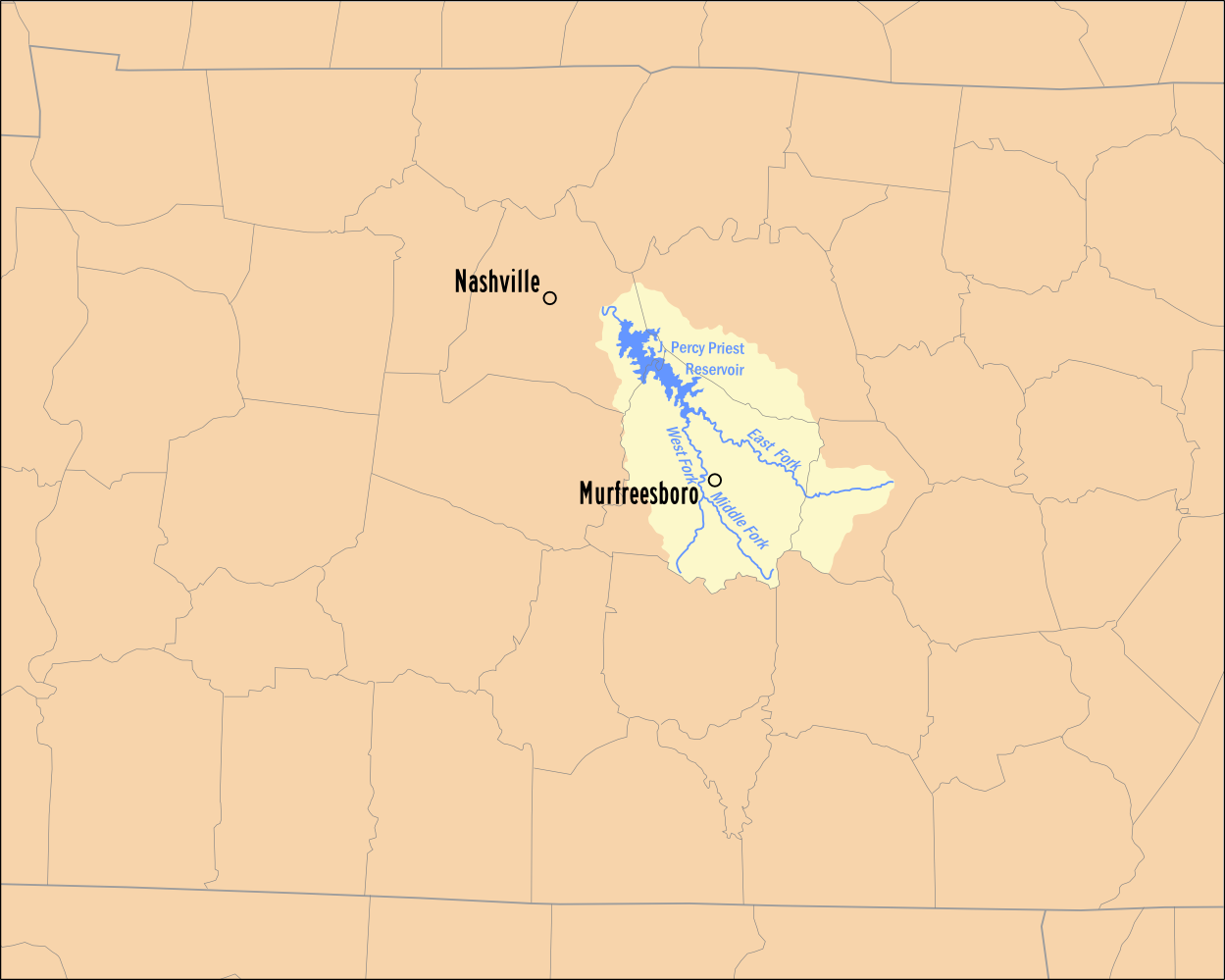
- Map of the Stones River Watershed

Location
- Country: United States

Physical characteristics
- Source
  - location: East Fork – Short Mountain (Cannon County); Middle Fork – Hoovers Gap (Rutherford County); West Fork – Tennessee Valley Divide (Rutherford County)
  - elevation: East Fork - 1,120 feet (341.4 m); Middle Fork - 923 feet (281.3 m); West Fork - 792 feet (241.4 m)
- Mouth
  - location: Cumberland River near Nashville
  - coordinates: 36°11′30″N 86°39′45″W
  - elevation: 413 feet (125.9 m)
- Length: Main River - 32.4 miles (52.1 km); East Fork - 54.0 miles (86.9 km); Middle Fork - 19.8 miles (31.9 km); West Fork - 39.1 miles (62.9 km)
- Basin size: 921 mi^{2} (2,390 km^{2})

The Stones River (properly spelled Stone's River) is a major stream of the eastern portion of Tennessee's Nashville Basin region and a tributary of the Cumberland River. It is named after explorer and longhunter Uriah Stone, who navigated the river in 1767.

== Geography and hydrography ==
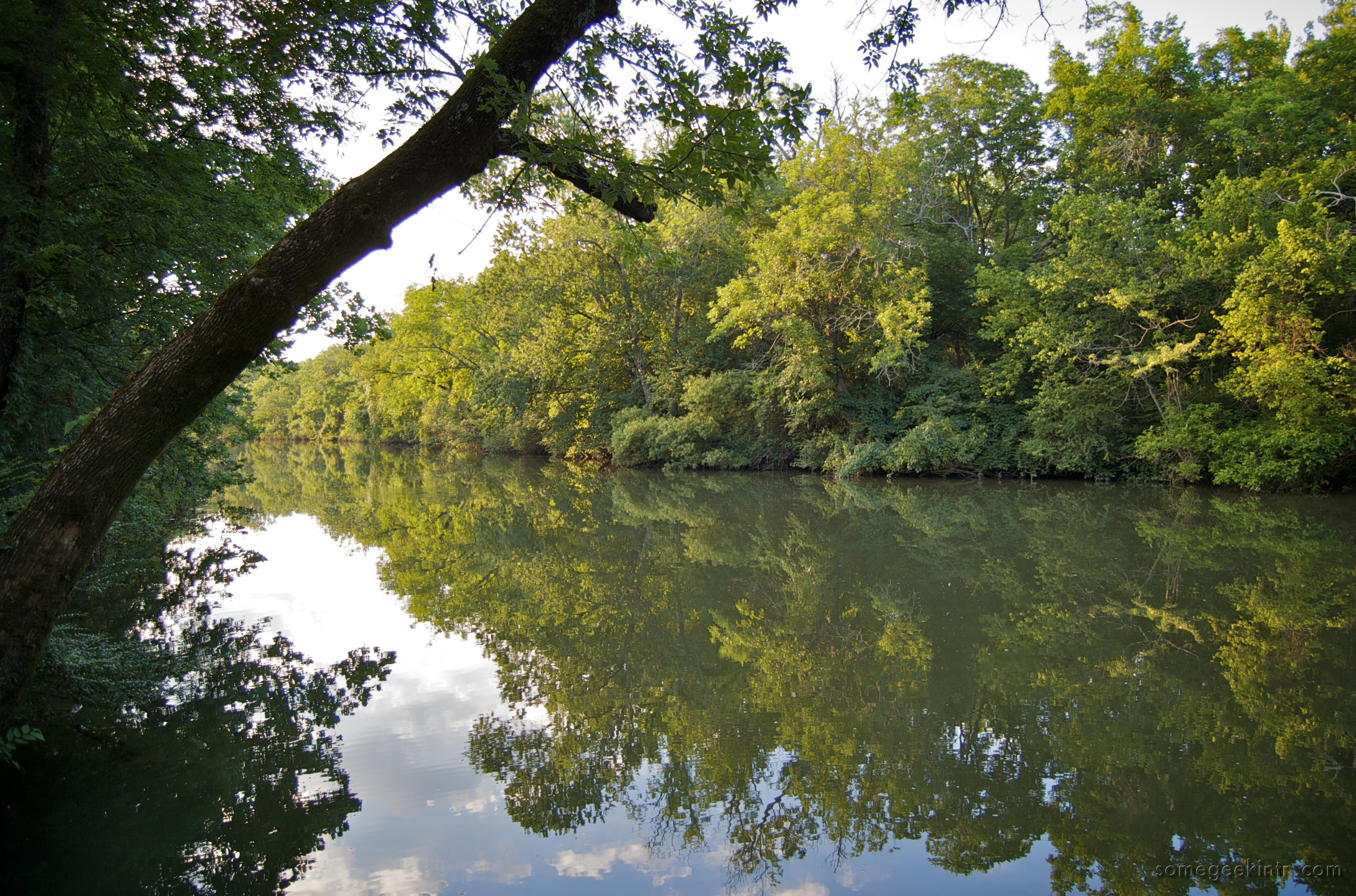
Stones River along the Murfreesboro Greenway

The Stones River is composed of three major forks: the West, Middle, and East forks. The West Fork, 39.1 miles (62.9 km) long, rises in southernmost Rutherford County near the Bedford County line. The upstream portion of its course runs roughly parallel to U.S. Highway 231. The Middle Fork, 19.8 miles (31.9 km) long, rises in an area of low hills, or knobs, also near the line with Bedford County, near Hoovers Gap, an important troop movement route during the American Civil War. It flows roughly parallel to, but west of, Interstate 24 and U.S. Highway 41, and is met by the West Fork near State Route 99. The East Fork is the longest, at 54.0 miles (86.9 km); it rises in Cannon County on Short Mountain, an outlier of the Cumberland Plateau, and flows through Woodbury, the county seat. This stream is roughly paralleled by U.S. Route 70S.

The West Fork runs just west of downtown Murfreesboro. Just northwest of Murfreesboro along the West Fork is the Stones River National Battlefield, site of the Battle of Stones River, a major Civil War battle that was fought from December 31, 1862, to January 2, 1863. The East Fork runs well to the north of Murfreesboro, adjacent to the grounds of the Alvin C. York Veterans Affairs hospital, and is crossed by U.S. Highway 231 near the community of Walterhill, site of a former hydroelectric dam used for a power supply for the surrounding area before the advent of the Tennessee Valley Authority. Near this site is a gigantic landfill operated by Browning-Ferris Industries.

=== Reservoir ===
The confluence of the two major forks occurs in northeastern Rutherford County near Smyrna. At the confluence, both are already somewhat slack because of the impoundment of J. Percy Priest Dam, a United States Army Corps of Engineers development constructed during the 1960s and named for a former Nashville Congressman. The impoundment of the reservoir led to major changes in residential growth patterns in Nashville during the late 1960s and 1970s because people desired to live near the lake, which is highly developed with boat ramps, marinas, parks and other recreational areas, campgrounds, and even an artificial beach area.

In 1979, the dam was bombed with dynamite as ruse to cover a crime spree supposed to have taken place in the resultant massive flooding. The conspirators succeeded only in destroying some iron doors at the dam's base. The suspects were later convicted and sentenced to substantial prison terms.

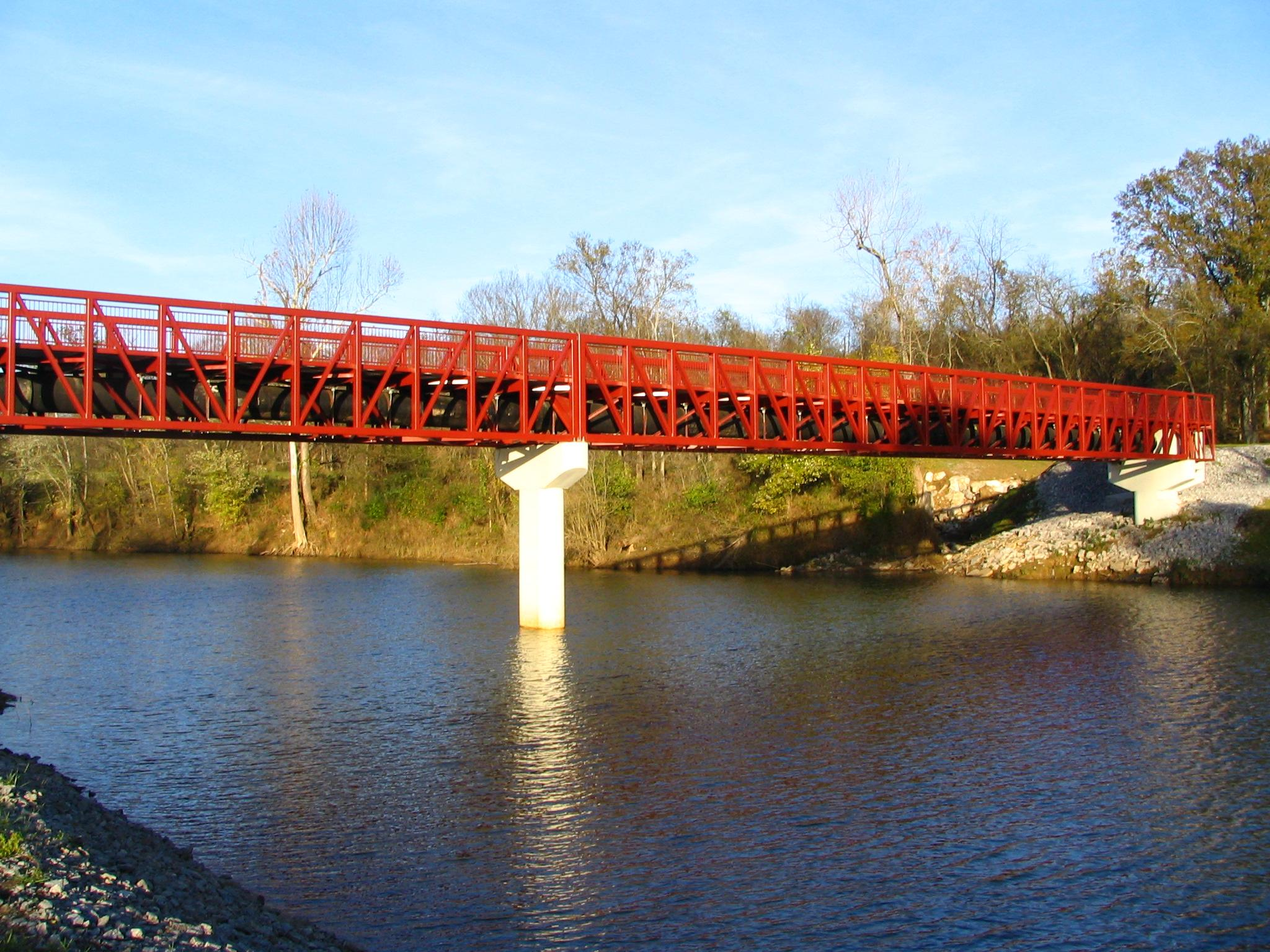
The Stone Rivers Pedestrian Greenway Bridge in Nashville

The dam is visible from the bridge just below it on Interstate 40; just below the dam is a desirable fishing area under certain discharge conditions, but in recent years access has at times been limited because of security concerns. Also just below the dam is the trail-head of the Stones River Greenway, an important part of the Nashville Greenways Project.

=== Tailwaters ===
Between Percy Priest Dam and the mouth of the Stones River, the river flows through Clover Bottom, a large floodplain and site of a former plantation whose Clover Bottom Mansion house, after many years of disuse, neglect, and vandalism, is now the headquarters for the Tennessee Historical Commission. "Clover Bottom" was once the name of a nearby custodial school for mentally disabled children and adults. The immediate area is also the site of a state mental hospital and the Tennessee School for the Blind. Clover Bottom is also the separation of the Nashville neighborhoods of Donelson and Hermitage.

Near the mouth of the Stones River into the Cumberland River, below the bridge on U.S. Highway 70, is a private golf club. The Stones River is now thought of primarily in terms of its major impoundment, Percy Priest Lake, and is important to the Nashville area. The flood control provided by the dam has been important to the reduction of flooding downstream in the downtown Nashville area, as well as in the entire Cumberland Valley.

== See also ==
- List of rivers of Tennessee
