= Lascassas, Tennessee =

Unincorporated community in Tennessee, US

Coordinates: 35°55′49″N 86°17′28″W

Lascassas (also Las Casas or Las Cassas) is a Town in Rutherford County, Tennessee, near the city of Murfreesboro. Its geographic coordinates are 35°55'49"N, 86°17'28"W. The ZIP Code for Lascassas is 37085.

The community's namesake is Bartolomé de las Casas (1484–1566), a Spanish missionary on Christopher Columbus's third expedition who was known as the "Apostle of the Indians" in recognition of his efforts to protect the native population from slavery and abuse.

Lascassas is the site of a public elementary school operated by the Rutherford County school district and enrolling students from pre-kindergarten through grade 5. As of 2024, current enrollment is about 611 students.

The American actor John M. Pickard was born in Lascassas and died in Rutherford County.
