= Walterhill, Tennessee =

- Town
- Location of Walterhill, Tennessee
- Coordinates: 35°58′14″N 86°23′9″W
- Country: United States
- State: Tennessee
- County: Rutherford

Area
  - Total: 3.01 sq mi (7.79 km^{2})
  - Land: 3.01 sq mi (7.79 km^{2})
  - Water: 0 sq mi (0.00 km^{2})
- Elevation: 545 ft (166 m)

Population (2020)
  - Total: 407
  - Density: 135.4/sq mi (52.28/km^{2})
- Time zone: UTC-6 (Central (CST))
  - Summer (DST): UTC-5 (CDT)
- FIPS code: 47-77980
- GNIS feature ID: 1304364

Walterhill, also known as Walter Hill, is a Town in Rutherford County, Tennessee. The population was 401 at the 2010 census.

Walterhill is the site of the 34-acre (140,000 m^{2}) Walterhill Floodplain State Natural Area, established to support a rare plant species found in the Stones River floodplain, the Stones River bladderpod (Paysonia stonensis). Walterhill is best known in the local area for being the site of Allied Waste Industries' Middle Point landfill.

== Geography ==
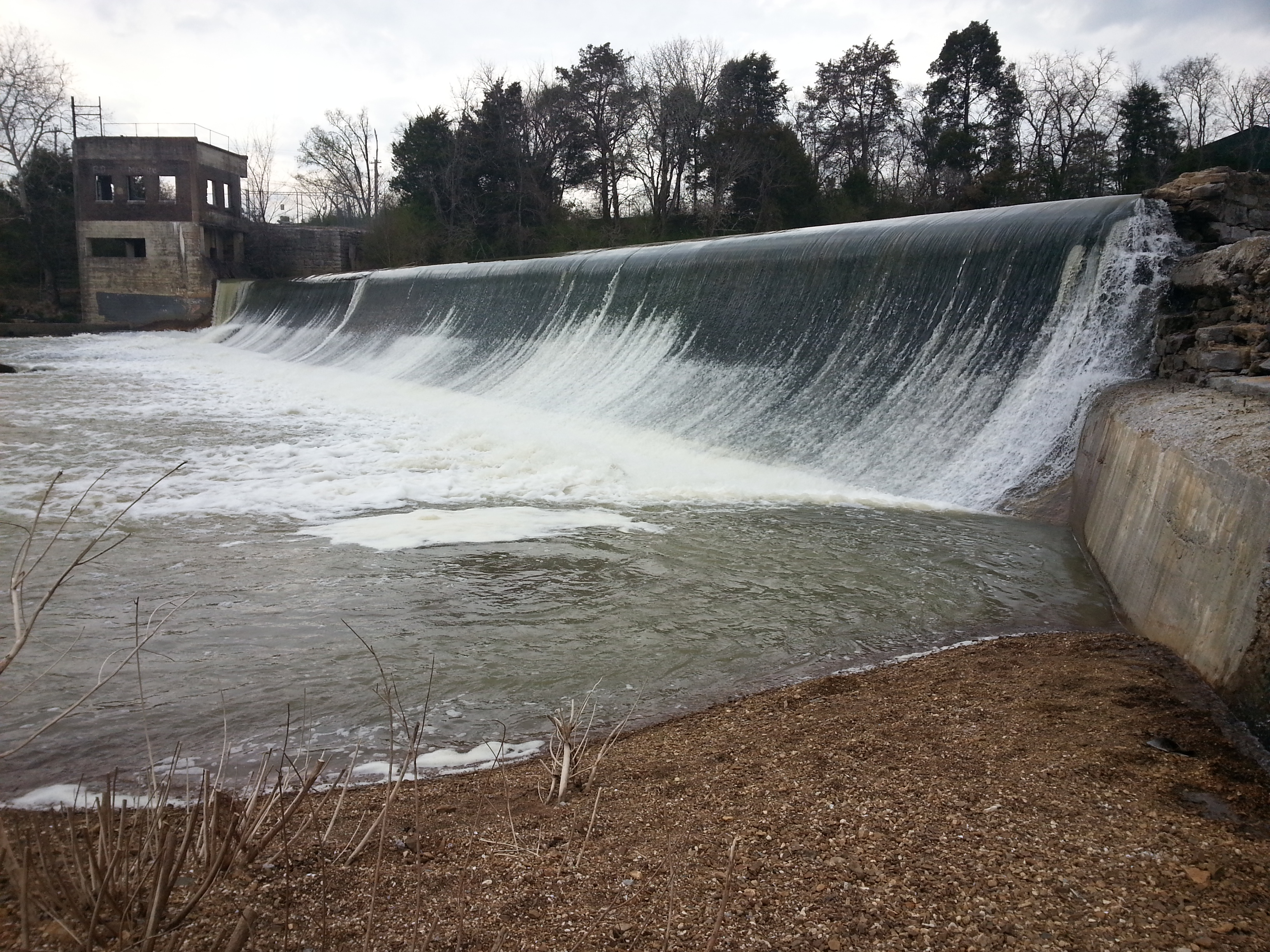
Walter Hill dam is situated on the East Fork of Stones River. The remains of the early 1900s hydroelectric station can be seen on the left.

Walterhill is located at 35°58′14″N 86°23′9″W (35.970674, -86.385838).

According to the United States Census Bureau, the CDP has a total area of 3.0 square miles (7.8 km^{2}), all land.

== Demographics ==
Historical population
Census	Pop.	Note	%±
2020	407		—
U.S. Decennial Census

As of the census of 2000, there were 1,523 people, 525 households, and 431 families residing in the CDP. The population density was 262.0 inhabitants per square mile (101.2/km^{2}). There were 541 housing units at an average density of 93.1 per square mile (35.9/km^{2}). The racial makeup of the CDP was 91.46% White, 6.63% African American, 0.20% Native American, 0.26% Asian, 0.07% Pacific Islander, 0.59% from other races, and 0.79% from two or more races. Hispanic or Latino of any race were 0.79% of the population.

There were 525 households, out of which 43.4% had children under the age of 18 living with them, 68.8% were married couples living together, 10.3% had a female householder with no husband present, and 17.9% were non-families. 15.0% of all households were made up of individuals, and 4.6% had someone living alone who was 65 years of age or older. The average household size was 2.90 and the average family size was 3.23.

In the CDP, the population was spread out, with 28.8% under the age of 18, 7.6% from 18 to 24, 33.3% from 25 to 44, 22.8% from 45 to 64, and 7.5% who were 65 years of age or older. The median age was 36 years. For every 100 females, there were 101.7 males. For every 100 females age 18 and over, there were 99.3 males.

The median income for a household in the CDP was $58,438, and the median income for a family was $61,111. Males had a median income of $42,372 versus $27,279 for females. The per capita income for the CDP was $22,419. About 3.2% of families and 3.3% of the population were below the poverty line, including 4.1% of those under age 18 and 10.9% of those age 65 or over.
