= Eagleville, Tennessee =

Eagleville
- City
- Eagleville, Tennessee
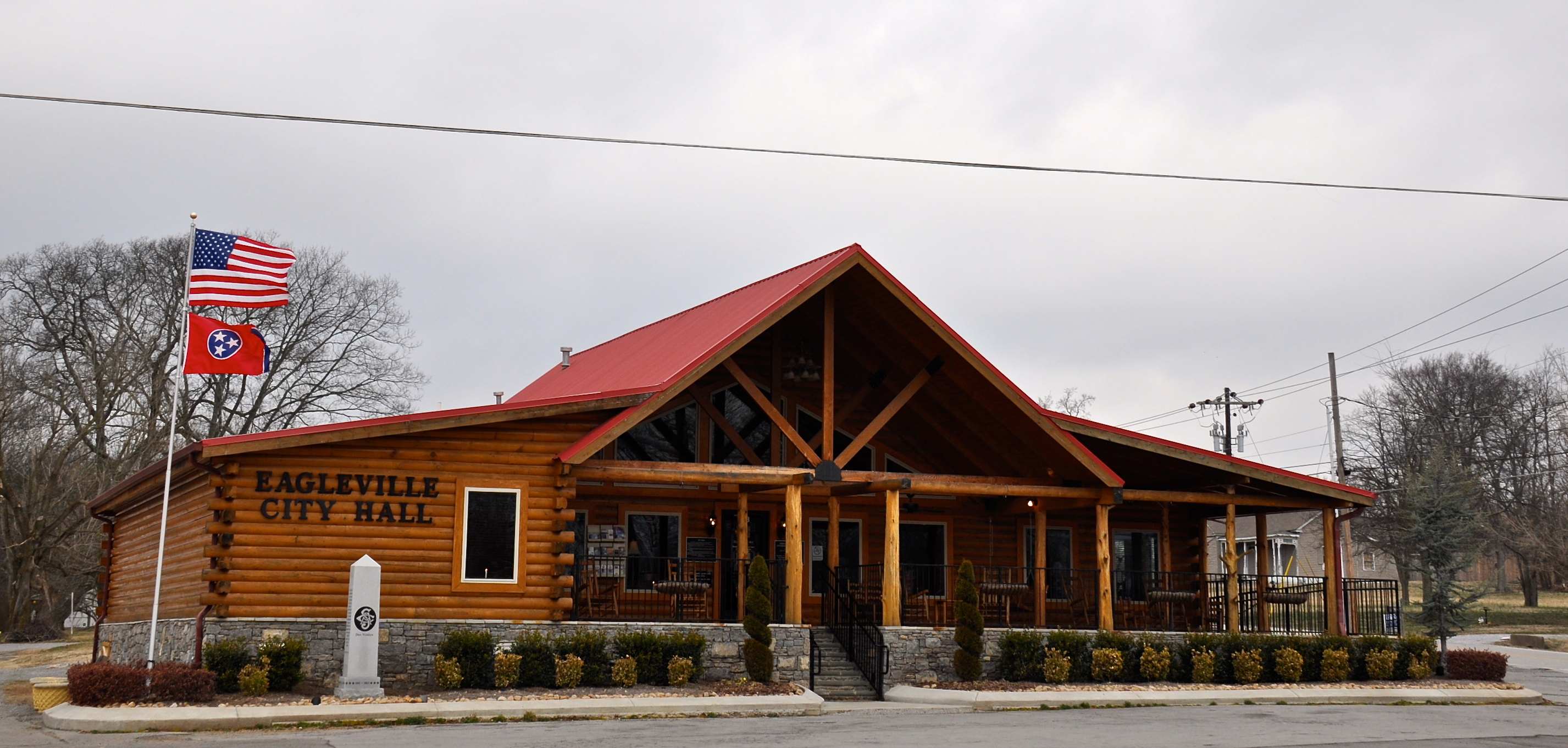
- Eagleville City Hall, March 2014
- Motto: Where the front porch rockers aren't just for show
- Location of Eagleville in Rutherford County, Tennessee.
- Coordinates: 35°44′28″N 86°39′4″W
- Country: United States
- State: Tennessee
- County: Rutherford
- Settled: 1790
- Founded: 1832
- Incorporated: 1977

Government
  - Type: Mayor-Council
  - Mayor: Chad Leeman
  - Vice Mayor: Bill Tollet

Area
  - Total: 2.88 sq mi (7.47 km^{2})
  - Land: 2.88 sq mi (7.47 km^{2})
  - Water: 0 sq mi (0.00 km^{2})
- Elevation: 771 ft (235 m)

Population (2020)
  - Total: 813
  - Density: 282/sq mi (108.8/km^{2})
- Time zone: UTC-6 (Central (CST))
  - Summer (DST): UTC-5 (CDT)
- ZIP code: 37060
- Area code: 615
- FIPS code: 47-22360
- GNIS feature ID: 1283301
- Website: eaglevilletn.com

Eagleville is a city in Rutherford County, Tennessee. The population was 813 at the 2020 census. It is the home of Eagleville High school.

== History ==
Eagleville was founded in 1832 and was originally named "Manchester." When a post office opened in town in 1836, the city changed its name to "Eagleville," since the name Manchester was already taken. According to local lore, the name was inspired by an unusually large eagle which was killed in the vicinity. Eagleville was part of Williamson County until 1877, when it agreed to join Rutherford after Williamson County refused to build a road connecting Eagleville with Franklin, the county seat. In 2015, Eagleville completed its sewer system. The $3.1 million project was financed by a low-interest loan and a grant from the United States Department of Agriculture (USDA).

== Geography ==
According to the United States Census Bureau, the city has a total area of 2.1 square miles (5.4 km^{2}), all land. Eagleville is located at 35.7417° N, 86.6497° W

== Demographics ==
Historical population
Census	Pop.	Note	%±
1880	134		—
1890	275		105.2%
1950	378		—
1960	363		−4.0%
1970	437		20.4%
1980	444		1.6%
1990	462		4.1%
2000	464		0.4%
2010	604		30.2%
2020	813		34.6%

As of the 2020 census, the city had a population of 813.

=== 2020 census ===
The median age was 37.6 years, 27.3% of residents were under the age of 18, 14.4% of residents were 65 years of age or older, and for every 100 females there were 87.8 males with 86.4 males age 18 and over.

0.0% of residents lived in urban areas, while 100.0% lived in rural areas.

There were 301 households in Eagleville, of which 43.5% had children under the age of 18 living in them. Of all households, 53.5% were married-couple households, 16.6% were households with a male householder and no spouse or partner present, and 27.2% were households with a female householder and no spouse or partner present. About 26.6% of all households were made up of individuals and 12.6% had someone living alone who was 65 years of age or older.

There were 326 housing units, of which 7.7% were vacant. The homeowner vacancy rate was 0.0% and the rental vacancy rate was 11.4%.

Racial composition as of the 2020 census
Race	Number	Percent
White	743	91.4%
Black or African American	17	2.1%
American Indian and Alaska Native	0	0.0%
Asian	0	0.0%
Native Hawaiian and Other Pacific Islander	0	0.0%
Some other race	12	1.5%
Two or more races	41	5.0%
Hispanic or Latino (of any race)	39	4.8%

=== 2000 census ===
As of the census of 2000, there were 464 people, 187 households, and 134 families living in the city. The population density was 218.1 inhabitants per square mile (84.2/km^{2}). There were 198 housing units at an average density of 93.1 units per square mile (35.9 units/km^{2}). The racial makeup of the city was 97.84% White, 1.29% African American, 0.43% Native American, and 0.43% from two or more races. Hispanic or Latino of any race were 0.86% of the population.

There were 187 households, out of which 29.4% had children under the age of 18 living with them, 57.2% were married couples living together, 8.6% had a female householder with no husband present, and 28.3% were non-families. Of all households, 24.6% were made up of individuals, and 13.4% had someone living alone who was 65 years of age or older. The average household size was 2.48 and the average family size was 2.94.

In the city the population was spread out, with 24.1% under the age of 18, 9.7% from 18 to 24, 28.0% from 25 to 44, 24.1% from 45 to 64, and 14.0% who were 65 years of age or older. The median age was 39 years. For every 100 females, there were 92.5 males. For every 100 females age 18 and over, there were 93.4 males.

The median income for a household in the city was $47,500, and the median income for a family was $63,542. Males had a median income of $36,250 versus $25,000 for females. The per capita income for the city was $21,915. About 5.3% of families and 4.3% of the population were below the poverty line, including 1.0% of those under age 18 and 4.3% of those age 65 or over.
