= List of tornadoes in the outbreak of March 31 – April 1, 2023 =

Third most active tornado outbreak on record

Between March 31 – April 1, 2023, a large and destructive tornado outbreak occurred across the Midwestern, Southern and Eastern United States. The total number of tornadoes confirmed from the outbreak is 146.

== Confirmed tornadoes ==
Daily statistics
Date	Total	EFU	EF0	EF1	EF2	EF3	EF4	EF5	Deaths	Injuries
March 31	115	9	34	36	26	9	1	0	23	210+
April 1	31	0	11	12	6	2	0	0	3	8+
Total	146	9	45	48	32	11	1	0	26	218+

=== March 31 event ===
List of confirmed tornadoes – Friday, March 31, 2023 (Note: All dates are based on the local time zone where the tornado touched down; however, all times are in Coordinated Universal Time for consistency.)
EF#	Location	County / parish	State	Start coord.	Time (UTC)	Path length	Max. width
EF3	Little Rock to Jacksonville to SE of Cabot	Pulaski, Lonoke	AR	34.7251°N 92.4824°W	19:18–19:58	34.23 mi (55.09 km)	800 yd (730 m)
EF3	See article on this tornado – 54 people were injured.						
EFU	SE of Banner	Tazewell	IL	40.4736°N 89.8701°W	19:37–19:38	0.25 mi (0.40 km)	10 yd (9.1 m)
EFU	A brief tornado was observed by weather spotters and caused no damage.						
EF1	NW of Deer Creek	Tazewell	IL	40.63°N 89.35°W	20:15–20:16	0.87 mi (1.40 km)	10 yd (9.1 m)
EF1	A barn was damaged before the tornado dissipated in a field.						
EFU	E of Eureka	Woodford	IL	40.72°N 89.22°W	20:23–20:24	0.59 mi (0.95 km)	20 yd (18 m)
EFU	A storm chaser recorded a tornado that caused no damage through an open field.						
EF3	E of Dahlonega to SW of Keota	Wapello, Keokuk	IA	41.0615°N 92.3334°W	20:36–21:15	26.09 mi (41.99 km)	1,000 yd (910 m)
EF3	A high-end, intense EF3 tornado began northeast of Ottumwa and caused major structural damage, destroying a mobile home and tearing the roof and an exterior wall off a house, with debris failure likely starting at the garage. Two well-anchored hog confinement buildings were completely destroyed. A well-built brick home later in the path received roof and window damage but remained structurally sound. Near the Wapello-Keokuk county line, an older unanchored house was pushed off its foundation and collapsed, while nearby trees and a propane tank showed little damage. As the tornado continued into Keokuk County southeast of Martinsburg and tracked toward IA 92, it produced intense damage to a home and caused additional severe damage to farmsteads and outbuildings before lifting southwest of Keota.						
EF1	WSW of Des Arc	Prairie	AR	34.9457°N 91.6692°W	20:45–20:46	1.1 mi (1.8 km)	100 yd (91 m)
EF1	This tornado began in an open field southwest of AR 86, where it snapped a power pole. It then crossed over a barn and lifted the barn’s roof. As it continued north, the tornado removed shingles from a nearby house before lifting shortly afterward.						
EFU	SE of Malcom	Poweshiek	IA	41.6489°N 92.544°W	20:52–20:57	3.58 mi (5.76 km)	60 yd (55 m)
EFU	A tornado was recorded by local broadcast media as it tracked through fields.						
EFU	N of Pontiac	Livingston	IL	40.9559°N 88.6529°W	21:05–21:06	0.03 mi (0.048 km)	15 yd (14 m)
EFU	This very brief tornado kicked up some dirt and caused no damage.						
EF4	SW of Keota to NW of Amish	Keokuk, Washington, Iowa, Johnson	IA	41.31°N 92.03°W	21:10–21:37	19.9 mi (32.0 km)	700 yd (640 m)
EF4	See section on this tornado – 3 people were injured						
EF1	ENE of Cleves to SW of Aplington	Grundy	IA	42.4931°N 92.9753°W	21:22–21:28	3.53 mi (5.68 km)	80 yd (73 m)
EF1	Several trees and outbuildings were damaged.						
EF1	N of Wellsburg to S of Aplington	Grundy	IA	42.4742°N 92.9402°W	21:22–21:29	4.14 mi (6.66 km)	80 yd (73 m)
EF1	This tornado damaged a grain bin, an outbuilding, multiple trees and power poles.						
EF3	SE of Fair Oaks, AR to Wynne, AR to Southern Gilt Edge, TN to S of Burlison, TN	Cross (AR), Crittenden (AR), Tipton (TN), Mississippi (AR)	AR, TN	35.1818°N 90.9611°W	21:30–22:54	72.55 mi (116.76 km)	1,600 yd (1,500 m)
EF3	4 deaths – See article on this tornado – 26 people were injured.						
EF2	NW of Vinton	Benton	IA	42.18°N 92.09°W	21:36–21:39	1.7 mi (2.7 km)	50 yd (46 m)
EF2	This strong tornado inflicted significant damage to farm buildings, trees, and power poles.						
EF0	SW of Amish to ESE of Windham	Johnson	IA	41.53°N 91.79°W	21:37–21:46	6.1 mi (9.8 km)	50 yd (46 m)
EF0	A few farm outbuildings were damaged.						
EF2	NW of Urbana to ENE of Brandon	Benton, Buchanan	IA	42.26°N 91.93°W	21:47–21:54	4.87 mi (7.84 km)	50 yd (46 m)
EF2	A low-end EF2 tornado caused significant damage to trees, farm buildings, and a house.						
EF2	ESE of Cosgrove to Coralville to Solon	Johnson	IA	41.63°N 91.69°W	21:48–22:08	16.93 mi (27.25 km)	75 yd (69 m)
EF2	This strong tornado formed southwest of Coralville and crossed US 218, damaging a warehouse near US 6 and flipping several trailers and a truck. A nearby retail building lost part of its roof, and multiple vehicles were rolled. The tornado moved into a residential area, snapping and uprooting many trees, with at least two reported injuries. Damage became more scattered before the tornado intensified again as it crossed Coralville Lake. A concentrated damage path began near a campground east of North Liberty and continued toward Solon, where a radio tower collapsed and part of a home’s roof was removed. The tornado then moved into open fields, destroying an outbuilding and lofting debris, including driving a 2×4 into the ground. It entered Solon, uprooting trees, bending street signs, and destroying another outbuilding before dissipating just after exiting the town.						
EF2	Alco to N of Newnata	Stone	AR	35.8855°N 92.3665°W	21:49–21:57	6.8 mi (10.9 km)	125 yd (114 m)
EF2	A low-end EF2 tornado first touched down in Alco, where a couple of homes and outbuildings had roofing blown off. The tornado exited town and reached its peak intensity as a one-story home was pushed off its block foundation and sustained roof and exterior wall loss. Elsewhere, minor damage to a house and an outbuilding occurred, and trees were downed before the tornado dissipated.						
EFU	NW of Urbana	Benton	IA	42.2456°N 91.9223°W	21:51–21:53	1.35 mi (2.17 km)	10 yd (9.1 m)
EFU	A tornado scar was noted in fields using high-resolution satellite imagery.						
EF2	Hills to Southeastern Iowa City to S of Oasis	Johnson	IA	41.54°N 91.56°W	21:53–22:08	14.69 mi (23.64 km)	100 yd (91 m)
EF2	This strong tornado began southwest of Hills and moved northeast, crossing US 218 through the northwest side of town. It destroyed several outbuildings, large trees, and damaged trim and siding on homes. The worst damage occurred in western Hills, where multiple roofs were completely torn off, siding was stripped from several houses, and a large outbuilding was destroyed. The tornado then moved through a wooded area, snapping numerous trees, before continuing northeast and damaging siding and roofs on several homes on the far southeast side of Iowa City. It crossed I-80 and lifted shortly afterward.						
EFU	SE of Rowley	Buchanan	IA	42.3472°N 91.8244°W	22:03–22:05	1.66 mi (2.67 km)	10 yd (9.1 m)
EFU	High-resolution satellite imagery showed a tornado scar in fields.						
EF0	Southern West Branch to S of Cedar Valley	Cedar	IA	41.64°N 91.36°W	22:06–22:16	8.3 mi (13.4 km)	10 yd (9.1 m)
EF0	This weak tornado caused no damage until the end of its path, where some trees were slightly damaged.						
EF2	Northwestern Solon to Southern Mount Vernon	Johnson, Linn	IA	41.81°N 91.51°W	22:06–22:18	8.97 mi (14.44 km)	75 yd (69 m)
EF2	A strong tornado formed and clipped northwest side of Solon as it moved northeast, snapping and uprooting trees and tearing part of a shed roof. A nearby farmstead lost two large outbuildings and grain silos, and power poles were snapped in open fields. As it approached the Johnson-Linn county line, numerous trees were downed and some were rolled into a field, while one house sustained minor shingle damage and broken windows. The tornado crossed into Linn County and continued northeast, causing additional tree, roof, and outbuilding damage before dissipating in the southern part of Mount Vernon.						
EF2	W of Tipton to S of Oxford Mills	Cedar	IA	41.76°N 91.17°W	22:14–22:38	16.42 mi (26.43 km)	250 yd (230 m)
EF2	This strong tornado touched down just west of Tipton, where it tore the roof off a house and uprooted large trees. It moved northeast toward the Clarence area, snapping power poles and causing significant damage to multiple outbuildings. The tornado lifted just south of the Cedar–Jones county line.						
EFU	NW of Bloomfield	Scott	IL	39.66°N 90.58°W	22:15–22:17	0.53 mi (0.85 km)	10 yd (9.1 m)
EFU	A storm spotter observed a tornado moving through the Illinois River bottoms. No damage occurred.						
EF1	SE of Cedar Valley to Southwestern Tipton	Cedar	IA	41.71°N 91.21°W	22:17–22:23	5.2 mi (8.4 km)	100 yd (91 m)
EF1	A high-end EF1 tornado damaged outbuildings and homes.						
EF2	Lime City to NNW of Big Rock	Cedar, Scott, Clinton	IA	41.62°N 91.14°W	22:18–22:40	19.56 mi (31.48 km)	200 yd (180 m)
EF2	This strong tornado touched down north of Atalissa and immediately snapped power poles and large trees along its path. It caused significant damage to two homes southwest of Bennett and flipped a semi-truck on I-80. Several concrete block silos south of Bennett were also damaged. The tornado then continued northeast through rural areas with sporadic tree damage before clipping northwest Scott County, then into Clinton County, where it dissipated south of Wheatland.						
EF1	Manchester	Delaware	IA	42.442°N 91.499°W	22:20–22:28	4.1 mi (6.6 km)	50 yd (46 m)
EF1	A high-end EF1 tornado touched down southwest of Manchester, causing damage to farms and trees. It then moved northeast directly into town, heavily damaging some industrial buildings and destroying a small outbuilding. Large trees were uprooted and power lines were downed as well.						
EFU	E of Chapin	Morgan	IL	39.7671°N 90.3526°W	22:27–22:28	0.73 mi (1.17 km)	10 yd (9.1 m)
EFU	A brief tornado occurred. No damage was noted.						
EF1	SW of Oneida to WNW of Colesburg	Delaware, Clayton	IA	42.525°N 91.372°W	22:32–22:47	11.1 mi (17.9 km)	90 yd (82 m)
EF1	A high-end EF1 tornado formed moved northeast. Along its path, it damaged several farm outbuildings, snapped trees, and left visible scour marks in fields confirmed by high-resolution satellite imagery. The tornado continued northeast to the west of Colesburg before dissipating.						
EF0	N of Jacksonville	Morgan	IL	39.81°N 90.23°W	22:35–22:36	1.06 mi (1.71 km)	30 yd (27 m)
EF0	Minor tree damage occurred.						
EF1	Eastern Wyoming	Jones	IA	42.0541°N 91.0072°W	22:41–22:43	1.37 mi (2.20 km)	50 yd (46 m)
EF1	A tornado touched down south of Wyoming and moved across the east side of town, snapping at least two trees and causing additional tree damage along its path. Pieces of twisted metal were lofted and deposited in the fire department parking lot.						
EF2	Mediapolis	Des Moines	IA	41.0011°N 91.1708°W	22:41–22:43	0.95 mi (1.53 km)	150 yd (140 m)
EF2	This brief but strong tornado moved east across the southern part of Mediapolis, tearing siding and shingles from several homes and businesses. Large tree limbs fell onto mobile homes and frame houses, causing roof and siding damage. Near the center of town, the tornado briefly intensified, producing strong damage by removing the entire roof from one home and snapping several large trees near the base. It quickly weakened and dissipated on the east side of town.						
EF3	NW of Munford to Southern Covington to SE of Belle Eagle	Tipton, Haywood	TN	35.4621°N 89.8323°W	22:48–23:29	39.18 mi (63.05 km)	2,000 yd (1,800 m)
EF3	1 death – See section on this tornado – 28 people were injured.						
EF2	Grand Mound to Charlotte to NW of Goose Lake	Clinton	IA	41.81°N 90.65°W	22:50–23:10	18.02 mi (29.00 km)	350 yd (320 m)
EF2	A strong tornado touched down in Grand Mound, where trees and power poles were snapped, and roof damage occurred. The tornado exited Grand Mount and damaged a few homes as it continued to the northeast, including one house that was almost completely collapsed after being shifted off its foundation. Three occupants were left trapped inside the house, one of whom suffered minor injuries. Multiple barns and farm buildings were also damaged along this segment of the path. The tornado struck the town of Charlotte, where multiple grain bins, garages, and outbuildings were heavily damaged or destroyed. Homes and other structures in town sustained roof damage, and one building had a brick exterior wall blown out. A large propane tank was ruptured, causing a gas leak that prompted the evacuation of half of the town. Additional tree and outbuilding damage occurred to the northeast of Charlotte before the tornado dissipated.						
EF1	NW of Maquoketa to SW of Fulton	Jackson	IA	42.12°N 90.72°W	22:58–23:01	1.24 mi (2.00 km)	50 yd (46 m)
EF1	Outbuildings on two farmsteads were damaged.						
EF0	N of Andrew	Jackson	IA	42.192°N 90.605°W	23:09–23:10	0.17 mi (0.27 km)	15 yd (14 m)
EF0	A brief tornado destroyed the roof and walls of a shed. Tree branches were damaged as well.						
EF2	Northern Sherman to S of Williamsville	Sangamon	IL	39.896°N 89.6206°W	23:12–23:20	5.42 mi (8.72 km)	400 yd (370 m)
EF2	This high-end EF2 tornado moved through the north side of Sherman, causing major damage as multiple homes had their roofs torn off, a couple of which had their exterior walls collapse. Numerous other homes in town had roofing and siding removed, while outbuilding structures and detached garages were severely damaged. Faith Baptist Church was also damaged, tractor-trailers were flipped, and trees and power poles were downed as well. The tornado exited Sherman and moved to the northeast, damaging two large barns at a horse farm. Some additional outbuildings were damaged, and sheet metal was strewn into fields before the tornado dissipated.						
EF1	S of Bellevue, IA	Jackson (IA), Jo Daviess (IL)	IA, IL	42.2422°N 90.4267°W	23:16–23:29	1.87 mi (3.01 km)	100 yd (91 m)
EF1	This tornado developed south of Bellevue and caused damage to an RV park and some cabins, including a few RVs that were flipped. Three people were injured at the RV park, and trees were damaged or uprooted as well. The tornado then crossed the Mississippi River into Illinois before dissipating.						
EF2	Southeastern Riverton to Latham	Sangamon, Logan	IL	39.8448°N 89.5223°W	23:18–23:46	21.01 mi (33.81 km)	200 yd (180 m)
EF2	A tornado touched down at the southeastern outskirts of Riverton and almost immediately reached its peak intensity, completely tearing the roof off of a business and damaging trees. As it passed north of Dawson and moved through rural areas to the northeast, the tornado weakened significantly and caused only minor outbuilding damage. The tornado entered the town of Latham before it dissipated, inflicting roof shingle damage to a few homes in town.						
EF2	Western Geneseo	Henry	IL	41.42°N 90.23°W	23:24–23:28	3.55 mi (5.71 km)	300 yd (270 m)
EF2	This strong tornado formed to the southwest of Geneseo and moved northeastward, damaging or destroying multiple barns and outbuildings. Grain bins and steel storage tanks were thrown, power poles were snapped, and some ground scouring occurred in farm fields. The tornado then intensified to high-end EF2 strength as it struck the west side of town, destroying multiple metal-framed warehouse buildings. Chain-link fencing was destroyed, and a car was tossed in this area as well. Additional cars were moved and damaged in a parking lot, and some apartment buildings in town sustained roof damage before the tornado abruptly dissipated.						
EF2	N of Atkinson	Henry	IL	41.475°N 90.0584°W	23:33–23:37	3.05 mi (4.91 km)	200 yd (180 m)
EF2	This significant tornado touched down north of Atkinson, completely destroying an outbuilding and scattering its debris into a field. Another outbuilding was damaged, and trees were snapped as well.						
EF2	NNE of Atkinson to NW of Thomas	Henry, Bureau	IL	41.46°N 90°W	23:36–23:47	9.32 mi (15.00 km)	440 yd (400 m)
EF2	A strong tornado developed north of Atkinson and tracked northeast toward Hooppole. Early in its path, a home suffered siding and window damage, while a brick grain silo and an outbuilding were damaged. As the tornado continued, numerous barns, outbuildings, and trees were damaged or destroyed. Near Hooppole, a house lost its entire roof, and additional farm structures were damaged. Toward the end of the track, a grain silo collapsed right before the tornado crossed into Bureau County and dissipated shortly thereafter.						
EF2	Northern Kewanee	Henry	IL	41.23°N 90.02°W	23:37–23:43	6.82 mi (10.98 km)	650 yd (590 m)
EF2	A strong multivortex tornado formed to the west of Kewanee, damaging outbuildings, downing trees and power poles, and blowing an empty grain bin off its foundation. As it moved through the northern edge of Kewanee, the tornado snapped many large trees and several power poles, destroyed a shed, and damaged the roofs of a few homes. The tornado then dissipated at the northeastern outskirts of town.						
EF1	S of Mount Carroll	Carroll	IL	42.0489°N 89.9733°W	22:39–22:42	0.98 mi (1.58 km)	50 yd (46 m)
EF1	Damage occurred to powerlines.						
EF0	E of McVey to SE of Farmersville	Macoupin, Montgomery	IL	39.391°N 89.715°W	23:47–23:53	6.33 mi (10.19 km)	150 yd (140 m)
EF0	This weak tornado touched down and initially damaged a farm building, tearing off part of the roof and driving a plank of wood into the roof of a nearby home. It then moved northeast across open fields and wooded areas before entering Montgomery County. After crossing I-55, the tornado produced minor tree damage along a hedgerow and continued northeast. It later struck a small metal machine shed, lofting debris into adjacent fields and a drainage canal before dissipating shortly thereafter.						
EF1	N of Rewey	Iowa	WI	42.8525°N 90.4002°W	23:48–23:50	1.07 mi (1.72 km)	75 yd (69 m)
EF1	Trees were snapped by a brief tornado, and some outbuildings were heavily damaged or destroyed.						
EF1	NW of New Bedford to NW of Ohio	Bureau, Whiteside, Lee	IL	41.55°N 89.77°W	23:48–00:01	13.88 mi (22.34 km)	150 yd (140 m)
EF1	This high-end EF1 tornado began just south of IL 92 in northwest Bureau County and moved northeast into far southeast Whiteside County. Along its path, it damaged or destroyed multiple farm outbuildings, snapped several power poles, and downed dozens of trees. The most severe damage occurred near the Bureau–Whiteside county line, where a large farmstead outbuilding lost its roof and two walls, with debris thrown far into an adjacent field. The tornado continued several more miles into Lee County, causing additional tree and structural damage before dissipating.						
EF1	E of Platteville to N of Belmont	Lafayette	WI	42.729°N 90.4183°W	23:50–23:55	5.5 mi (8.9 km)	75 yd (69 m)
EF1	Several grain bins and farm buildings were damaged or destroyed, including a small outbuilding that was thrown 100 yd (91 m) into the side of a house. Trees and power poles were snapped, and another house sustained minor damage near the end of the path.						
EF1	ESE of Lanark to WNW of Baileyville	Carroll, Ogle, Stephenson	IL	42.08°N 89.75°W	23:50–00:02	11.01 mi (17.72 km)	200 yd (180 m)
EF1	Numerous farm outbuildings and sheds were destroyed as this tornado struck multiple farmsteads. Several trees were downed as well.						
EF1	N of Belmont to W of Mineral Point	Lafayette, Iowa	WI	42.7964°N 90.3195°W	23:55–00:00	6.59 mi (10.61 km)	75 yd (69 m)
EF1	This tornado formed immediately after the previous tornado dissipated. Multiple barns and farm buildings were damaged or destroyed, and trees were snapped along the path.						
EFU	N of Lexa	Phillips	AR	34.6089°N 90.7929°W	00:03–00:06	2.76 mi (4.44 km)	100 yd (91 m)
EFU	An emergency manager, along with several public weather spotters, observed a tornado that touched down over open fields and crossed AR 1. Although some damage was observed, it was determined that it occurred from straight-line winds and the storm's rear-flank downdraft rather than from the tornado itself. A rating could not be determined as a result.						
EF0	NW of Palmer	Christian	IL	39.4804°N 89.4917°W	00:06–00:08	4.08 mi (6.57 km)	20 yd (18 m)
EF0	A weak tornado damaged the roof of a farm outbuilding and blew a couple of empty grain bins into fields.						
EF2	S of Amboy to NNW of West Brooklyn	Lee	IL	41.6508°N 89.3128°W	00:08–00:18	9.29 mi (14.95 km)	350 yd (320 m)
EF2	A low-end EF2 tornado began in the Woodhaven Lakes campground and damaged multiple campers, including at least two that were rolled. A mobile home was rolled and heavily damaged as well. Large trees were snapped or uprooted, including some that landed on outbuildings and mobile homes. Northeast of the campground, many additional large trees were snapped and stripped of their branches, including two trees that were downed onto a homestead which was largely destroyed, while outbuildings on the property were destroyed as well. A large garage at another residence was also completely demolished by falling trees, and a house lost a large part of its roof. Additional trees and some power poles were downed elsewhere along the path, and a barn was damaged before the tornado dissipated.						
EF1	Southern Sublette to West Brooklyn to WNW of The Burg	Lee	IL	41.6381°N 89.2287°W	00:13–00:21	7.75 mi (12.47 km)	75 yd (69 m)
EF1	This tornado snapped several power poles as it crossed US 52 at the southern edge of Sublette. In rural areas northeast of Sublette, trees were damaged, and an open-air farm building had part of its metal roof torn off, with debris strewn up to 3/4 mi (1.2 km) away. An empty grain bin was pushed off its foundation before the tornado struck West Brooklyn, where a 120 ft (37 m) tall tower was bent in half, and the roof of a bank was blown off, with one of the wooden beams from the roof impaling the roof of a nearby garage. A frail masonry building collapsed, and some trees and power poles were snapped. The tornado then weakened and dissipated northeast of town.						
EF1	S of Taylorville	Christian	IL	39.5°N 89.31°W	19:13–19:14	1.74 mi (2.80 km)	30 yd (27 m)
EF1	Thirty power poles were snapped by this tornado.						
EF0	ESE of Twin Grove to SSW of Juda	Green	WI	42.5229°N 89.5279°W	00:16–00:20	2.95 mi (4.75 km)	75 yd (69 m)
EF0	Many trees branches were snapped, a few trees were uprooted, and a house sustained minor fascia damage. Barns and outbuildings were damaged as well, and pieces of sheet metal were thrown out into farm fields.						
EF1	NW of Oakley to S of Albany	Green	WI	42.5376°N 89.4888°W	00:20–00:29	10.17 mi (16.37 km)	50 yd (46 m)
EF1	Many outbuildings were damaged and some were destroyed, with roofing material blown upwards of 300 yd (270 m) away. A hay cart was rolled about 50 yd (46 m), a grain bin was destroyed, fencing was blown over, and four power poles were snapped. A couple of homes had minor damage, and many trees were also snapped or uprooted.						
EF1	Davis Junction to Belvidere to E of Russellville	Ogle, Winnebago, Boone	IL	42.0723°N 89.1497°W	00:24–00:50	27.51 mi (44.27 km)	600 yd (550 m)
EF1	1 death – This weak but long-tracked tornado developed southeast of Stillman Valley and moved northeastward through Davis Junction, where multiple homes had their roofs damaged, trees were damaged, fencing was downed, and a small building was destroyed at a park. The tornado then tracked to the northeast and moved through the centre of Belvidere and struck the historic Apollo Theatre, which had a large portion of its roof lifted and thrown across the street. Additionally, another part of the theatre's roof collapsed into the interior of the venue, which was hosting a sold-out concert with 260 people for Morbid Angel, Revocation, and Skeletal Remains at the time. At least 40 people were injured, and one person was killed, prompting a mass casualty incident declaration. Other buildings in the downtown area had parts of their brick exteriors damaged, and some outbuilding structures were damaged or destroyed. Trees and light poles were downed, and some homes in town had roofing, siding, and gutters torn off as well. The tornado then exited the city and moved through rural areas, causing additional minor tree damage before dissipating.						
EF0	NW of Brodhead to E of Albany	Green, Rock	WI	42.6368°N 89.4121°W	00:26–00:33	5.75 mi (9.25 km)	75 yd (69 m)
EF0	Multiple trees and outbuildings were damaged, and a house sustained fascia damage.						
EF2	NE of Tunica to NW of Nesbit	Tunica, DeSoto	MS	34.7066°N 90.3381°W	00:31–01:02	22.73 mi (36.58 km)	1,200 yd (1,100 m)
EF2	This tornado formed near Tunica and moved to the northeast, damaging or destroying many sheds and outbuildings, and tearing roofing and siding from numerous houses and mobile homes. A car was flipped, and a carport roof was torn off. A small area of high-end EF2 damage occurred west of Hernando, where a house sustained loss of its roof and had multiple exterior walls knocked down before the tornado moved to the northeast and dissipated. Many large hardwood trees and several power poles were snapped along the path.						
EF1	Rockford	Winnebago	IL	42.258°N 89.0796°W	00:31–00:38	5.79 mi (9.32 km)	300 yd (270 m)
EF1	A tornado began in Rockford and moved northeastward through residential areas of the city, downing numerous trees and tree limbs, including some uprooted trees that fell onto homes. Multiple homes also had minor roof damage, and a few power poles were snapped as well.						
EF1	Northern Rockford to Machesney Park to Roscoe	Winnebago	IL	42.3239°N 89.1053°W	00:33–00:42	8.63 mi (13.89 km)	300 yd (270 m)
EF1	This tornado touched down at the north edge of Rockford, causing minor tree, power pole, and outbuilding damage. It then moved northeastward along the Rock River and passed through Machesney Park, where many homes suffered roof damage, including several homes that had large sections of their roofs removed. Many trees were snapped or uprooted in town, and a couple of garden sheds were destroyed. The tornado downed a few more trees in Roscoe before it dissipated.						
EF1	SSW of Dewey to SSE of Ludlow	Champaign	IL	40.2804°N 88.2907°W	00:39–00:48	10.83 mi (17.43 km)	500 yd (460 m)
EF1	A high-end EF1 tornado demolished an agricultural cooperative due west of Rantoul and just south of Dewey, causing an anhydrous ammonia leak. Passing north of Rantoul, it snapped more than a mile of power lines and blew cars off the roadway along I-57 near Ludlow, flipping a tanker truck as well as a tour bus carrying 32 people, two of which were injured. As a result, I-57 was closed from Rantoul north to Paxton and US 136 was closed for approximately a mile west of Rantoul. Multiple outbuilding structures were completely destroyed along the path as well.						
EF1	Southeastern Caledonia, IL to Sharon to Delavan Lake, WI	Boone (IL), Walworth (WI)	IL, WI	42.3489°N 88.9027°W	00:44–01:01	17.32 mi (27.87 km)	300 yd (270 m)
EF1	This tornado touched down southwest of Caledonia and tracked northeast through mostly farmland, destroying numerous outbuildings, heavily damaging a silo, and collapsing a grain bin. As it moved into the Candlewick Lake neighborhood, several homes sustained roof and siding damage, and multiple trees were damaged. The tornado then crossed Wisconsin, where it continued for several more miles, primarily damaging barns and trees. It eventually weakened and lifted after causing additional rural structural and tree damage.						
EF0	Beloit	Rock	WI	42.5141°N 89.0258°W	00:48–00:54	3.56 mi (5.73 km)	100 yd (91 m)
EF0	Numerous trees were uprooted in Beloit as a result of this weak tornado.						
EF1	Hanerville to SSW of Utica	Dane	WI	42.8744°N 89.1682°W	00:49–00:59	4.75 mi (7.64 km)	75 yd (69 m)
EF1	Two power poles were snapped, a few outbuildings were damaged or destroyed, sheet metal was tossed 400 yd (370 m), and trees were snapped or uprooted.						
EF0	Montgomery to Southern Aurora	Kendall, Kane	IL	41.7124°N 88.3913°W	00:55–01:01	5.6 mi (9.0 km)	200 yd (180 m)
EF0	A weak tornado moved through Montgomery and Aurora, downing multiple trees and tree limbs, a few of which landed on houses. Fencing was blown over, a few homes had roof shingles removed, and one house had one of its windows broken.						
EF1	SSW of Rankin to NNW of Wellington	Vermilion, Iroquois	IL	40.405°N 87.9245°W	00:57–01:15	16.53 mi (26.60 km)	300 yd (270 m)
EF1	Trees were uprooted, while sheds and outbuildings at multiple farmsteads were damaged or destroyed, with their debris scattered into fields. Semi-trailers and pieces of farming equipment were damaged or destroyed as well, and a house sustained roof damage.						
EF0	ESE of Sharon to Eastern Delavan	Walworth	WI	42.4942°N 88.6972°W	01:00–01:09	10.62 mi (17.09 km)	100 yd (91 m)
EF0	Roofing panels were ripped from some farm outbuildings and large trees were toppled.						
EF0	Batavia	Kane	IL	41.8414°N 88.3321°W	01:00–01:02	1.6 mi (2.6 km)	225 yd (206 m)
EF0	A high-end EF0 tornado touched down in Batavia, where it uprooted trees, downed fences and power lines, peeled roof shingles off of homes, and toppled a chimney at a business. A church sign was damaged, and a building had siding torn off as well.						
EF0	Northern St. Charles	Kane	IL	41.9149°N 88.3339°W	01:01–01:03	1.66 mi (2.67 km)	150 yd (140 m)
EF0	Several trees were uprooted, power lines were downed, and roof shingles were peeled off of homes on the north side of St. Charles. A HVAC unit on the roof of a construction facility was also damaged.						
EF0	Southern Plainfield	Kendall, Will	IL	41.5395°N 88.2935°W	01:03–01:08	4.72 mi (7.60 km)	250 yd (230 m)
EF0	A high-end EF0 tornado damaged trees and blew roof shingles and siding off of several homes, including one house that had its chimney collapse. A trampoline was lofted into a tree as well.						
EF0	SE of Walworth to S of Lake Geneva	Walworth	WI	42.4965°N 88.5681°W	01:05–01:09	7 mi (11 km)	50 yd (46 m)
EF0	A barn and a shed were damaged, while sixteen power lines were snapped.						
EF0	Northern Plainfield	Will	IL	41.6366°N 88.2351°W	01:05–01:07	1.58 mi (2.54 km)	125 yd (114 m)
EF0	A brief tornado removed roof shingles and siding from homes, damaged multiple trees and fencing, and tossed trash dumpsters 150 yd (140 m).						
EF0	Lake Ripley	Jefferson	WI	42.995°N 89.0033°W	01:07–01:10	1.45 mi (2.33 km)	75 yd (69 m)
EF0	Multiple houses sustained damage to their roof shingles, siding, and fascia. A small shed was destroyed, a fence was damaged, and trees were snapped or uprooted.						
EF0	E of Richmond	Walworth	WI	42.6814°N 88.7495°W	01:08–01:15	5.39 mi (8.67 km)	50 yd (46 m)
EF0	A house sustained minor fascia damage, and many trees were snapped or uprooted. Metal roofing was torn off a farm building as well.						
EF0	WNW of Como to Eastern Elkhorn	Walworth	WI	42.6049°N 88.5176°W	01:10–01:17	6.04 mi (9.72 km)	150 yd (140 m)
EF0	This tornado touched down at the Geneva National Golf Club and moved north through the east side of Elkhorn. A storage facility had a significant amount of its roofing blown off, and trees were uprooted.						
EF1	Southern Salem	Marion	IL	38.6021°N 88.998°W	01:11–01:18	5.95 mi (9.58 km)	250 yd (230 m)
EF1	This tornado moved through the south side of Salem, where multiple homes had parts of their roofs torn off and one house was shifted off its foundation. Some commercial buildings in town had sections of their roofs and exterior walls torn off, an apartment building had siding removed, and some outbuildings were destroyed. A garage and a few more outbuildings were destroyed outside of town, and numerous trees were damaged or downed along the path as well.						
EF1	Northern Lombard to Addison	DuPage	IL	41.9072°N 88.0178°W	01:17–01:19	1.57 mi (2.53 km)	175 yd (160 m)
EF1	This tornado, which was embedded within the northern part of a much larger area of damaging straight-line winds, damaged several warehouses and office buildings as it moved from the northern part of Lombard into Addison. One brick warehouse had its roof and garage door damaged and had one of its exterior walls blown out. Trees and tree limbs were downed, a few of which landed on homes. Some power poles were leaned over as well.						
EF1	S of Stockland	Iroquois	IL	40.572°N 87.6122°W	01:20–01:24	4.84 mi (7.79 km)	300 yd (270 m)
EF1	A small outbuilding was destroyed, and trees and power poles were damaged.						
EF1	SE of Palmyra	Jefferson, Waukesha	WI	42.8588°N 88.5748°W	01:26–01:30	2.79 mi (4.49 km)	50 yd (46 m)
EF1	A tornado heavily damaged a house that was under construction and lofted debris for several hundred yards, some of which was embedded into the ground. Multiple trees were snapped as well.						
EF1	S of Mount Pleasant to S of Early Grove	Marshall	MS	34.9168°N 89.5176°W	01:27–01:37	8.11 mi (13.05 km)	100 yd (91 m)
EF1	Many trees were snapped and uprooted, including one tree that fell on and damaged the roof of a house.						
EF2	WNW of Oxford to NW of Badger Grove	Benton, White	IN	40.533°N 87.283°W	01:33–01:47	15.16 mi (24.40 km)	500 yd (460 m)
EF2	Two homes sustained significant damage, one of which had a section of its second story destroyed. Some other homes were damaged to a lesser degree, including one that had part of a silo thrown into it. Many trees and power poles were downed, and farm outbuildings were damaged or destroyed as well.						
EF2	S of Fowler to S of Remington	Benton	IN	40.578°N 87.3237°W	01:33–01:42	11.53 mi (18.56 km)	400 yd (370 m)
EF2	A strong tornado struck a wind farm, damaging several wind turbines, including one that was snapped and toppled to the ground. A blade from one of the turbines was found 600 yd (550 m) away from where it originated. Trees and power poles were downed, a house had part of its roof torn off, and grain bins were blown over. Sheds, barns, and outbuildings were also destroyed with debris strewn across fields.						
EF1	N of Wadena to ENE of Remington	Benton, Jasper	IN	40.7125°N 87.2775°W	01:41–01:50	10.22 mi (16.45 km)	500 yd (460 m)
EF1	Trees were downed, power poles were snapped, and several farm outbuildings were damaged or destroyed.						
EF1	Merrillville	Lake	IN	41.4779°N 87.3562°W	01:53–01:56	3.22 mi (5.18 km)	325 yd (297 m)
EF1	This tornado moved through Merrillville, where a few residences had their attached garages heavily damaged or destroyed. Multiple other homes sustained considerable roof damage and had windows blown out. Several trees and power lines were damaged as well.						
EF0	WSW of Smithson	White	IN	40.7151°N 86.8893°W	01:55–01:58	1.29 mi (2.08 km)	125 yd (114 m)
EF0	A short-lived tornado damaged a pole barn and tossed two empty silos. A wind turbine had one of its blades torn off.						
EF2	NW of Saulsbury to WSW of Hornsby	Hardeman	TN	35.0767°N 89.1092°W	01:55–02:09	12.78 mi (20.57 km)	450 yd (410 m)
EF2	This low-end EF2 tornado snapped or uprooted hundreds of large trees as it moved through wooded areas. A house had significant roof damage, and a few other residences sustained more minor damage.						
EF3	SW of Ste. Marie, IL to Southern Robinson, IL to Sullivan, IN	Jasper (IL), Crawford (IL), Sullivan (IN)	IL, IN	38.9018°N 88.0604°W	01:58–02:33	40.89 mi (65.81 km)	700 yd (640 m)
EF3	6 deaths – See article on this tornado – At least nine people were injured.						
EF0	SE of Hobart	Porter	IN	41.4853°N 87.1956°W	02:01–02:02	0.62 mi (1.00 km)	125 yd (114 m)
EF0	A brief, weak tornado caused damage to trees, outbuildings, and farm equipment.						
EF1	NNW of Lake Cicott to SW of Royal Center	Cass	IN	40.815°N 86.5572°W	02:13–02:16	1.73 mi (2.78 km)	300 yd (270 m)
EF1	A brief tornado damaged or destroyed multiple barns and power poles. A house was unroofed, the back garage portion of another home was damaged, and a fuel tank was rolled into a field.						
EF2	Southern Bethel Springs to Northern Adamsville to SSW of Lebanon	McNairy, Hardin	TN	35.2128°N 88.6067°W	02:30–02:51	18.91 mi (30.43 km)	800 yd (730 m)
EF2	A low-end EF2 tornado began on the south side of Bethel Springs, causing minor damage there before moving to the northeast and intensifying. A double-wide mobile home was destroyed, a church sustained significant roof damage and the collapse of an exterior wall, and several homes sustained extensive damage and had large portions of their roofs torn off. Many trees were downed, wooden power poles were snapped, and metal electrical transmission poles were bent to the ground. A fifth-wheel camper was rolled, and a few outbuildings were damaged or destroyed. Less than two hours later, a stronger and more destructive EF3 tornado moved through southern Bethel Springs, impacting the same area where this tornado touched down.						
EF0	SE of Bowers to S of Colfax	Montgomery, Boone	IN	40.1378°N 86.6963°W	02:43–02:45	1.77 mi (2.85 km)	50 yd (46 m)
EF0	This high-end EF0 tornado partially destroyed a barn with debris from the structure thrown up to 0.25 mi (0.40 km) away. Another older barn was shifted off its foundation and trees were damaged as well.						
EF2	E of Bowers to E of Manson	Montgomery, Boone, Clinton	IN	40.154°N 86.7171°W	02:43–02:53	10.55 mi (16.98 km)	100 yd (91 m)
EF2	Several farmsteads were damaged near Colfax, including one where a house was severely damaged. Two other homes sustained roof loss and some power poles were snapped. Many trees were snapped or uprooted, a few barns and silos were destroyed, and sheet metal debris was wrapped around trees. A large radio tower was toppled to the ground as well.						
EF3	ENE of Spencer to NNE of Mount Tabor	Owen, Monroe	IN	39.2978°N 86.7282°W	03:01–03:09	5.92 mi (9.53 km)	400 yd (370 m)
EF3	2 deaths – A strong tornado touched down in McCormick's Creek State Park and moved east-northeastward, snapping many hardwood trees and destroying numerous camper trailers, killing two people. The tornado reached its peak intensity of EF3 after exiting the park, severely damaging or destroying several frame homes. Some houses had total roof and exterior wall loss, a block foundation home was completely leveled, and multiple mobile homes and farm buildings were obliterated. Cars were tossed and mangled and pieces of farm machinery were thrown, including a 12-ton combine and a tractor that were lofted through the air. A few metal truss electrical transmission towers were blown over, and many large trees were snapped, stripped of their branches, and partially debarked. Some additional less intense roof and tree damage farther along the path before the tornado dissipated. In addition to the fatalities, two people were injured.						
EF0	NE of McLemoresville	Carroll	TN	36.0098°N 88.5391°W	03:10–03:11	1.33 mi (2.14 km)	50 yd (46 m)
EF0	Two houses had minor roof damage, and a small metal outbuilding had its roof panels torn off. Large tree branches were downed as well.						
EF0	S of Russiaville	Howard	IN	40.3967°N 86.2742°W	03:11–03:12	0.86 mi (1.38 km)	80 yd (73 m)
EF0	A brief tornado damaged a house, a barn, and some trees.						
EF2	Southern Martinsville to NW of Morgantown	Morgan	IN	39.3865°N 86.4618°W	03:12–03:22	8.6 mi (13.8 km)	200 yd (180 m)
EF2	A strong tornado impacted the southern edge of Martinsville immediately after touching down, partially to completely unroofing several homes in a subdivision near I-69, while other homes had shingles and siding torn off. A grain bin, a silo, and an outbuilding were also destroyed along the initial part of the path, and several trees were snapped. Near the end of its damage path, the tornado destroyed the second story of a house and damaged the roofs of several other homes. A pontoon boat was lofted from a small lake in this area and tossed roughly 440 yd (400 m) into a home, and a race car trailer was thrown 200 yd (180 m). Trees were snapped or damaged along the path as well.						
EF0	ENE of Russiaville	Howard	IN	40.4254°N 86.1946°W	03:15–03:17	0.14 mi (0.23 km)	10 yd (9.1 m)
EF0	A couple of homes sustained roof damage, one of which sustained extensive damage to its attached garage. A car was turned, a playground set was tossed, and pieces of wood were driven into siding or trees. Trees were damaged and a few small sheds were destroyed.						
EF1	E of Hemlock to E of Greentown	Howard	IN	40.419°N 86.0237°W	03:20–03:27	6.41 mi (10.32 km)	25 yd (23 m)
EF1	A high-end EF1 tornado destroyed a small barn and an adjacent manufactured home immediately after touching down, causing one serious injury. A car was flipped nearby, while a farmhouse and a larger barn had less severe damage. The tornado then continued to the northeast, damaging or destroying several other barns and outbuildings, snapping trees, and damaging homes, including one that sustained roof loss. Additional tree and roof damage occurred in a subdivision near Greentown before the tornado dissipated.						
EF0	S of Bargersville	Johnson	IN	39.4955°N 86.1738°W	03:27–03:31	1.93 mi (3.11 km)	25 yd (23 m)
EF0	Trees and power lines were damaged, and the metal roofing of a barn was peeled back.						
EF0	NE of Bruceton	Benton	TN	36.0984°N 88.1905°W	03:29–03:30	0.62 mi (1.00 km)	50 yd (46 m)
EF0	A brief, high-end EF0 tornado struck a metal outbuilding, ripping off most of its roof and collapsing its walls. Metal debris from the structure was lofted into trees, and a couple of tree branches were downed.						
EF2	Swayzee	Grant	IN	40.5062°N 85.8434°W	03:33–03:38	3.09 mi (4.97 km)	150 yd (140 m)
EF2	This strong tornado moved through downtown Swayzee, where a few brick businesses sustained collapse of their upper floor exterior walls, while other businesses and a church sustained roof damage. Numerous houses sustained considerable roof and exterior damage in residential areas, including one home that was shifted off its foundation. Swayzee Elementary School also had roof damage and mobile homes were pushed off their blocks, one of which was crushed and destroyed by a large tree. Multiple storage sheds were also destroyed, a car was moved, and a large metal silo at a grain facility in town was badly damaged as well. The tornado also impacted a couple of farmsteads just outside of town, where some barns and garages were damaged or destroyed and a house had minor roof damage. Numerous large trees and power poles were snapped along the path.						
EF3	Whiteland	Johnson	IN	39.5363°N 86.1042°W	03:33–03:41	5.48 mi (8.82 km)	316 yd (289 m)
EF3	This intense tornado moved directly through Whiteland, causing major damage to numerous homes, some of which were unroofed and had multiple exterior walls knocked down. A few homes were shifted off their foundations, one was left with a single wall standing, and a poorly anchored house was swept away with only its foundation remaining. Garages were destroyed while a cell tower, a library, and the Whiteland Fire Department were also damaged, and many trees were snapped or uprooted in town. The tornado reached its peak intensity just east of the town, where a large warehouse building that housed NFI Industries was largely destroyed. Debris from the building was strewn across I-65, and multiple nearby semi-trailers were tossed and destroyed. The tornado abruptly weakened and dissipated after crossing the interstate.						
EF2	Northeastern Fort Wayne to E of Cuba	Allen	IN	41.109°N 85.0286°W	03:36–03:43	7.86 mi (12.65 km)	400 yd (370 m)
EF2	A strong tornado touched down in the northeastern part of Fort Wayne, where many homes had roofing and siding torn off and numerous trees were snapped or uprooted, a few of which landed on houses. Fences and power lines were also downed, and a carpeting business was partially destroyed. A church had a portion of its roof removed, and some self-storage buildings sustained minor damage. The tornado reached its peak strength as it exited Fort Wayne and continued to the northeast, unroofing a few homes and a construction supply company. Barns, garages, and livestock buildings were completely destroyed with their debris strewn across fields. Significant tree damage occurred in rural areas as well, and many power poles were snapped to the south of Harlan before the tornado dissipated.						
EF3	Southeastern Gas City to N of Upland	Grant	IN	40.4811°N 85.5929°W	03:42–03:47	6.35 mi (10.22 km)	200 yd (180 m)
EF3	This intense tornado first touched down at the southeast edge of Gas City, initially causing minimal damage to a Walmart distribution center, trees, and power lines. Continuing to the northeast of town, the tornado reached its peak intensity as several houses were significantly damaged, some had roofs and exterior walls removed, and two poorly anchored homes collapsed. Multiple cars and RV trailers were tossed and rolled, while many large trees were snapped and twisted. Power poles were also snapped, while barns, sheds, and garages were destroyed. The tornado damaged a few more homes towards the end of its path, one of which had its roof removed. The top of a silo was blown off, and some additional garages and outbuildings were destroyed before the tornado dissipated.						
EF0	E of Harlan	Allen	IN	41.1961°N 84.9000°W	03:44–03:45	1.14 mi (1.83 km)	75 yd (69 m)
EF0	A brief tornado was confirmed, forming within a microburst shortly after the Fort Wayne EF2 tornado dissipated. Minor damage to homes and a barn was noted, with debris being thrown into nearby fields. Some tree damage occurred as well.						
EF0	NE of Antwerp	Paulding	OH	41.2016°N 84.6876°W	03:53–03:55	0.82 mi (1.32 km)	150 yd (140 m)
EF0	A brief tornado caused minor roof and siding damage to a few homes, and downed several trees.						
EF3	S of Hornsby to Southern Bethel Springs to Northern Adamsville to SE of Gordonsburg	Hardeman, McNairy, Hardin, Wayne, Lewis	TN	35.1559°N 88.8175°W	04:04–05:37	86.01 mi (138.42 km)	1,400 yd (1,300 m)
EF3	9 deaths – See article on this tornado – 23 people were injured.						
EF0	N of Salamonia	Jay	IN	40.3931°N 84.8827°W	04:19–04:22	1.54 mi (2.48 km)	175 yd (160 m)
EF0	Multiple empty grain bins were pushed over, blown off their foundations, or damaged by flying debris. Three newer barns were also damaged.						
EF0	NE of Portland to SW of Westchester	Jay	IN	40.4677°N 84.9436°W	04:20–04:23	2.44 mi (3.93 km)	100 yd (91 m)
EF0	Two barns sustained roof and wall damage, and sheet metal debris was lofted into trees. Power poles and trees were snapped as well.						
EF1	Eastern Louisville	Jefferson, Shelby	KY	38.2696°N 85.4967°W	04:30–04:34	3.98 mi (6.41 km)	130 yd (120 m)
EF1	A low-end EF1 tornado touched down in the eastern outskirts of Louisville, northeast of Middletown. It first struck a warehouse, peeling back a small part of the building and removing insulation. Elsewhere, a plastic surgery center sustained considerable roof damage, while some apartments and office buildings had minimal damage. A few street signs and light poles were bent over, and homes had minor shingle and gutter damage. Fencing was blown over, and dozens of trees were snapped or uprooted. The tornado crossed into Shelby County, causing sporadic tree damage at the Persimmon Ridge Golf Club before dissipating.						
EF0	NNW of St. Marys to WSW of Kossuth	Auglaize	OH	40.5952°N 84.4442°W	04:45–04:49	4.53 mi (7.29 km)	250 yd (230 m)
EF0	Shingles were ripped off a house and tree damage occurred. A grain bin, multiple hog barns, and outbuildings were destroyed.						
EF0	N of Osgood to Minster	Mercer, Auglaize	OH	40.3652°N 84.5002°W	04:45–04:53	8.36 mi (13.45 km)	200 yd (180 m)
EF0	This tornado touched down and moved to the northeast, damaging or destroying several barns and inflicting minor damage to a house. The tornado caused some minor damage to trees and structures in the northern part of Minster before it dissipated.						
EF0	ENE of New Paris to W of Hamburg	Preble	OH	39.8617°N 84.7751°W	04:47–04:49	2.61 mi (4.20 km)	150 yd (140 m)
EF0	A high-end EF0 tornado damaged several barns, including some barns that multiple walls knocked down. A home sustained minor damage and some trees were uprooted.						
EF1	Southeastern Wapakoneta to NNE of Waynesfield	Auglaize	OH	40.5345°N 84.2253°W	04:54–05:07	17.17 mi (27.63 km)	300 yd (270 m)
EF1	This tornado first touched down to the southwest of Wapakoneta, initially downing a few trees and destroying a barn. It then reached high-end EF1 intensity as it struck the southeast edge of town, where a large commercial greenhouse was leveled and a couple of industrial buildings were heavily damaged, one of which sustained collapse of an exterior wall. A truck stop was also significantly damaged and several semi-trailers were overturned at that location, while multiple RVs were tossed around at a nearby campground, injuring seven people. A large meeting hall building at the campground had its roof removed, and trees were downed. Light posts were also knocked over, and several power poles were snapped in this area as well. The tornado continued into rural areas outside of Wapakoneta and passed near Uniopolis before it dissipated farther to the northeast, destroying a couple of barns and an old historic brick schoolhouse. Several homes were also damaged, one of which had a large part of its roof torn off.						

=== April 1 event ===
List of confirmed tornadoes – Saturday, April 1, 2023
EF#	Location	County / parish	State	Start coord.	Time (UTC)	Path length	Max. width
EF0	N of Laura to Northern Troy	Miami	OH	40.0241°N 84.4078°W	05:01–05:14	12.78 mi (20.57 km)	250 yd (230 m)
EF0	This tornado first significantly damaged a couple of barns and garages, while some tree damage occurred as well. The tornado moved through the north side of Troy before it dissipated, damaging the roofs of several homes and causing tree damage. A building at the Miami County Fairgrounds had part of its metal roof peeled back as well.						
EF0	N of Pleasant Hill	Miami	OH	40.0704°N 84.3905°W	05:02–05:06	4 mi (6.4 km)	250 yd (230 m)
EF0	A weak tornado damaged a few barns and downed some trees.						
EF0	WNW of Lafayette	Allen	OH	40.7593°N 83.9851°W	05:02–05:06	0.78 mi (1.26 km)	75 yd (69 m)
EF0	Two barns were destroyed and several trees were downed.						
EF0	SW of Potsdam to Western West Milton	Darke, Miami	OH	39.9486°N 84.4491°W	05:02–05:08	5.92 mi (9.53 km)	200 yd (180 m)
EF0	Damage to trees and some barns occurred. The tornado entered West Milton at the end of its path, causing some minor tree damage in the western part of town before dissipating.						
EF0	E of South Warsaw to SSW of Westminster	Allen	OH	40.6594°N 84.0036°W	05:03–05:04	0.62 mi (1.00 km)	50 yd (46 m)
EF0	A house sustained minor damage and several trees were snapped or uprooted. A grain bin was destroyed and tossed about 0.5 mi (0.80 km) as well.						
EF0	SSW of Westminster	Allen	OH	40.6579°N 83.9895°W	05:04–05:05	0.23 mi (0.37 km)	50 yd (46 m)
EF0	A barn was heavily damaged and its debris was thrown into nearby fields.						
EF2	NNE of Ellistown to SE of Baldwyn	Union, Lee	MS	34.463°N 88.8316°W	05:46–05:59	14.72 mi (23.69 km)	750 yd (690 m)
EF2	This strong tornado moved through areas between Guntown and Baldwyn. Several houses had their roofs and exterior walls removed, other homes sustained more minor damage, and a large two-story garage was swept away. Mobile homes and campers were also destroyed, with one mobile home being swept away as well. Two churches, a shop building, and a large sign were damaged, and many trees were snapped or uprooted along the path.						
EF2	NNW of Randolph to E of Pontotoc	Pontotoc	MS	34.189°N 89.223°W	05:52–06:21	22.84 mi (36.76 km)	475 yd (434 m)
EF2	1 death – This tornado developed north-northwest of Randolph and moved eastward, damaging several homes and outbuildings and downing trees, one of which fell on and damaged the front side of a home. Roof damage to homes continued as the tornado approached Pontotoc, with one home having part of its roof removed. The tornado reached its peak intensity as it struck the southern outskirts of Pontotoc, where a double-wide mobile home was obliterated and swept away, several homes had large portions of their roofs removed, and a large anchored garage was leveled. Other homes and a butcher shop in the area had less severe roof damage, and many trees were snapped. Moving eastward, the tornado continued to snap or uproot trees, and inflicted varying degrees of roof damage to multiple homes. One home lost part of its roof and had its attached garage destroyed, and an adjacent unanchored double-wide mobile home was swept away and destroyed, killing the occupant. Continuing eastward, the tornado inflicted roof damage to more homes, rolled and destroyed a small barber shop building, and snapped or uprooted numerous trees. Some of the trees landed on homes, causing structural damage. A church sign and cemetery sign were blown down, and several headstones in the cemetery were damaged before the tornado dissipated. In all, roughly 75 to 100 structures were impacted by the tornado.						
EF1	E of Hartsville to SE of Lafayette	Trousdale, Macon	TN	36.4204°N 86.0464°W	05:53–05:58	6.2 mi (10.0 km)	125 yd (114 m)
EF1	Several outbuildings were damaged or destroyed, while homes suffered siding and roof damage, including some that had portions of their roofs removed. Trees were snapped or uprooted, and one home was also damaged by a falling tree limb. A propane tank was flipped, causing a family at that residence to temporarily evacuate.						
EF0	WSW of Lykens	Crawford	OH	40.9597°N 83.0709°W	05:47–05:50	2.85 mi (4.59 km)	200 yd (180 m)
EF0	A high-end EF0 tornado damaged the roof of a barn and damaged and moved a large dairy barn. A silo was blown onto the Wheeling and Lake Erie Railway line, causing a westward-moving train to collide into it. A two-car garage was damaged, a concrete block was blown up into a tree, and several 2x4s were impaled into the ground and the roof of a home.						
EF1	WNW of Chapel Hill to E of Eagleville	Marshall, Bedford, Rutherford	TN	35.6642°N 86.753°W	06:16–06:31	12.93 mi (20.81 km)	150 yd (140 m)
EF1	This high-end EF1 tornado downed many trees and caused various degrees of roof, window, and siding damage to multiple homes. One older house had a second story exterior wall blown out, and another home had a large portion of its roof torn off. Along US 31A/SR 11 in Holts Corner, five train cars on the CSX S&NA North Subdivision were derailed. A couple of outbuildings were damaged as well.						
EF1	Southern Tupelo	Lee	MS	34.2327°N 88.7226°W	06:28–06:31	2.11 mi (3.40 km)	375 yd (343 m)
EF1	This high-end EF1 tornado caused considerable damage as it moved through the south side of Tupelo. Several homes sustained roof damage, vehicles were damaged, a fence was blown over, and trees were downed. A warehouse building was mostly collapsed, and nearby-semi trailers were moved, one of which was flipped. Large industrial buildings at the Cooper Tire & Rubber Company plant sustained significant roof loss, and debris from the facility was scattered over several miles to the east. A small outbuilding structure was destroyed, and a business had its windows blown out.						
EF0	Golden	Tishomingo	MS	34.4851°N 88.1953°W	06:30–06:32	1.39 mi (2.24 km)	80 yd (73 m)
EF0	A brief high-end EF0 tornado moved through Golden, initially causing minor damage with small tree limbs broken and a power line brought down. The most significant damage occurred shortly afterward, where a towing service building was knocked down, a shed was flipped, and the framing of a house under construction collapsed. Farther along the path, another shed was destroyed and additional power lines were downed. Numerous trees were uprooted across the affected area, with tree damage continuing until the tornado dissipated near the banks of Bear Creek.						
EF2	S of Murfreesboro to Readyville to N of Woodbury	Rutherford, Cannon	TN	35.7554°N 86.3814°W	06:41–06:59	18.45 mi (29.69 km)	500 yd (460 m)
EF2	Several homes near Murfreesboro sustained mostly minor damage, though one house sustained roof loss and a very old abandoned house was destroyed. A billboard and multiple trees were blown down, and a few outbuildings were damaged. The tornado then intensified and struck Readyville at high-end EF2 strength, causing major damage. The Readyville Mill, post office, a market, and a few other businesses were destroyed, and the historic Charles Ready House was heavily damaged and had its entire roof torn off. Many homes in town were severely damaged or destroyed, including a couple of poorly anchored homes that were pushed off their foundations, one of which collapsed. Other homes had their roofs and exterior walls torn off, while an outdoor wedding venue, barns, and detached garages were completely destroyed. Cars were overturned, and many large trees were snapped or uprooted in town. The tornado weakened as it moved away from Readyville, blowing down numerous trees and inflicting minor damage to homes before dissipating. Two people were injured.						
EF1	SSW of Hackleburg to Southern Bear Creek to NE of Haleyville	Marion, Winston	AL	34.238°N 87.851°W	07:32–07:52	16.98 mi (27.33 km)	675 yd (617 m)
EF1	A high-end EF1 tornado first touched down near Hackleburg before striking the rural community of Fairview and surrounding areas, snapping or uprooting many trees. A mobile home was destroyed, while frame homes and outbuildings sustained minor damage. As the tornado moved through the southern outskirts of Bear Creek, a furniture factory housed in a large metal warehouse building was heavily damaged. Significant tree damage occurred, an outbuilding structure was destroyed, and a mobile home was flipped upside-down, severely injuring the occupant. The tornado continued through rural areas to the east of Bear Creek before dissipating, where multiple homes were damaged by falling trees or the tornado itself, and a detached garage was destroyed.						
EF3	N of Hazel Green, AL to SSW of Elora, TN	Madison (AL), Lincoln (TN)	AL, TN	34.9746°N 86.5738°W	08:09–08:25	12.03 mi (19.36 km)	215 yd (197 m)
EF3	1 death – This intense tornado touched down in the Fisk community and quickly strengthened to mid-range EF3 intensity. A few businesses had their roofs removed and exterior walls knocked down, and a box truck was thrown against a utility pole. A couple of homes sustained less severe damage and trees were downed as well. Continuing east-northeastward, the tornado badly damaged a house, inflicted roof and window damage to other homes, destroyed outbuildings, and snapped or uprooted many trees. It then reached its peak intensity of high-end EF3 as it moved along the Alabama-Tennessee state line. Multiple homes were heavily damaged or destroyed, including a few that were completely leveled, with a fatality occurring in one of the homes. Other homes suffered roof damage, power poles were snapped, and a mobile home was obliterated and swept away. A large metal outbuilding and multiple barns were destroyed, and wooden fence posts anchored in concrete were pulled out of the ground. The tornado weakened after crossing into Tennessee, where several outbuildings housing farm equipment were destroyed, and trees were sporadically snapped and uprooted before the tornado dissipated south of Elora. Five people were injured.						
EF1	Sunbright	Morgan	TN	36.243°N 84.68°W	08:10–08:15	1.44 mi (2.32 km)	60 yd (55 m)
EF1	A tornado touched down west of Sunbright, downing numerous large trees and causing minor roof damage to nearby homes. It tracked northeast and crossed US 27, continuing to produce structural and tree damage. The tornado damaged Sunbright City Hall and then caused significant roof damage to two homes, with many trees snapped or uprooted nearby. Near the end of its path, more damage was observed where another house sustained substantial damage before the tornado lifted.						
EF0	Northern Sardis City	Etowah	AL	34.181°N 86.149°W	09:51–09:55	3.1 mi (5.0 km)	250 yd (230 m)
EF0	A shop had large doors blown out, a church had a portion of its roof ripped off, and several homes in town sustained significant roof damage as a result of this high-end EF0 tornado. One home in particular experienced failure of its west-facing garage door, causing the roof to be ripped off and walls to collapse. Sheds were damaged or destroyed, while fencing and a silo were damaged. Numerous trees were snapped or uprooted, some of which fell on and caused significant damage to site-built homes and manufactured homes. Two people in a manufactured home were injured.						
EF0	Northern Woodstock	Cherokee	GA	34.1245°N 84.5357°W	11:35–11:38	2.49 mi (4.01 km)	75 yd (69 m)
EF0	This tornado touched down along the northern edge of a residential area, snapping a few trees before moving east through wooded terrain where additional trees were broken. As it crossed I-575, a vehicle was reportedly spun, its hood blown back into the windshield, and multiple street signs and small trees were knocked down along the interstate. Continuing east, the tornado primarily caused tree damage before entering the South Cherokee Recreational complex, where it blew the roof off a dugout, overturned bleachers, and toppled a press box. The tornado then weakened and lifted shortly thereafter.						
EF0	Dundee	Monroe	MI	41.946°N 83.711°W	15:03–15:08	7.12 mi (11.46 km)	75 yd (69 m)
EF0	A weak tornado moved through downtown Dundee, where buildings had roofing material blown off with debris strewn across streets. Windows were broken, tree limbs were downed, and cars were also damaged. Homes sustained roof shingle damage, and an outbuilding was damaged outside of town as well.						
EF3	NW of Bridgeville to Ellendale	Sussex	DE	38.757°N 75.6398°W	21:59–22:19	14.3 mi (23.0 km)	700 yd (640 m)
EF3	1 death – This intense tornado touched down northwest of Bridgeville and moved east-northeast, crossing DE 404. Outbuildings at several farmsteads were damaged, a ham radio antennae was knocked over behind a house, power poles were snapped, and trees were downed, one of which landed on a house and caused roof damage. Semi-trailers were overturned, and an unanchored home was pushed off its foundation and collapsed with debris scattered for hundreds of yards. The tornado reached its maximum strength as it impacted a DelDOT facility, where two large steel high-tension power poles were bent to the ground, and at least six wooden high-tension poles were snapped. This damage garnered a low-end EF3 rating. A large metal garage structure at the facility sustained partial collapse of an exterior wall and lost much of its roof, a salt storage building had its roof destroyed, and some other buildings on the property were also damaged. The tornado then crossed US 13 and continued to the east-northeast, flattening two poorly anchored homes and causing a fatality. A few other homes had large portions of their roofs and exterior walls torn off, while numerous additional residences along this segment of the path were damaged to a lesser extent. Outbuildings, chicken houses, barns and garages were destroyed, pivot irrigation sprinklers were flipped, and many trees and power poles were snapped as well. The tornado then weakened as it crossed US 113 and entered Ellendale, where homes had their roofs damaged and one residence had its attached garage destroyed. A free-standing garage and an automotive repair business had roofing blown off, and tree damage occurred in town as well. The tornado weakened further as it exited Ellendale, causing some additional minor tree damage and overturning a pivot irrigation sprinkler before dissipating. This tornado was the largest ever recorded in Delaware and is tied as the strongest in state history, alongside an F3 tornado on April 28, 1961. Furthermore, it was the second fatal tornado in Delaware history, with the other occurring on July 21, 1983.						
EF1	Calvert to N of North East	Cecil	MD	39.7°N 76.01°W	22:35–23:41	5.49 mi (8.84 km)	125 yd (114 m)
EF1	This tornado first struck the Plumpton Park Zoo, where a metal door was damaged at a giraffe enclosure. Portable toilets at Calvert Regional Park were thrown more than 300 yards (270 m) and completely destroyed. A small barn was pushed about 50 yd (46 m) into a field and collapsed, fencing was damaged, and a sign was torn off the Cecil Arena. Multiple homes and businesses sustained minor structural damage, including to their fencing, shingles, fascia, soffits, and siding. Well over one hundred trees were snapped or uprooted along the path, and four wooden power poles were snapped as well.						
EF1	S of Wrightstown to Newtown	Bucks	PA	40.2486°N 74.9914°W	22:46–22:50	3.9 mi (6.3 km)	200 yd (180 m)
EF1	This QLCS tornado developed and initially uprooted and snapped several trees. As it progressed southeast, the tornado caused additional tree damage in residential areas and across the Bucks County Community College campus. The strongest damage was observed on the north side of Newtown, where part of a strip mall sustained failure of a roof façade, indicating the peak winds along the path. Farther east, tree damage continued through downtown Newtown before the continuous damage path ended near the Newtown Cemetery.						
EF1	Cinnaminson to Eastern Moorestown	Burlington	NJ	40.0065°N 75.0006°W	22:59–23:03	6 mi (9.7 km)	600 yd (550 m)
EF1	A tornado touched down in Cinnaminson, producing initial damage marked by snapped and uprooted trees before tracking east-southeast through residential areas. The damage path quickly widened, with numerous trees downed across neighborhoods near local schools. The strongest damage occurred where a single-family home lost most of its roof covering. The tornado then crossed US 130 and entered a cemetery, where a broad swath of softwood trees were uprooted or snapped at the trunks. Continuing east-southeast, the tornado moved through additional neighborhoods and parkland, maintaining a wide tree-damage swath. The damage path became difficult to trace through a wooded preserve, but minor tree and limb damage reappeared farther east. More concentrated tree damage was observed again as the tornado weakened, with trees leaning onto utility lines and minor siding and shingle damage to homes. The tornado finally dissipated after snapping the top of a utility pole, with damage becoming increasingly narrow and sporadic toward the end of its path.						
EF1	Crosswicks to SSW of Allentown	Burlington, Mercer, Monmouth	NJ	40.1525°N 74.6461°W	23:08–23:11	2.8 mi (4.5 km)	300 yd (270 m)
EF1	A tornado developed in the Crosswicks and produced damage that was largely confined to trees, with numerous trees uprooted or snapped within and just east of the village. As it moved east, fairly significant tree damage continued on residential properties before the tornado entered an inaccessible wooded area along a creek and crossed into Mercer County. The circulation later reemerged near a recreation facility, where additional trees were uprooted along a tree line. The tornado weakened and dissipated in an open field a few minutes later after crossing into Upper Freehold Township, with no further damage observed beyond that point.						
EF1	SSE of Allentown to Northern Cream Ridge	Monmouth	NJ	40.1541°N 74.5715°W	23:14–23:17	4 mi (6.4 km)	550 yd (500 m)
EF1	This high-end EF1 tornado developed west of a residential neighborhood and quickly caused its most significant damage as it entered the community. Numerous trees were snapped or uprooted, and several homes sustained roof shingle loss, siding damage, blown-out windows, and a few failed garage doors. An irrigation pivot was overturned and blown into fencing and nearby yards, and another pivot was later toppled as the tornado moved east across open farmland. Continuing eastward, the tornado caused additional tree damage, including snapped trunks and uprooted trees, and left a wooden power pole leaning in the direction of motion. Road signs were blown down at a nearby traffic circle, and damage remained mainly tree-related as the tornado crossed more fields. The tornado then entered another wooded residential area where the circulation widened again, snapping and uprooting numerous trees, including one that fell onto power lines. After producing additional tree damage near another neighborhood, the tornado weakened and dissipated in an open field.						
EF2	SE of Holmeson to W of Jackson Mills	Ocean	NJ	40.1555°N 74.3937°W	23:24–23:27	2.1 mi (3.4 km)	200 yd (180 m)
EF2	A significant, high-end EF2 tornado touched down in Jackson Township and moved east, snapping and uprooting dozens of large hardwood and softwood trees in a convergent pattern. Along this portion of the track, power poles were downed, fences were demolished, and sheds, small outbuildings, and dumpsters were flipped or displaced, while homes generally sustained only minor siding and shingle damage. The tornado then intensified as it crossed a cleared area and struck a large warehouse complex, where multiple three-story concrete tilt-up walls collapsed eastward and extensive debris was generated. Numerous trees around the warehouse and adjacent parking areas were snapped or uprooted, lying predominantly east to northeast. Continuing east-southeast, the tornado produced its most extensive tree and powerline damage, with hundreds of mature trees downed and additional power poles snapped, along with roofing and insulation debris scattered from the warehouse. As it entered a residential area farther east, the tornado weakened, the damage path narrowed, and impacts were limited to scattered tree damage and minor roof and siding damage before the tornado dissipated.						
EF2	Jackson Township to Howell Township	Ocean, Monmouth	NJ	40.1543°N 74.2735°W	23:33–23:34	1.59 mi (2.56 km)	150 yd (140 m)
EF2	This strong tornado touched down within a wooded residential area, immediately producing a swath of snapped and uprooted hardwood and softwood trees in a convergent pattern. Numerous fences were demolished, sheds were flipped or displaced, and power poles were downed as the tornado moved east-southeast through neighborhoods, while homes generally sustained minor siding and shingle damage during this phase. The tornado later intensified, causing more concentrated tree damage and moderate exterior damage to several houses, including gutters, decks, awnings, and roofing. At its peak, the tornado completely lifted the roof from one home and hurled large debris, including roof rafters, more than 100 yd (91 m) into nearby houses, with insulation and siding scattered across the area. The tornado quickly weakened and dissipated shortly thereafter.						
EF2	Sea Girt	Monmouth	NJ	40.1223°N 74.0398°W	23:42–23:44	0.14 mi (0.23 km)	50 yd (46 m)
EF2	A strong tornado likely formed over Stockton Lake and moved east-southeast across the New Jersey Youth Challenge Academy, where it caused its most significant damage. A large section of a wood-framed, shingled roof was completely torn from an academy building and thrown east-northeast, with debris scattered for roughly 250 yd (230 m) in a curved, tapering pattern. An additional tree was uprooted and laid down in the same general direction. The tornado weakened and lifted as it moved across a parking lot and adjacent open grass fields.						
EF1	Mays Landing	Atlantic	NJ	39.4738°N 74.8579°W	23:42–23:43	0.9 mi (1.4 km)	110 yd (100 m)
EF1	This tornado touched down just south of US 40 in a heavily forested area, snapping large branches and damaging trees. As it moved east into Mays Landing, it reached peak intensity by partially lifting the roof from a single-family home, with numerous trees on the property suffering broken limbs and uprooting nearby. Continuing eastward, the tornado produced extensive tree damage, including snapped trunks and uprooted trees concentrated along one side of its path. The damage gradually diminished as the tornado moved into a dense forested area, where it ultimately lifted.						

== See also ==
- Tornadoes of 2023
- List of United States tornadoes in March 2023
- List of United States tornadoes from April to May 2023
- List of North American tornadoes and tornado outbreaks
