= Sublette =

Sublette may refer to:

== People ==
- Sublette (surname), a French-language surname

== Places ==
- Sublette Township, Lee County, Illinois
  - Sublette, Illinois
- Sublette, Kansas
- Sublette, Missouri
- Sublette, New Mexico
- Sublette County, Wyoming
- Sublette Mountain, Lincoln County, Wyoming

== See also ==
- Sublett, Kentucky
