= Woodhaven =

Woodhaven may refer to the following places:

- Woodhaven, Fife, Scotland
- Woodhaven, Fort Worth, Texas, U.S.
- Woodhaven, Michigan, U.S.
- Woodhaven, Queens, New York, U.S.
- Woodhaven, Winnipeg, St. James-Assiniboia, Manitoba, Canada

== See also ==
- Woodhaven Lakes, a private camping resort in Sublette, Illinois
