= Kittrell, Tennessee =

Unincorporated community in Tennessee, US

Coordinates: 35°49′25″N 86°14′41″W

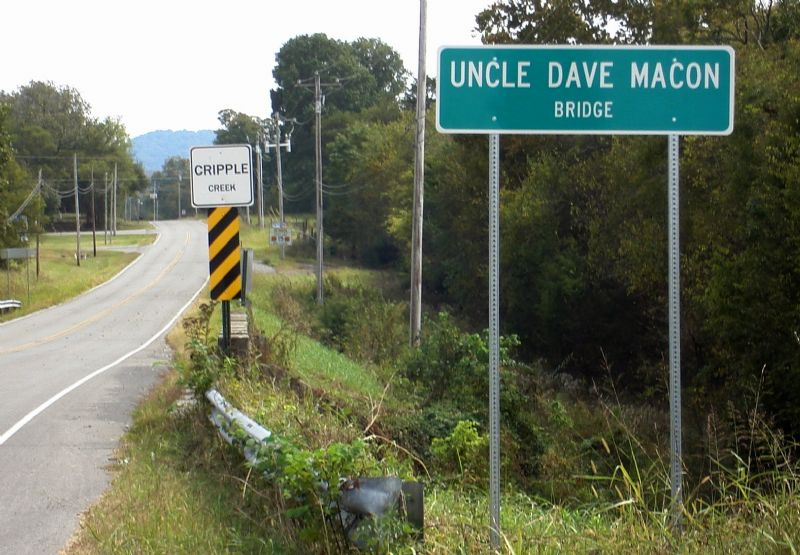
Cripple Creek bridge in Kittrell

Kittrell is an unincorporated community along U.S. Route 70S in Rutherford County, Tennessee, located seven miles east of Murfreesboro. It shares the zip code of 37149 assigned to Readyville.

The community is named for Major Marion B. Kittrell who sold his farm and moved to the area around Cripple Creek on July 18, 1874. A post office was established in 1884 but discontinued with the adoption of rural free delivery around 1903. Kittrell has been home to several schools and churches over the years that have been disused or destroyed by fire. Uncle Dave Macon purchased a home in the community in 1900 that still stands today. Other prominent landmarks include Pilot Knob (also claimed by Readyville), an elementary school, a community park with two baseball fields, and a public health building with fire department.
