= Soublette =

Soublette is a surname, a variant of Sublette. Notable people with this surname include:

- Carlos Soublette (1789 – 1870), former President of Venezuela
- Juan Gabriel Valdés Soublette (born 1947), Chilean scientist, diplomat and former minister
- Isaac José Pardo Soublette (1905 – 2000), Venezuelan intellectual, politician, journalist, and essayist
- Sylvia Soublette (1924–2020) Chilean composer

== See also ==
- La Soublette, a neighborhood of Catia La Mar, Venezuela
