= Bartlett Woods =

State park in Illinois, United States

Bartlett's Woods Nature Preserve
- IUCN category V (protected landscape/seascape)
- Location within Illinois Location within the United States
- Location: Lee County, Illinois, US
- Nearest city: Sublette, Illinois
- Coordinates: 41°37′10.376″N 89°10′5.882″W
- Area: 23 acres (9.3 ha)
- Established: July 1987
- Governing body: Illinois Nature Preserves Commission; Lee County Soil and Water Conservation District

Bartlett Woods (formerly Knox Grove) is a 23 acres (9.3 ha) nature preserve located in Lee County, Illinois, US, situated along the bank of the Big Bureau Creek. It is a remnant of a larger forest which is no longer extant.

== History ==
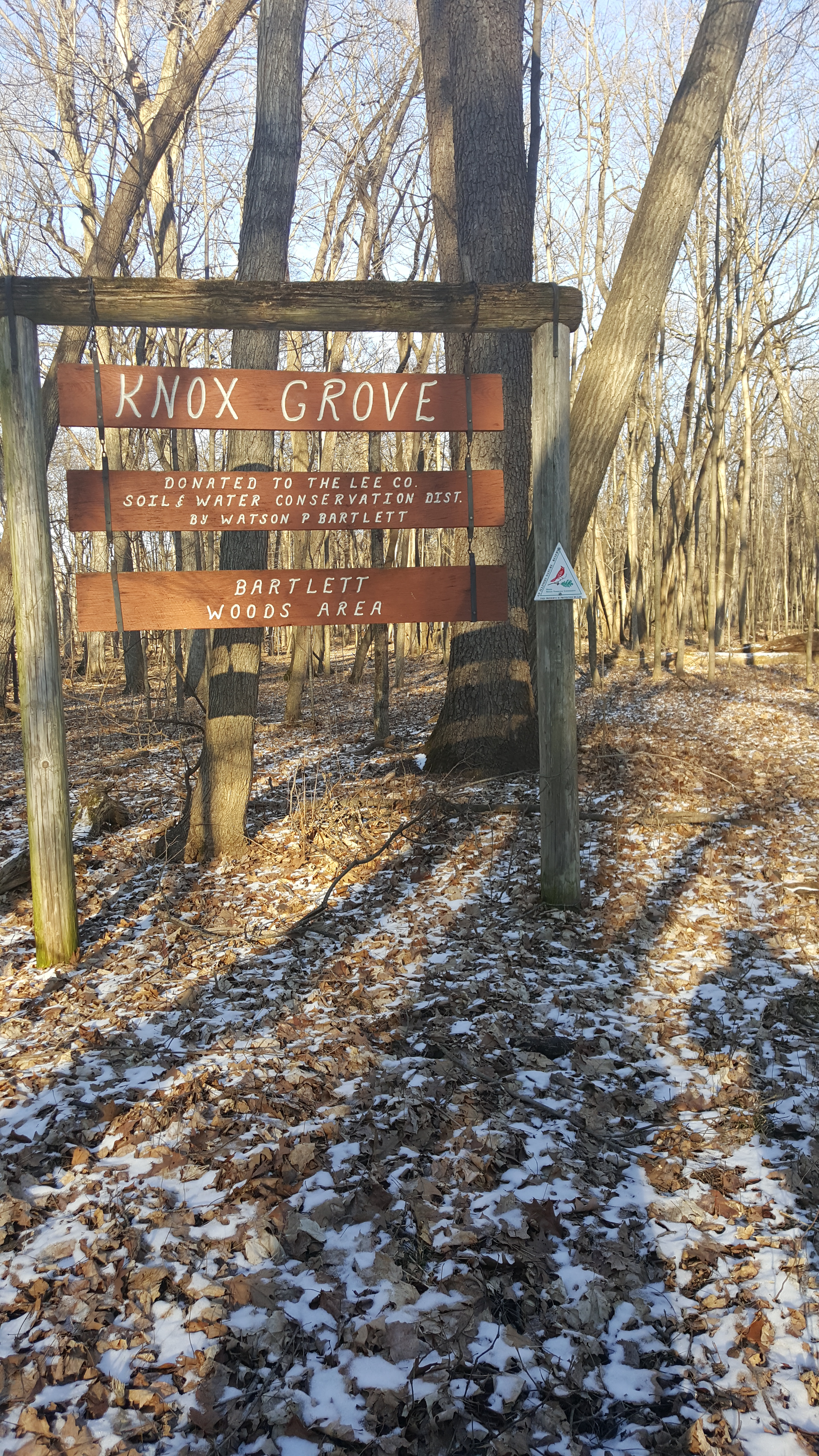
Entrance to Nature Preserve

The name Knox Grove is derived from William Knox, who first settled the area around 1830. By 1846, Knox Grove was a settlement of roughly 14 families covering an area of 2–3 square miles (5.2–7.8 km^{2}). The following year, the first schoolhouse was started out of the (now abandoned) home of Mr. Knox.

In 1848, an American black bear weighing 400 pounds (180 kg) was reported as being killed by a group of men in the northern reach of the grove. That same year, a post office opened under the name of Ovid.

By 1855, the Illinois Central Railroad's choice of routing led to the creation of the nearby town of Sublette, where the majority of the population of Knox Grove shortly relocated.

== Ecology ==
Bartlett Woods lies in a flat depression between the Theiss and LaMoille moraines which were deposited during Pleistocene glaciation. Within the woods, several shallow ravines drain excess water from the mesic upland forest into Bureau Creek. The most common tree species are sugar maple, red and white oak, red elm and basswood. To a lesser extent, black walnut, butternut and hophornbeam can be found in certain areas of the preserve. The herbaceous layer contains regionally common wildflowers such as doll's eyes, columbine, trout lily and miterwort. The undeveloped forest is also home to a sizable population of white-tailed deer as well as smaller fauna such as pheasants and groundhogs.
