= Readyville Mill =

- U.S. National Register of Historic Places
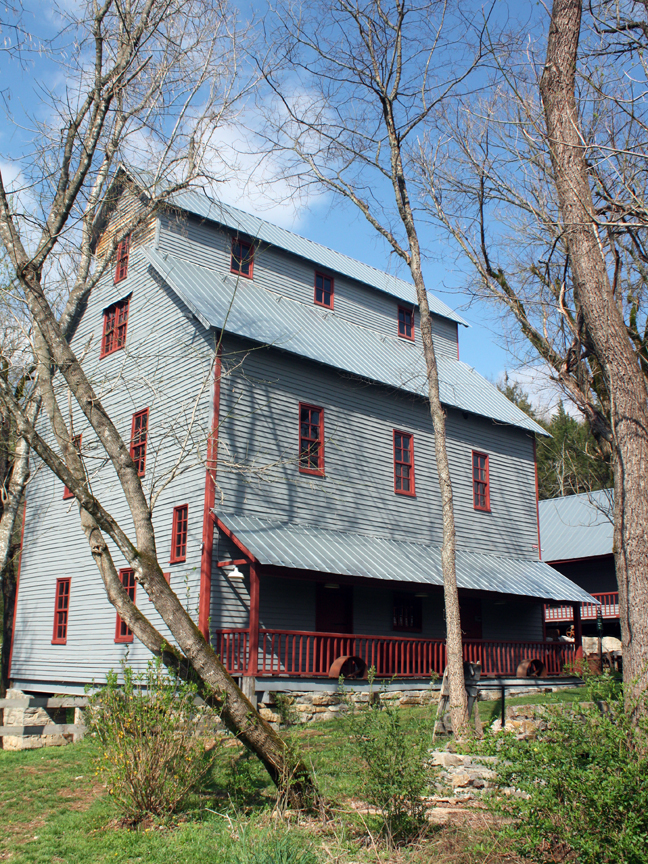
- Readyville Mill

- Location within Tennessee Location within the United States
- Location: On U.S. 70S, Readyville, Tennessee
- Coordinates: 35°49′48″N 86°10′35″W
- Area: 8 acres (3.2 ha)
- Built: 1868
- NRHP reference No.: 73001753
- Added to NRHP: July 2, 1973

The Readyville Mill was a historic mill located in Readyville, Tennessee, located in Cannon County, near the border of Rutherford County. It was added to the National Register of Historic Places on June 12, 1973 and featured on an episode of Tennessee Crossroads in 2015.

The original water-powered grist mill was constructed by the community founder Colonel Charles Ready in 1812. Ownership of the mill remained in the family until it burned down during the American Civil War for unknown reasons. Robert Carter rebuilt the mill in the 1870s and acquired full ownership of it in 1884. After being engaged in several different trades for several different owners, the mill closed in 1978. In 2009, the mill was reopened after a three-year renovation as a privately owned restaurant. The grounds consisted of five newly restored buildings: The Grist Mill, Granary, Icehouse, Miller's Cabin, and Smokehouse. In February 2023, the restaurant and mill were once again closed after several recent changes of management and ownership.

The mill building and grounds were destroyed by an EF2 tornado around 1:55 a.m. on April 1, 2023. The debris was cleared in March 2024.

== Photo Gallery ==
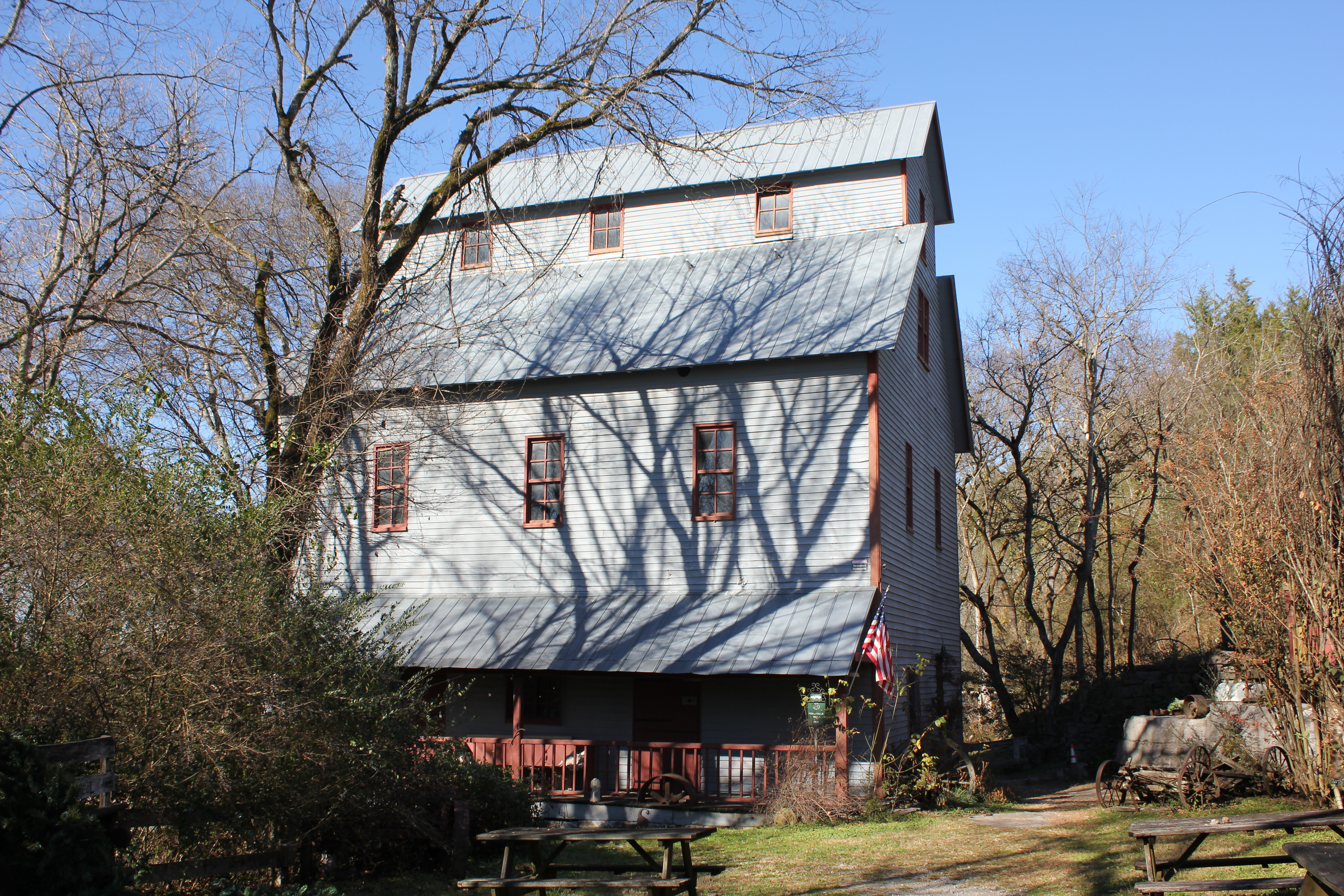
Readyville Mill (2020)

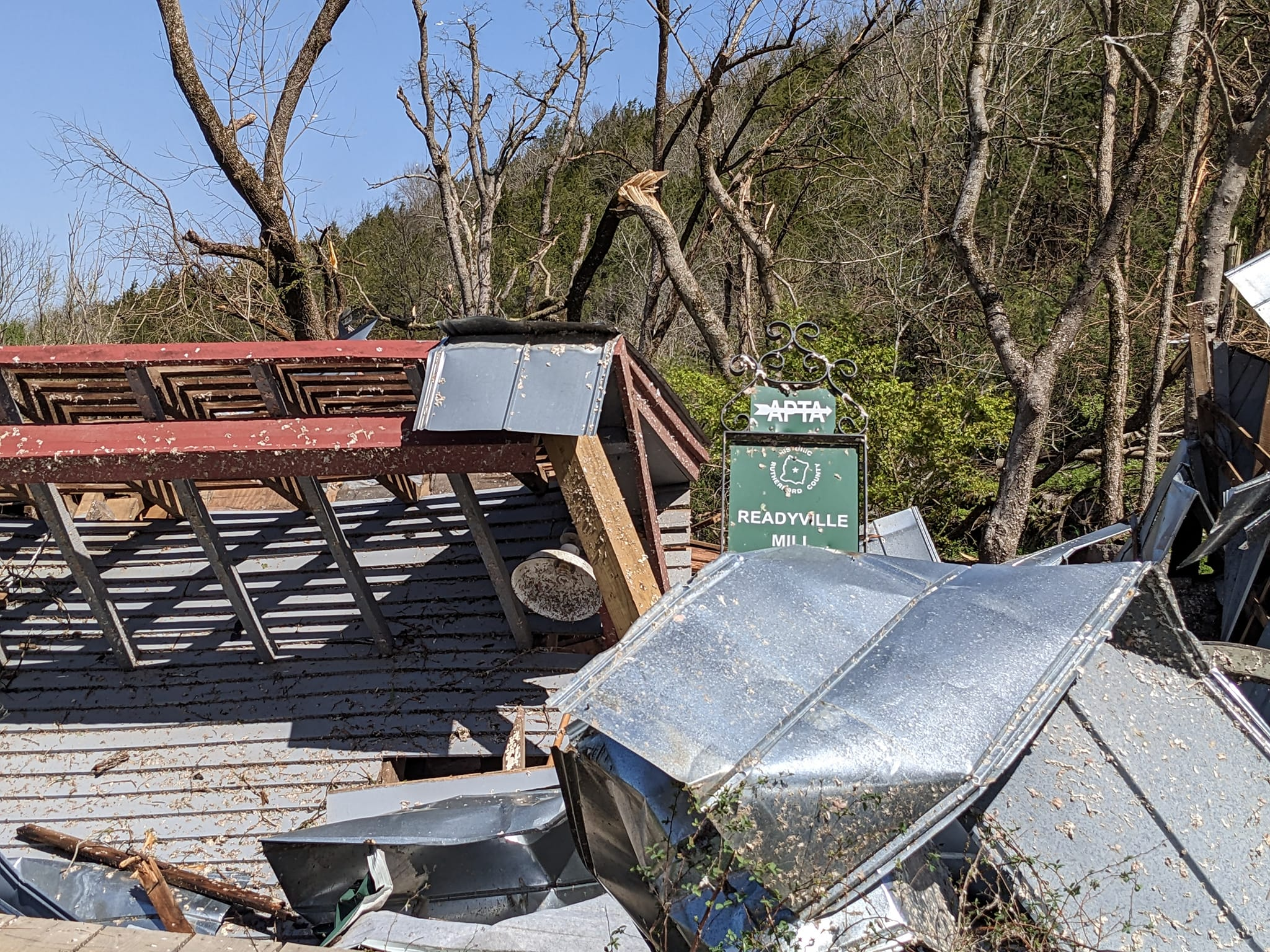
Readyville Mill after tornado (2023)
