= Sublette, Illinois =

Sublette, Illinois Hanno (1850-1854)
- Village
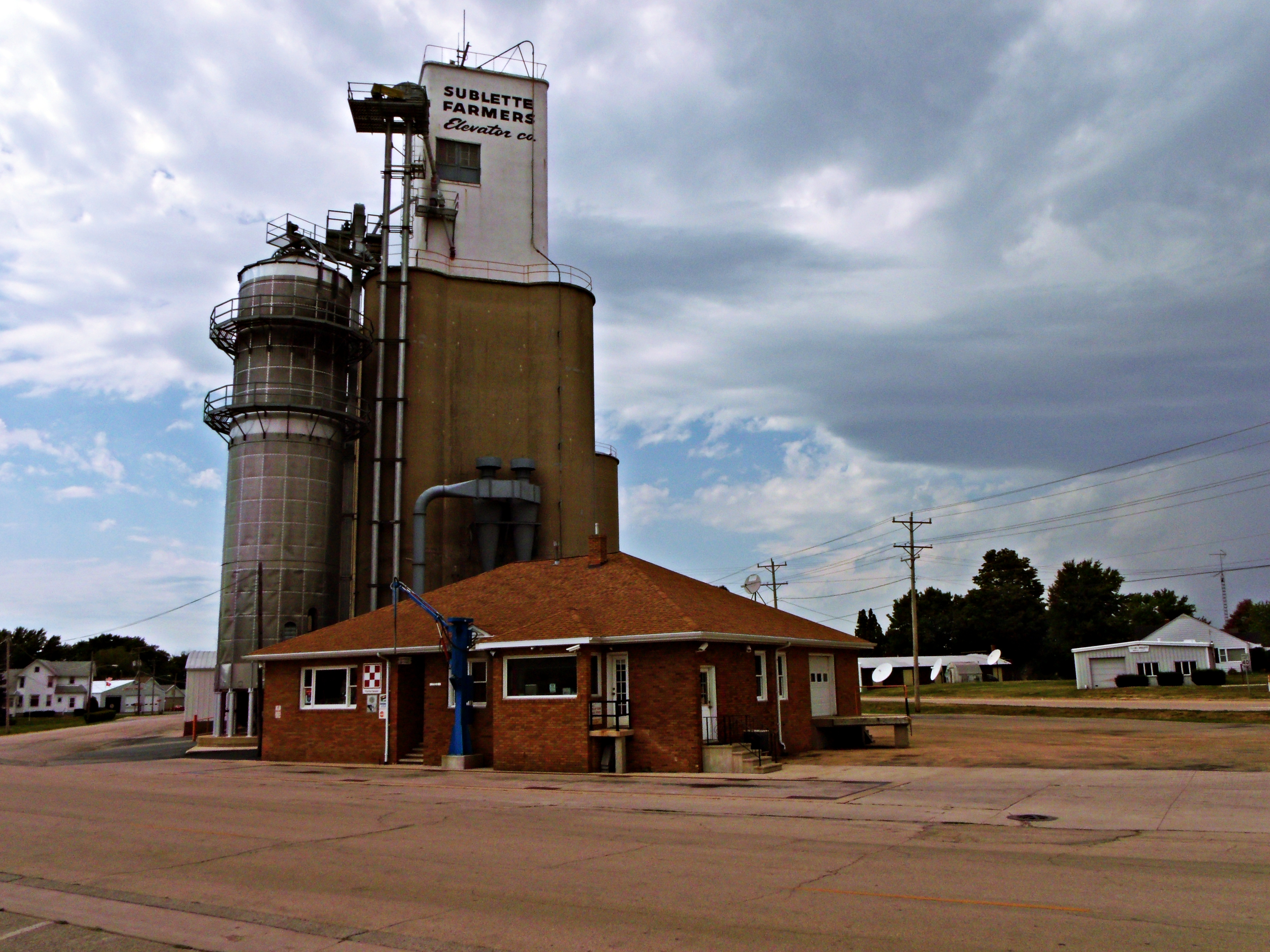
- Sublette Farmers Co grain silo in downtown Sublette

- Location in Lee County, Illinois
- Coordinates: 41°38′35″N 89°13′44″W
- Country: United States
- State: Illinois
- County: Lee
- Township: Sublette
- Incorporated: February 18, 1857

Government
  - Village president: John Stenzel

Area
  - Total: 0.40 sq mi (1.04 km^{2})
  - Land: 0.40 sq mi (1.04 km^{2})
  - Water: 0 sq mi (0.00 km^{2})
- Elevation: 922 ft (281 m)

Population (2020)
  - Total: 380
  - Density: 948.0/sq mi (366.04/km^{2})
- Time zone: UTC-6 (CST)
  - Summer (DST): UTC-5 (CDT)
- ZIP code: 61367
- Area code: 815
- FIPS code: 17-73287
- GNIS feature ID: 2399924
- Website: www.subletteweb.com

Sublette is a village in Lee County, Illinois, United States. As of the 2020 census, Sublette had a population of 380.

== History ==
The earliest references to Sublette as a town are from plat maps dating to the 1850s. At this point in time, Sublette was known as "Hanno" (named for Hanau, Prussia). It was a small cluster of houses just north of the settlement at Knox Grove.

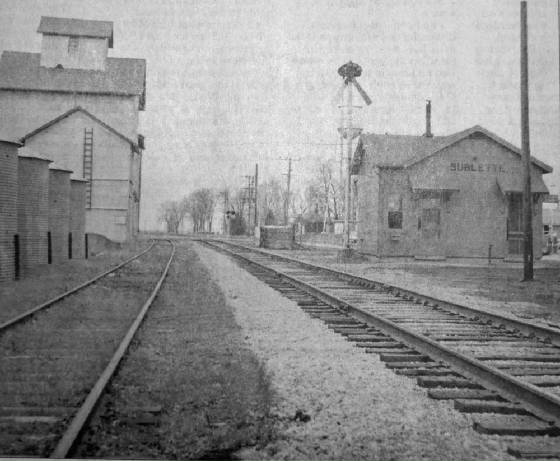
Sublette train depot (right side)

In 1854, the Illinois Central Railroad built a line through Hanno and constructed a depot there for passenger and freight services. A plat map from the following year lists the town's name as being "Soublette" or the "Town of Soublett". The town name was officially changed to "Sublette" by an act of the state legislature in 1857. The name is unaffiliated with the town being sublet from the railroad; it likely traces back to an Americanized spelling of the French surname Soblet.

== Geography ==
U.S. Route 52 passes through the village as North Pennsylvania Avenue. US 52 leads northwest 7 miles (11 km) to Amboy and southeast 9 miles (14 km) to Mendota. Dixon, the Lee county seat, is 20 miles (32 km) northwest of Sublette via US 52.

Woodhaven Lakes, a private camping resort, is 3 miles (5 km) northwest of Sublette.

According to the 2021 census gazetteer files, Sublette has a total area of 0.32 square miles (0.83 km^{2}), all land.

== Demographics ==
Historical population
Census	Pop.	Note	%±
1900	306		—
1910	287		−6.2%
1920	262		−8.7%
1930	261		−0.4%
1940	282		8.0%
1950	290		2.8%
1960	306		5.5%
1970	361		18.0%
1980	442		22.4%
1990	394		−10.9%
2000	456		15.7%
2010	449		−1.5%
2020	380		−15.4%
U.S. Decennial Census

As of the 2020 census there were 380 people, 179 households, and 98 families residing in the village. The population density was 1,183.80 inhabitants per square mile (457.07/km^{2}). There were 208 housing units at an average density of 647.98 per square mile (250.19/km^{2}). The racial makeup of the village was 93.42% White, 0.00% African American, 0.26% Native American, 0.00% Asian, 0.00% Pacific Islander, 2.37% from other races, and 3.95% from two or more races. Hispanic or Latino of any race were 7.63% of the population.

There were 179 households, out of which 26.8% had children under the age of 18 living with them, 40.22% were married couples living together, 6.15% had a female householder with no husband present, and 45.25% were non-families. 36.31% of all households were made up of individuals, and 26.82% had someone living alone who was 65 years of age or older. The average household size was 2.61 and the average family size was 2.14.

The village's age distribution consisted of 16.2% under the age of 18, 6.0% from 18 to 24, 21.6% from 25 to 44, 25.3% from 45 to 64, and 30.8% who were 65 years of age or older. The median age was 49.0 years. For every 100 females, there were 112.8 males. For every 100 females age 18 and over, there were 107.1 males.

The median income for a household in the village was $55,313, and the median income for a family was $59,500. Males had a median income of $47,000 versus $24,167 for females. The per capita income for the village was $32,620. About 4.1% of families and 9.4% of the population were below the poverty line, including 3.8% of those under age 18 and 11.0% of those age 65 or over.

== Education ==
It is in the Amboy Community Unit School District 272.
