= Readyville, Tennessee =

- Town
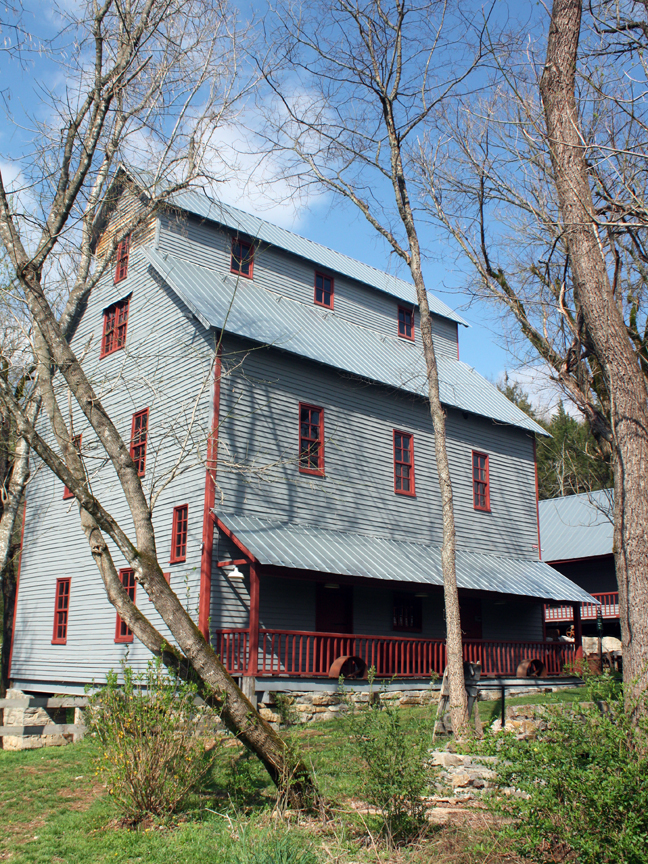
- Readyville Mill

- Location within Tennessee Location within the United States
- Coordinates: 35°49′41″N 86°10′29″W
- Country: United States
- State: Tennessee
- County: Cannon County, Tennessee
- Elevation: 633 ft (193 m)
- Time zone: UTC-6
  - Summer (DST): UTC-5
- ZIP code: 37149
- Area code: 615
- GNIS feature ID: 1299014

Readyville [US: /rɪdɪvil/ ] is a town located primarily in Cannon County, Tennessee, United States and secondarily in Rutherford County, Tennessee, United States. It lies approximately halfway between Murfreesboro and Woodbury with an assigned zip code of 37149. Readyville is not a Census-designated place but has a zip-code based population estimate of 2,500-3,000 residents.

== History ==
Prior to the settlement of European Americans, the region was occupied by the indigenous peoples of the Yuchi and Cherokee Nations. The Yuchi left the region in the 1700s and the Cherokee were forcibly relocated in the late 1830s by the United States government in the Trail of Tears.

The current community was founded by and named for Colonel Charles Ready, an early settler who arrived in the area in 1802. In 1811, Ready established the first community post office, currently located in Rutherford County. The following year, while mayor of Murfreesboro, he constructed the Readyville Mill on the east fork of Stones River in Cannon County. The mill was destroyed in a fire of unknown origin during the American Civil War, rebuilt in the 1870s, and added to the National Register of Historic Places on June 12, 1973. After a 2006 restoration, one of the auxiliary buildings was operated as a restaurant on most weekends from 2009 until February 2023 under three different owners.

Colonel Charles Ready's son, also named Charles Ready, was born in Readyville in 1802, elected to the Tennessee House of Representatives in 1835, and elected to the United States House of Representatives for Tennessee's 5th congressional district in 1853. Their former home, the Charles Ready House, is located in Cannon County, directly on the Rutherford County border across from the post office. The house was added to the National Register of Historic Places on July 2, 1973. The house is currently under private ownership, but was formerly available to the public as a bed and breakfast and multipurpose venue.

Readyville is also home to the Uncle Dave Macon House, located in Rutherford County, purchased by Grand Ole Opry star Uncle Dave Macon in 1900, and added to the National Register of Historic Places on November 15, 1973. The house is currently under private ownership. It is also claimed by the unincorporated community of Kittrell but has a Readyville mailing address. Pilot Knob, Readyville's notable landmark that rises about 600 feet (180 m) in elevation from its base, is referenced in the Uncle Dave Macon song "The Fox Chase" and is viewable from the Uncle Dave Macon House. Pilot Knob is privately owned, and trespassing is explicitly prohibited.

Two racially segregated schools were once in operation in the community during the twentieth century but are no longer standing. Construction on John Bragg Highway, which provides a direct connection between Murfreesboro and Woodbury while circumventing the central portion of Readyville, was completed in approximately 1992, causing traffic through the center of Readyville to drop significantly. The community's earliest confirmed tornado touchdown happened on April 10, 2009, at 12:19 p.m. An EF0 tornado was on the ground for 0.8 miles and caused minor damage while it moved east across Locke Creek Road, which lies to the east of the downtown area.

On April 1, 2023, at approximately 1:55 a.m., Readyville was struck by a strong EF2 tornado with winds estimated at 130 mph (210 km/h). The bulk of the downtown area was heavily damaged or destroyed, including the Readyville Mill, Charles Ready House, post office, market, and numerous homes. Two people were injured. The following day, the American Red Cross and nearly 800 volunteers showed up for recovery efforts.

== Photo Gallery ==
Several buildings in town, as photographed in 2020:

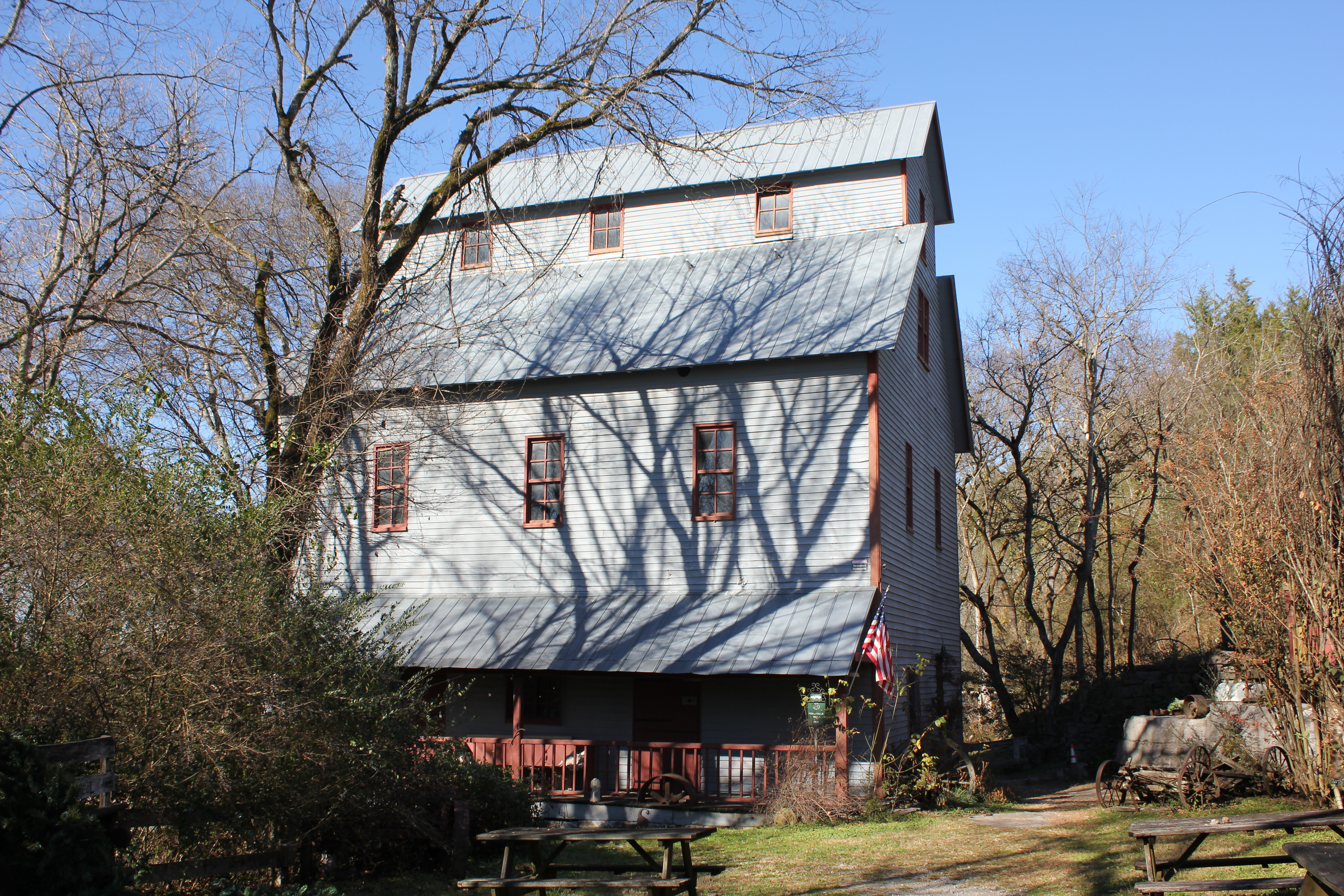
Readyville Mill

Former lumberyard

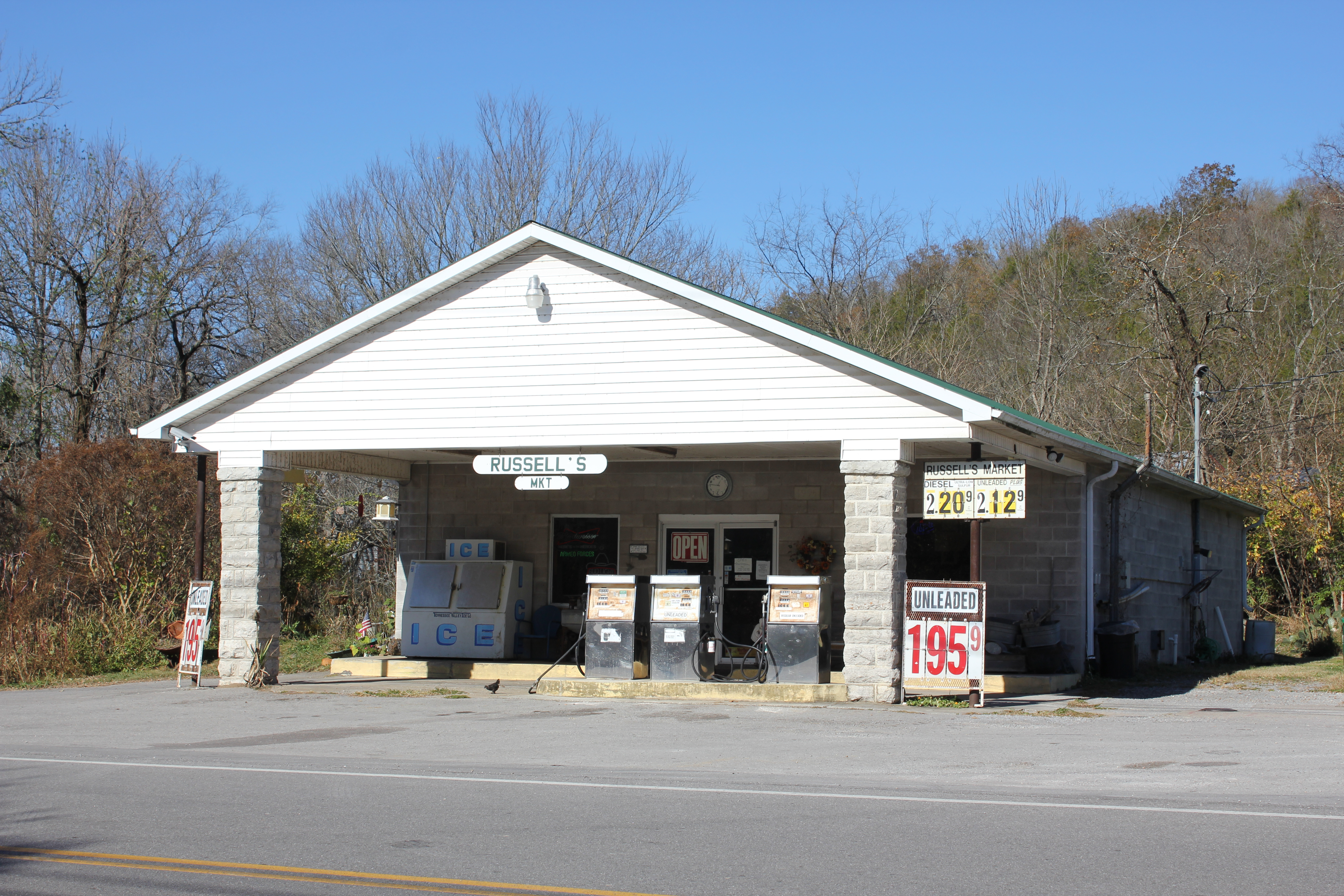
Market

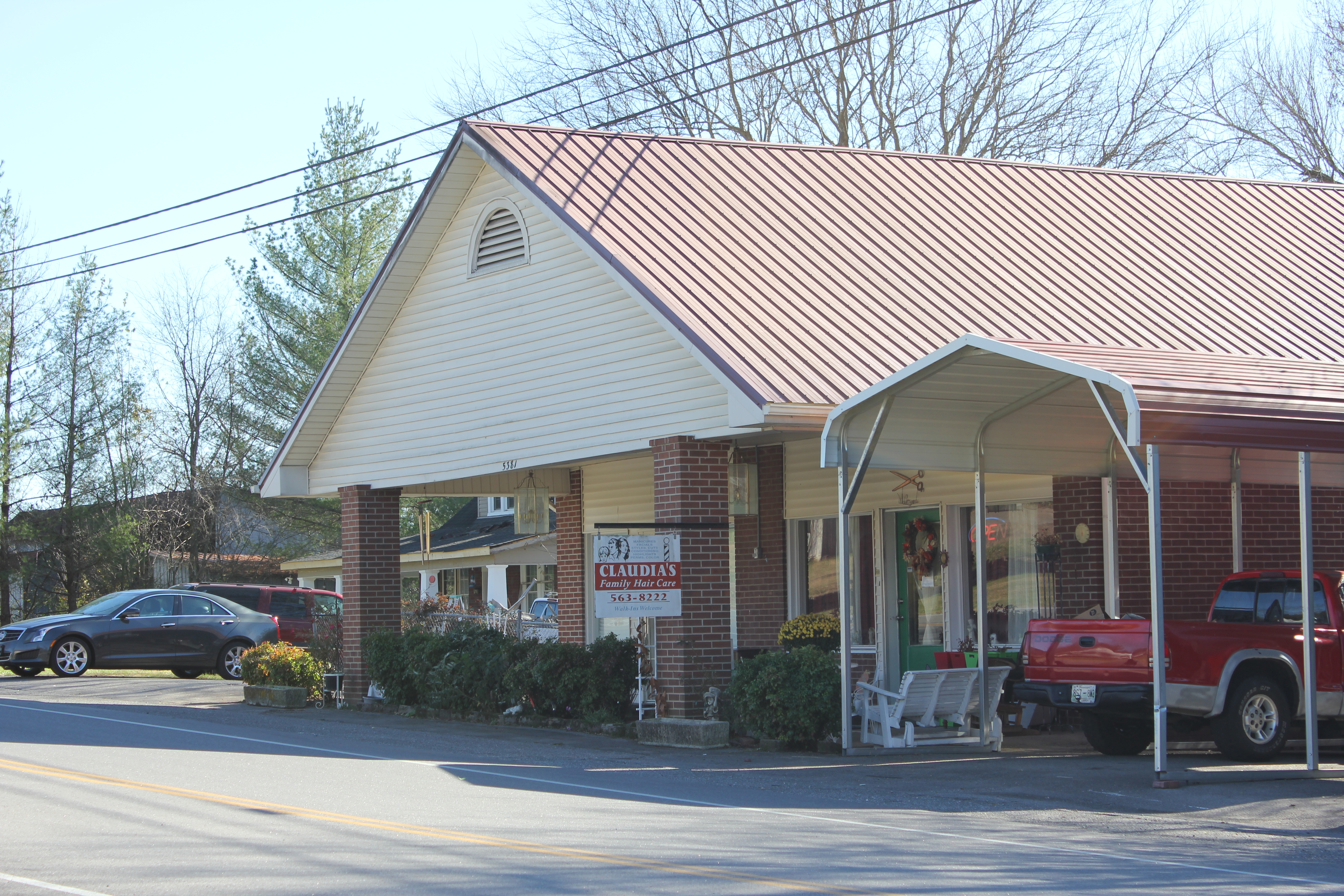
Business

Post Office

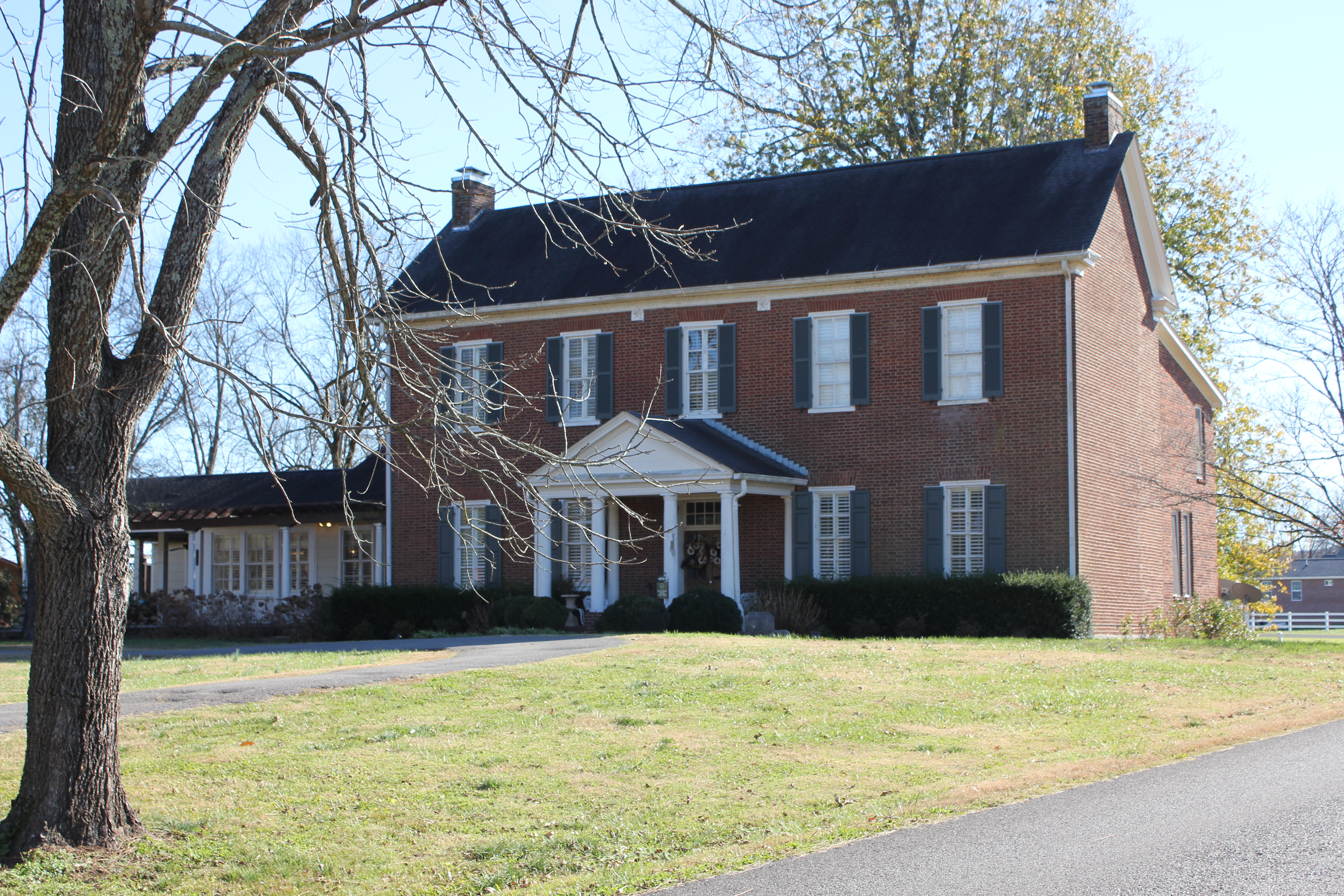
Charles Ready House

Uncle Dave Macon House

Pilot Knob
