= Sublette Township, Lee County, Illinois =

Sublette Township
- Township
- Location in Lee County

- Lee County's location in Illinois
- Country: United States
- State: Illinois
- County: Lee

Government
  - Supervisor: Daniel M. Stephenitch

Area
  - Total: 36.55 sq mi (94.7 km^{2})
  - Land: 36.2 sq mi (94 km^{2})
  - Water: 0.03 sq mi (0.078 km^{2}) 0.07%
- Elevation: 896 ft (273 m)

Population (2010)
  - Total: 675
  - Density: 18.6/sq mi (7.20/km^{2})
- Time zone: UTC-6 (CST)
  - Summer (DST): UTC-5 (CDT)
- FIPS code: 17-103-73300

Sublette Township is located in Lee County, Illinois. As of the 2020 census, its population was 675 and it contained 350 housing units. Sublette Township was originally named Hanno Township, but it was renamed at an unknown date. The village of Sublette is located within the township.

== Geography ==
According to the 2021 census gazetteer files, Sublette Township has a total area of 36.55 square miles (94.66 km^{2}), of which 36.52 square miles (94.59 km^{2}) (or 99.93%) is land and 0.03 square miles (0.08 km^{2}) (or 0.07%) is water.

== Demographics ==
As of the 2020 census there were 675 people, 339 households, and 202 families residing in the township. The population density was 18.47 inhabitants per square mile (7.13/km^{2}). There were 350 housing units at an average density of 9.58 per square mile (3.70/km^{2}). The racial makeup of the township was 93.78% White, 0.00% African American, 0.44% Native American, 0.89% Asian, 0.00% Pacific Islander, 1.78% from other races, and 3.11% from two or more races. Hispanic or Latino of any race were 6.81% of the population.

There were 339 households, out of which 26.30% had children under the age of 18 living with them, 51.92% were married couples living together, 3.24% had a female householder with no spouse present, and 40.41% were non-families. 35.70% of all households were made up of individuals, and 14.20% had someone living alone who was 65 years of age or older. The average household size was 2.10 and the average family size was 2.62.

The township's age distribution consisted of 15.2% under the age of 18, 3.8% from 18 to 24, 32.1% from 25 to 44, 29.1% from 45 to 64, and 19.8% who were 65 years of age or older. The median age was 44.0 years. For every 100 females, there were 115.8 males. For every 100 females age 18 and over, there were 126.2 males.

The median income for a household in the township was $59,306, and the median income for a family was $86,458. Males had a median income of $54,911 versus $27,321 for females. The per capita income for the township was $39,927. About 2.0% of families and 6.1% of the population were below the poverty line, including 2.0% of those under age 18 and 9.2% of those age 65 or over.

Historical population
| Census | Pop. | Note | %± |
|---|---|---|---|
| 2010 | 776 | | — |
| 2020 | 675 | | −13.0% |
U.S. Decennial Census
