= Charles Ready House =

Historic house in Tennessee, United States

- U.S. National Register of Historic Places
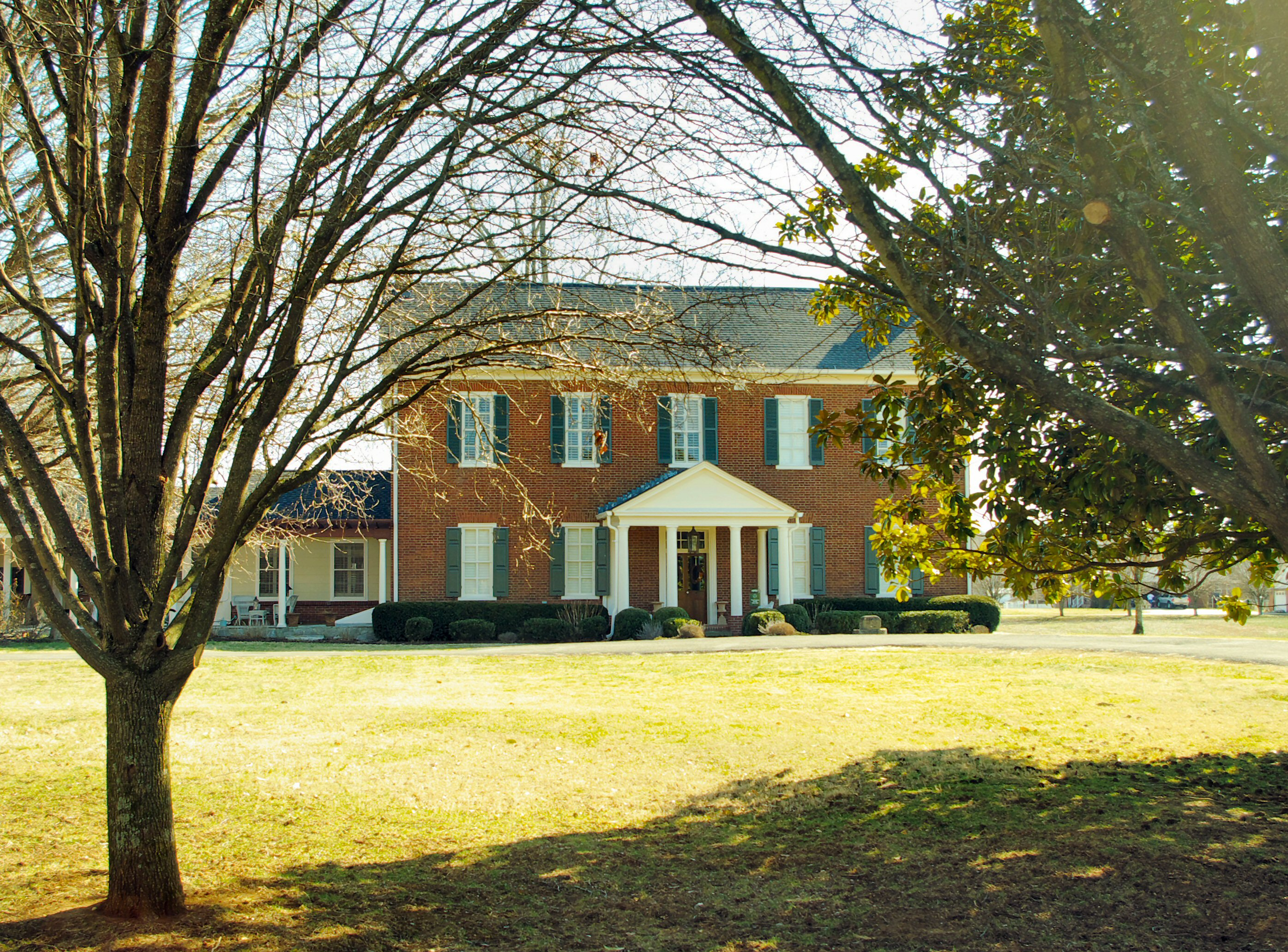
- The Corners in 2014

- Location within Tennessee Location within the United States
- Location: On U.S. 70S, Readyville, Tennessee
- Coordinates: 35°49′45″N 86°10′47″W
- Area: 9 acres (3.6 ha)
- Architectural style: Federal
- NRHP reference No.: 73001828
- Added to NRHP: July 2, 1973

The Charles Ready House, also known as The Corners, is a historic house in Readyville, Tennessee, United States. It is located in Cannon County, on the border of Rutherford County.

== History ==
The house was built for the town settler Colonel Charles Ready in 1829. The house was run as an inn whose guests included Presidents Andrew Jackson, Martin Van Buren and James K. Polk. Upon Ready's death in 1859, it was inherited by his daughter Jane and her husband, Peter Talley.

During the American Civil War, the house was visited by members of both the Confederate States Army and the Union Army. Confederate Army General Nathan Bedford Forrest and his troops dined in the house on July 13, 1862. In 1863, it was used by Union Colonel William Babcock Hazen and his troops.

The house is currently under private ownership. It was available to the public as a bed and breakfast or multipurpose venue until it closed to the public in December 2020. The house was heavily damaged in a tornado on April 1, 2023, around 1:55 a.m. Reconstruction efforts are currently under way with a target completion of December 2024.

== Architectural significance ==
The house was designed in the Federal architectural style. It has been listed on the National Register of Historic Places since July 2, 1973.

== Photo Gallery ==
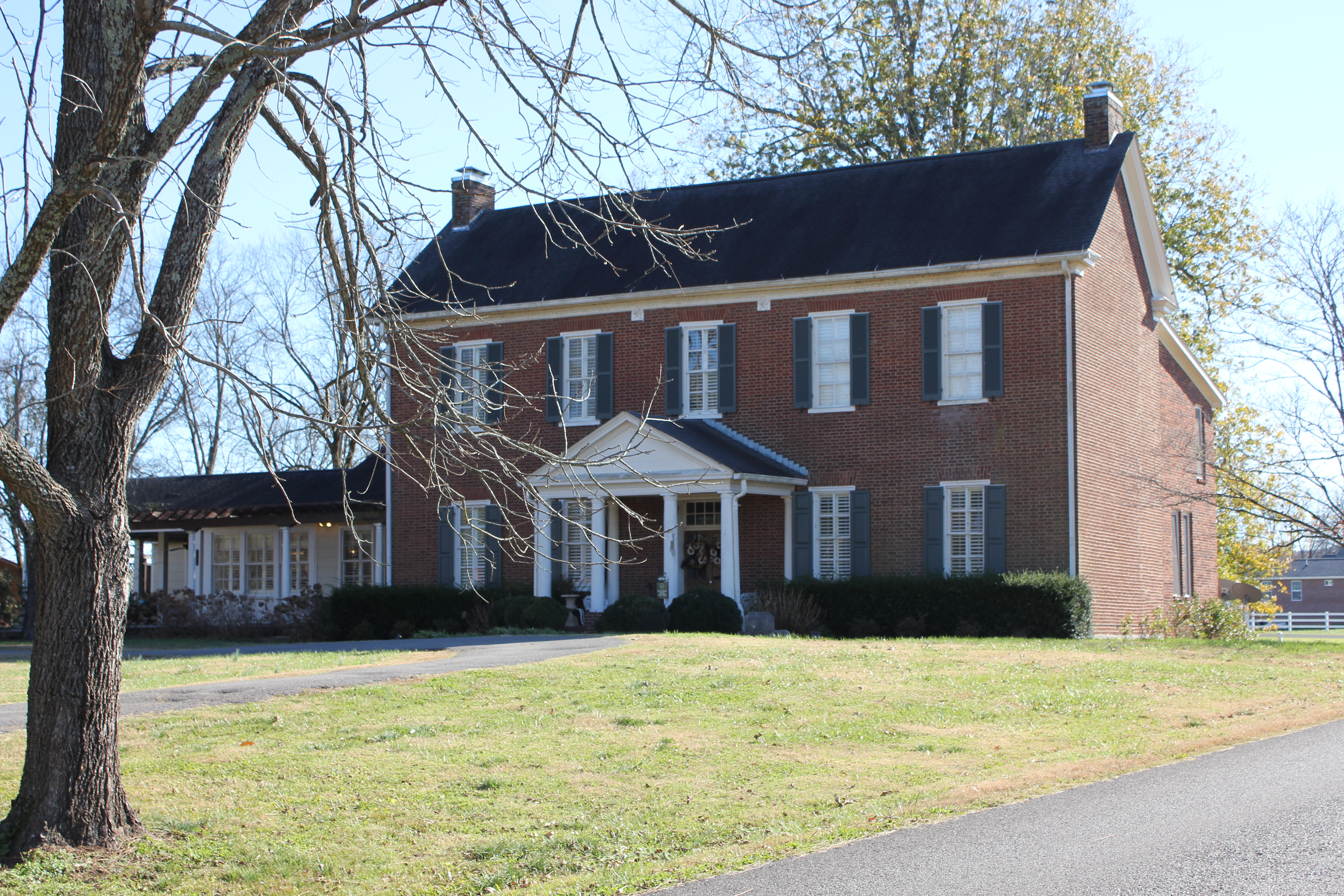
Charles Ready House (2020)

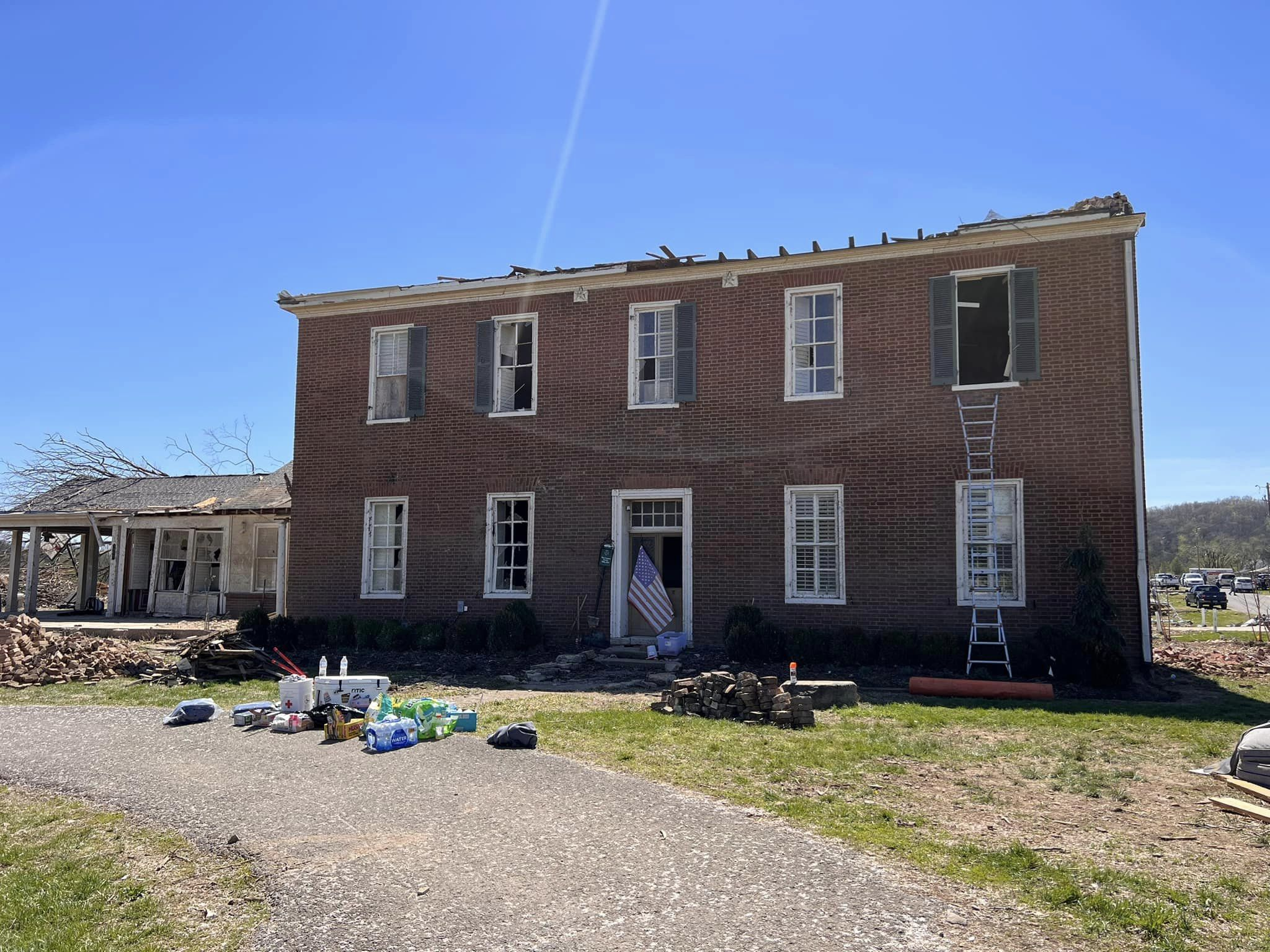
Charles Ready House damaged (2023)
