= Uncle Dave Macon House =

Historic house in Tennessee, United States

- U.S. National Register of Historic Places
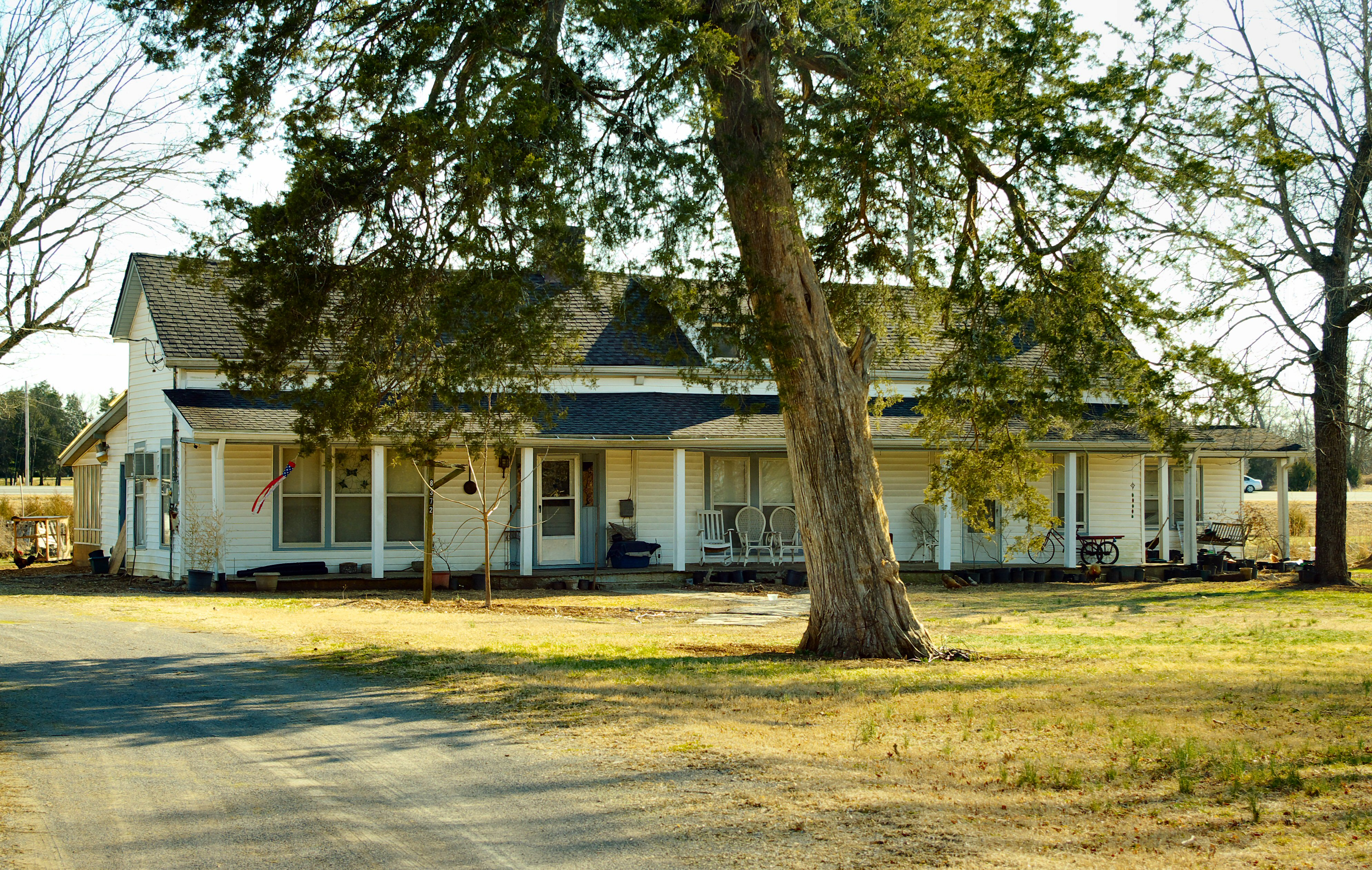
- The Uncle Dave Macon House in 2014

- Location within Tennessee
- Nearest city: Readyville, Tennessee
- Coordinates: 35°49′27″N 86°14′27″W
- Area: 8 acres (3.2 ha)
- NRHP reference No.: 73001827
- Added to NRHP: November 15, 1973

The Uncle Dave Macon House is a historic house in Readyville, Tennessee, U.S.. It was built as a log cabin in 1843. It was purchased by country music performer Uncle Dave Macon in 1900. He resided there until his death in 1952. It has been listed on the National Register of Historic Places since November 15, 1973.
