= Woodhaven Lakes =

Private Campground in Illinois, United States

Coordinates: 41°39′30″N 89°16′51″W

Woodhaven Lakes is a privately owned camping resort, located in Sublette, Illinois in the United States.

Established in 1971 as a gated, members-only campground, Woodhaven Lakes comprises 1,756 acres (7.11 km^{2}) of woodlands, seven man-made lakes, and over 15 miles (24 km) of hiking trails.

== Lakes in the resort ==
- Bass Lake (25.8 acres (10.4 ha))
- Black Oak Lake (6.5 acres (2.6 ha))
- Blue Gill Lake (0.5 acres (0.20 ha))
- Hidden Lake (1.5 acres (0.61 ha))
- Pine Lake (2 acres (0.81 ha))
- Sunset Lake (7.2 acres (2.9 ha))
- Woodhaven Lake (26.8 acres (10.8 ha))

The total area of the lakes is 70.3 acres (28.4 ha).

== 2015 tornado ==
On June 22, 2015, an EF-2 tornado touched down near Sublette, Illinois before damaging 700 acres (2.8 km^{2}) of Woodhaven Lakes campground. 5 people were injured, several hundred campers were severely damaged, and thousands of trees were uprooted. 5 days later, on June 27, campers were allowed to return to the site to assess the damages caused by the storm.
