= Sublette (surname) =

Sublette is a variant of the French language surname Soblet. Other variations include Sublet, Sublett, and Soublet. In the United States, the Soblet family name traces back to French Huguenot refugee Abraham Soblet and his family, who arrived in Virginia in 1700 and settled in Manakintown.

== Notable people with Soblet/Sublett/Sublette surnames ==
- A. T. Sublett (1883 – 1961), American college football and baseball player
- James Sublett, one of the first large-scale farmers in the Rio Grande valley of Texas, owner of Rancho Estelle
- Jesse Sublett (born 1954), American author and musician
- John William Sublett (1902 – 1986), known by his stage name John W. Bubbles, a vaudeville performer.
- Andrew Sublette (1808–1854), American mountain man
- Milton Sublette (c. 1801 – 1837), American mountain man
- William Sublette (1798–1845), American mountain man
- Bill Sublette (born 1963), Floridian politician
- Ned Sublette (born 1951), American musician and scholar
