= Boxwood (disambiguation) =

Boxwood may refer to:

- Buxus, a genus of about 70 species of shrubs and trees in the family Buxaceæ, called "boxwood" in North America, but just "box" in the majority of English-speaking countries (though its wood is "boxwood").
  - Buxus sempervirens, the most common species of Buxus, and the only one called "boxwood" in United Kingdom
- Boxwood (Murfreesboro, Tennessee), a Greek Revival house built in 1840
- Boxwood (Talladega, Alabama), listed on the National Register of Historic Places in Talladega County, Alabama
- Boxwood, s nickname for the Boston Terrier breed.

== See also ==
- Cornus florida or false boxwood, a species of dogwood (not a true boxwood)
- Boxwood Hall, the Elizabeth, New Jersey, home of Elias Boudinot from 1772 to 1795
- Boxwood Public School, a school in Markham, Ontario
