= Evergreen Cemetery (Murfreesboro, Tennessee) =

Cemetery in Rutherford County, Tennessee

- Interactive map of Evergreen Cemetery

Details
- Established: 1872
- Location: 519 Greenland Drive; Murfreesboro, Tennessee
- Country: U.S.
- Coordinates: 35°52′14″N 86°22′43″W
- Type: Public, City
- Owned by: Evergreen Cemetery Commission; City of Murfreesboro, Tennessee
- Size: 90 acres (36 ha)
- No. of graves: ~20,000
- Find a Grave: Evergreen Cemetery
- The Political Graveyard: Evergreen Cemetery

Evergreen Cemetery is a 90-acre (36 ha) cemetery located in Murfreesboro, Tennessee. The cemetery began as a slave cemetery until its owner Dr. James Maney (the owner of Oaklands Plantation), deeded a 20-acre (8.1 ha) portion of his land to the city of Murfreesboro in 1872 to replace the "Old City Cemetery" which is located near downtown Murfreesboro. The cemetery is the final burial place for many notable people from Tennessee and the grounds are home to centuries old maple, oak and magnolia trees. Some of the trees pre-date the cemetery and a number of the headstones are more than 140 years old.

Evergreen Cemetery is governed by a 34-member board of directors and its current chair is John Rucker Jr. who has served on the board for over 24 years.

It is located at 519 Greenland Drive. Tours of the cemetery, presented by Oaklands Mansion, are also held each year.

== Confederate Circle ==
Flag and memorials in the center of Confederate Circle in winter.

The Confederate Circle, a mass gravesite, was established in 1890. In 1891, remains of Confederate soldiers were gathered from burial locations across the area, including the "Old Confederate Cemetery" located about 1.5 miles (2.4 km) south of Murfreesboro, and reinterred here. Some 2,000 – about 90% unnamed – soldiers, are buried in the Circle. The perimeter of the Circle is marked by stone posts bearing the names of each of the Confederate States. Individual burial markers for some of the known dead are located near the corresponding state posts.

The Circle is the site of several observances and memorials throughout the year for local Sons of Confederate Veterans Camps, including Camps #33 and #1355.

== Notable burials ==
- John P. Buchanan (1847–1930), Governor of Tennessee 1891–93
- David W. Dickinson (1808–1845), U.S. Representative
- Harold Earthman (1900–1987), U.S. Representative
- Marvin Leroy Maple (1936–2016), kidnapper of his grandchildren
- Mary Noailles Murfree (1850–1922), author
- Joseph B. Palmer (1825–1890), Confederate General
- Charles Ready (1802–1878), U.S. Representative
- James D. Richardson (1843–1914), U.S. Representative
- Ken Shipp (1928–2012), College and NFL coach
