= Isaac H. Hilliard =

American planter and cotton factor

- Born: Isaac Henry Hilliard Jr. 1811; Halifax County, North Carolina, U.S.
- Died: June 25, 1868 (aged 56–57)
- Education: University of Nashville
- Occupation: Planter
- Spouses: Lavinia Leinian; Miriam Brannin
- Children: Isaac H. Hilliard III; Edwin S. Hilliard
- Parent: Lavinia Hilliard
- Relatives: Hardy Murfree (grandfather)

Isaac H. Hilliard (1811–1868) was an American planter and cotton factor in the Antebellum South. He was an advocate of the Confederate States of America. During the American Civil War of 1861–1865, he moved his family slaves to Texas and later Louisiana. After the war, he was pardoned by President Andrew Johnson and liquidated his cotton-factoring business. His Arkansas plantation was inherited by his sons.

== Early life ==
Isaac H. Hilliard was born in 1811 in Halifax County, North Carolina. He grew up in North Carolina and Virginia.

His grandfather, Hardy Murfree, is the namesake of Murfreesboro, Tennessee. His brother-in-law was George W. Polk, a relative of President James K. Polk and the owner of Rattle and Snap, a plantation in Columbia, Tennessee.

He graduated from the University of Nashville in 1832.

== Career ==
Hilliard inherited land in southern Chicot County, Arkansas from his grandfather, Hardy Murfree. In 1844, he moved to Chicot County to establish a plantation near Grand Lake, Arkansas, which he co-owned with his brother-in-law George W. Polk. They hired an overseer from Kentucky, James H. Garrett. As of 1850, they owned 550 acres of land and 151 African slaves as well as "three horses, twenty-four mules, thirteen dairy cattle, thirteen oxen, seventy-five other cattle, and a hundred head of swine." By 1860, he owned 1,939 acres of land.

He was a Partner of Hilliard, Summers and Company, a cotton-factoring firm based in New Orleans, Louisiana, where he spent much of his time.

Hilliard was a staunch advocate of the Confederate States of America and the institution of slavery. On January 14, 1861, he wrote a letter to The Chicot Press stating he was a candidate to represent Chicot County at the secessionist convention, and he was elected. He voted in favor of the Confederate States Constitution.

During the American Civil War of 1861–1865, he moved to Texas, where he took his brother-in-law's African slaves, and later Louisiana. He was pardoned by President Andrew Johnson on September 19, 1865.

In 1866, he liquidated the firm of Hilliard, Summers & Co.

== Personal life ==
He was married twice. His first wife was Lavinia Leinian. They had a daughter, named after her mother, born in 1837. His first wife died in childbirth.

In 1847, he married a second time, to Miriam Brannin of New Castle, Kentucky. They had two sons: Isaac Henry Hilliard III and Edwin Summers Hilliard. Miriam, who kept a diary, spoke French fluently and attended balls, for example in Jackson, Mississippi in 1850. Plagued by neuralgia, she took morphine to get better, but died in 1853.

== Death and legacy ==
He died on June 25, 1868. His plantation was inherited by his eldest son, Isaac H. Hilliard III, who married his cousin, Carolina Polk, in 1880. His younger son, Edwin S. Hilliard, purchased the plantation from his brother's widow in 1895.
