= Mary Scales =

American activist (1928–2013)

Mary C. Scales
- Born: September 24, 1928; Columbus, Georgia
- Died: October 6, 2013 (aged 85); Murfreesboro, Tennessee
- Resting place: Evergreen Cemetery
- Education: B.S. Tennessee State University; Master's MTSU
- Occupation: Educator
- Employer(s): Murfreesboro City Schools; MTSU; Tennessee Department of Education
- Organization(s): Murfreesboro City School Board; Murfreesboro City Council
- Spouse: Robert W. Scales
- Children: Madelyn Scales Harris

Mary Caruthers Scales (September 24, 1928 – October 6, 2013) was a professor, civic leader, and funeral home owner. She was the first black faculty member at Middle Tennessee State University where she taught in the College of Education, and became associate dean there. Prior to this she had been a school teacher at Bradley and Bellwood schools. She was later elected to the Murfreesboro City School Board, and to the Murfreesboro City Council as the first African-American female councilperson.^{[subscription]} Scales Elementary School in Murfreesboro, Tennessee is named in honor of her and her husband, Robert W. Scales. Her husband, Robert W. Scales was the first African-American elected to the Murfreesboro City Council and first African-American Vice-Mayor of the city.

== Life and career ==
Mary Scales was born in Columbus, Georgia, and raised in Chicago, Illinois.

Mary Scales attended Knoxville College, received her bachelor's degree from Tennessee State University, and her Master's from Middle Tennessee State University.

Mary Scales began her career as a school teacher, and supervisor of instruction in middle school math at Bradley & Boxwood middle schools. She then worked in the Murfreesboro City Schools Administration before being hired at MTSU's education department as an associate professor then full professor as the first black faculty member at MTSU. She would later go on to become association dean of continuing education, and a math specialist with the Tennessee Department of Education.

Mary Scales a founding member of the Pi Nu Omega and served as advisor to Eta Psi chapter of Alpha Kappa Alpha at Middle Tennessee State University. She was married to Robert "T-90" Scales, owner of the Scales & Sons Funeral Home and the first black city councilperson and vice-mayor of Murfreesboro, Tennessee. She was later herself elected to the Murfreesboro City School Board, and Murfreesboro City Council as the first black woman ever elected. After the passing of Robert "T-Niny" Scales she took over ownership of the Scales & Sons Funeral Home from 2000 to 2012.

Her daughter, Madelyn Scales Harris, was elected to the Murfreesboro City Council in 2010.
