= Robert W. Scales =

American politician (1926–2000)

Robert Winston Scales "T-90" ("Tee-Niny")
- Born: June 22, 1926; Murfreesboro, Tennessee, U.S.
- Died: October 30, 2000 (aged 74); Murfreesboro, Tennessee, U.S.
- Education: Tennessee State University (B.A.)
- Occupations: Civic leader, politician, small business owner
- Known for: First African-American elected to the Murfreesboro City Council and first African-American Vice-Mayor of Murfreesboro
- Spouse: Mary Scales (m. 1949–2000)
- Children: Madelyn Scales Harris
- Parent: Henry Preston Scales Willie Burkeen Scales
- Awards: Joint resolution of the 102nd Tennessee Legislature

Robert Winston "T-90" ("Tee-Niny") Scales, born June 22, 1926, died October 30, 2000, was an American civic leader, politician, and small business owner in Murfreesboro, Tennessee. Scales was the first African-American elected to the City Council of Murfreesboro, and first African-American Vice-Mayor of that municipality. He was husband of Mary Scales, the first black faculty member at Middle Tennessee State University and similarly pioneering member of the City Council and City School Board of Murfreesboro, and father of Madelyn Scales Harris, who was elected to the same City Council in 2010.

== Life and career ==
Robert Winston Scales was born to Henry Preston and Willie Burkeen Scales on June 22, 1926. The couple owned and managed the Scales & Son Funeral Home; founded by Preston Scales in 1916, the business was the first black-owned funeral home in Murfreesboro and in Rutherford County, Tennessee. Robert Scales graduated from Holloway High School, in Murfreesboro.

Scales enrolled at Tennessee State University, received his bachelor's degree from that institution, and went on to work in the family business, Scales & Son Funeral Home, eventually owning and running the business. In addition to managing the small business, Scales went on to serve as the first African-American elected to the Murfreesboro City Council (serving 21 years), and as the first African-American Vice-Mayor of the city (serving 8 of those years).

In 1949, Scales married his wife Mary, a teacher who would become the first black faculty member at Middle Tennessee State University, and later the first African-American woman elected to the City School Board and City Council in Murfreesboro.

Following his death on October 30, 2000, Robert Winston "Tee-Niny" Scales was honored by a joint resolution of 102nd Session of the houses of the Tennessee legislature. His daughter, Madelyn Scales Harris, was elected to the Murfreesboro City Council in 2010.
