= Marvin L. Maple =

American man who kidnapped his grandchildren

Marvin Leroy Maple
- Born: January 14, 1936; Byer, Ohio, U.S.
- Died: May 26, 2016 (aged 80); Murfreesboro, Tennessee, U.S.
- Resting place: Evergreen Cemetery (Murfreesboro, Tennessee)
- Other name: John Bunting
- Occupations: Tool and die engineer, automobile salesman
- Employer(s): Chrysler, General Electric, Rutherford Tool & Die, Inc. (Owner), Avco Aero-Structures
- Known for: Allegedly kidnapping grandchildren
- Spouse: Sandra Gail Kuykendall (died April 27, 2005)
- Children: 3: Sherry, Debra, and Patricia
- Parent(s): Harold Emerson Maple (1909–1968); Mary Louise Manring (1916–1998)
- Motive: Protecting children from suspected abuse by parents
- Conviction: Custodial interference
- Criminal charges: Kidnapping
- Penalty: 4 years' probation
- Time at large: 20 years

Details
- Date apprehended: February 2009

Marvin Leroy Maple (January 14, 1936 – May 26, 2016) was an American grandfather arrested at age 73 for kidnapping two of his grandchildren more than 20 years earlier.

After losing a custody dispute with the children's natural parents in 1989, Maple and his wife moved from their home in Murfreesboro, Tennessee, taking their 7-year-old grandson and 8-year-old granddaughter with them. They all changed their names and started a new life together in San Jose, California. The grandparents eventually put the two children through college.

By the time authorities located Maple in 2009, the grandson was 27 years old. The granddaughter was 28 years old and still living with her grandfather. At that point, neither of the children, then adults, wanted to reconnect with their natural parents. The grandmother had died two years earlier.

Maple was extradited to face charges in Tennessee, where he was placed on four years' probation. He died in 2016 at age 80.

== Family history ==
Maple had three children, all girls. His eldest daughter Debbie married Mark Baskin, a Southern Baptist, who was studying to be a minister. They had three children, Christi, Bobby, and Michael. In 1987, the grandparents offered to take care of the two older children, until the parents and youngest child got settled in Louisville, Kentucky, where Mark would attend the Southern Baptist Theological Seminary.

=== Accusations of abuse ===
Several months later, when the Baskins wanted to resume care of their children, the grandparents objected, accusing the Baskins of abusing them. Authorities started an investigation, and the Maples were awarded temporary custody of the two children on May 5, 1988. Karen Hornsby was appointed as attorney ad litem to represent the children during the investigation. However, the authorities found no evidence of abuse during their investigation, and the parents were expected to regain custody of their children.

=== Gone ===
Name changes
Family member	Original name	New name
Grandfather	Marvin Leroy Maple	John Bunting
Grandmother	Sandra Gail Kuykendall Maple	Frances Bunting
Granddaughter	Katharine Christine Baskin (Christi)	Jennifer Bunting
Grandson	Robert Maple Baskin (Bobby)	Jonathan Bunting

While the matter was still in litigation, the Maples quietly sold their house and left town with their grandchildren. A final hearing was scheduled March 29, 1989; however, when Hornsby went to check on the children on March 10, she found the home up for sale, and the family gone. An arrest warrant was issued, and sheriff's detectives and private investigators searched for 20 years, checking records, questioning family members, and requesting help from the National Center for Missing & Exploited Children.

=== Search ===
The missing family was the subject of episode 47 of Unsolved Mysteries on February 7, 1990.

A San Diego newspaper published a story about the missing family in January 2009, after being contacted by Tennessee cold case detective Bill Sharp, who began working on the case a year earlier. Because of numerous earlier sightings in California, investigators had long suspected the family was still in California.

== Discovery ==
The whereabouts of the Maples and their grandchildren remained a mystery until February 2009, when they were discovered alive and well in San Jose.

== Breaking the silence ==
In May 2017, after eight years of silence following being found, the grandson, now only answering to Jon Bunting, publicly spoke out in defense of his grandparents, stating that, "They sacrificed everything so we could have normal lives." When asked about the chances of a reunion with his biological parents, Jon said there was "absolutely none," and elaborated that "There's nothing that could come from it that would be good. It would just probably throw me back into trauma. I don't want to put myself through that. I have nothing to gain from it."
