= Hardy Murfree =

American soldier (1752–1809)

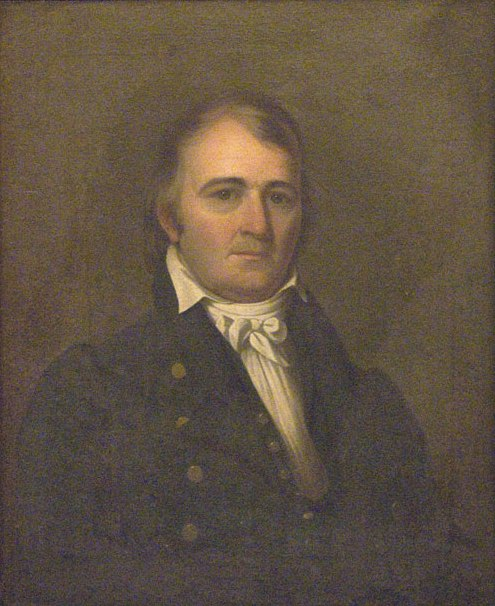
- Murfree, c. late 1700s
- Born: June 5, 1752; Murfree's Landing, Province of North Carolina, British America
- Died: April 6, 1809 (aged 56); Williamson County, Tennessee, U.S.
- Spouse: Sally Brickell (m. 1780; died 1802)
- Children: 6, including William Hardy Murfree
- Relatives: Isaac H. Hilliard (grandson); Mary Noailles Murfree (great-granddaughter)

Hardy Murfree (June 5, 1752 – April 6, 1809) was an American soldier who served as a lieutenant colonel in the Continental Army during the American Revolutionary War. He is the namesake of Murfreesboro, Tennessee.

== Early life ==
Murfree was born on June 5, 1752, at Murfree's Landing, in the British colony of North Carolina, later renamed Murfreesboro. His parents were William Murfree and Mary Moore.

== Military career ==
Murfree, a lieutenant in the Hertford County militia when the Revolutionary War began, was commissioned on September 1, 1775, as a captain in the 2nd North Carolina Regiment of the Continental Army. The regiment was commanded by Colonel Robert Howe, who was later a major general. Murfree saw action at the Battle of Monmouth on June 28, 1778, and achieved his greatest renown for leading a successful diversionary attack against British defenses in the Battle of Stony Point on July 15, 1779. He was then a major serving under General Anthony Wayne, and was soon thereafter promoted to lieutenant colonel.

On July 17, 1781, British forces led by Banastre Tarleton and the British Legion attacked Maney's Neck on the Meherrin River near Murfree's Landing. Murfree led the militia that repulsed the attack at Skinner's Bridge.

Around 1807, Murfree migrated to Williamson County, Tennessee, living on land granted to him after the American Revolution. In 1808 he placed a runaway slave ad seeking the return of Toby whom he thought would he toward South Carolina. Murfree remained in Williamson County until his death in 1809.

Murfree was a member of the North Carolina chapter of the Society of the Cincinnati. He was a Freemason for all of his adult life, active in both North Carolina and Tennessee.

== Personal life ==
Murfree married Sally Brickell on February 17, 1780. They had seven children: William Hardy Murfree (1781), Fanny Noailles Murfree (1783), Mary Moore Murfree (1786), Matthias Brickell Murfree (1788), Sally Murfree (1793), Lavinia Bembury Murfree (1795–1881), and Martha Long Ann Coakley Murfree (1801). Their great-granddaughter was the noted Tennessee writer Mary Noailles Murfree (1850–1922). His wife Sally died on March 29, 1802.

== Death and legacy ==
Murfree died on April 6, 1809. In 1811 the Tennessee State Legislature renamed the town of Cannonsburgh to Murfreesborough (later shortened to Murfreesboro) in his honor.
