= National Healthcare =

American healthcare company

National HealthCare Corporation
- Type: Public
- Traded as: AMEX: NHC; Russell 2000 Component; S&P 600 Component
- Industry: Healthcare
- Founded: July 1971; 55 years ago
- Founder: Carl E. Adams
- Headquarters: Murfreesboro, Tennessee, United States
- Key people: Robert G. Adams (Chairman); Steve Flatt (President & CEO); Tim Shelly (Principal Operating Officer)
- Services: Skilled nursing, assisted living, memory care, independent living, homecare, hospice, behavioral health
- Revenue: ▲US$1.52 billion (2025)
- Net income: ▲US$120.0 million (2025)
- Total assets: ▲US$2.07 billion (Q3 2026)
- Number of employees: ~15,000
- Website: nhccare.com

National HealthCare Corporation is an American healthcare services provider. The company was founded in 1971 and is based in Murfreesboro, Tennessee. The services of the company include long-term diverse nursing and rehabilitative care to healthcare centers, facilities and hospitals in 11 states primarily in the southeastern United States. As of late 2026, NHC operates across 10 states, with a network comprising 80 skilled nursing centers, 26 assisted living and memory care communities, 9 independent living communities, 3 behavioral health hospitals, 34 homecare agencies, 30 hospice agencies, and 5 pharmacies.

== Background ==
The company offers its hospice services under the name of Caris Healthcare, which is the partially owned subsidiary of the company. NHC collaborated with Caris Healthcare to develop hospice services and deliver hospice services to over 1,000 patients in 28 locations every day. In 2013, the company completed the acquisition of six skilled health care centers from National Health Investors, Inc. The company has a market capitalization (As of December 2017) of $951.93 million with an enterprise value of $1.03 billion.

=== Acquisitions ===
In August 2024, NHC completed the $221.4 million acquisition of the Spartanburg, South Carolina-based White Oak Senior Living portfolio, marking the company's entry into North Carolina and expanding its South Carolina footprint. The transaction added 15 skilled nursing facilities (6 in North Carolina and 9 in South Carolina, including continuing care retirement communities and assisted/independent living units) totaling 1,928 skilled nursing beds, 48 assisted living units, and 302 independent living units, alongside a long-term care pharmacy.

In mid-2026, NHC further expanded its portfolio by acquiring 5 skilled nursing facilities (639 beds) in Tennessee and South Carolina in June 2026, followed by the July 2026 purchase of real estate for 32 skilled nursing facilities and 3 independent living facilities (4,825 licensed beds) across six states from National Health Investors.

== Operations ==
In October 2013, the company renewed its one year $75 million line of credit with Bank of America, which is the sixth amendment to their credit agreement with Bank of America.

Some of the network facilities that NHC operates are:

- Skilled Nursing Facilities: NHC operates based on several skilled nursing facilities that will provide various services, including but not limited to therapy, nutrition, social services, activities, housekeeping, and other medical services.
- Specialized Care Unit: these facilities will have memory care units for individuals diagnosed with Alzheimer’s or related disorders and some of the sub-acute nursing units that will be used for specialized care.
- Behavioral Health Services: these clinics will cater to both adult and geriatric patients for several conditions, such as psychiatric, emotional, and addictive disorders.
- Homecare and Hospice Agencies: NHC’s homecare will assist individuals with their medical needs and some of their daily activities at home or with anyone living in residencies. The services will usually be hospice and palliative care.
