= Joseph B. Palmer =

American politician

Joseph Benjamin Palmer
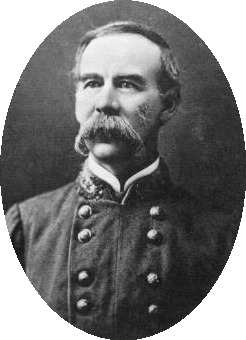
- Joseph Benjamin Palmer
- Born: November 1, 1825; Rutherford County, Tennessee
- Died: November 4, 1890 (aged 65); Murfreesboro, Tennessee
- Burial place: Evergreen Cemetery, Murfreesboro, Tennessee
- Military career
- Allegiance: Confederate States of America
- Branch: Confederate States Army
- Service years: 1861–65
- Rank: Brigadier General
- Conflicts: American Civil War

Joseph Benjamin Palmer (November 1, 1825 – November 4, 1890) was an American lawyer, legislator, and soldier. He served as a Confederate general in the American Civil War, during which he was wounded four times. After the conflict he resumed his law practice in Tennessee.

== Early life and career ==
Joseph B. Palmer was born in 1825 in Rutherford County, Tennessee. His first immigrant ancestor to America was the youngest son of a British member of Parliament named James Palmer (1585–1658), who moved to Virginia in the 1600s. After his parents' divorce, his father's move to Illinois, and his mother's death, Joseph was raised by his grandparents. Palmer received his education at the Union University, then located in Murfreesboro, Tennessee. He was admitted to the state bar association in 1848 and began practicing as a lawyer. In 1849 Palmer was elected to the Tennessee General Assembly, and in 1851 he was re-elected. In 1855 he was then elected as mayor of Murfreesboro, serving until 1859.

== Civil War service ==
At the beginning of the American Civil War in 1861, Palmer chose to follow his home state and the Confederate cause. He organized a company of soldiers and in May was elected a captain in the 18th Tennessee Infantry, into which this company was added. That June he was elected colonel, assuming command of the regiment.

Palmer fought primarily in the Western Theater of the American Civil War. He was part of the garrison surrendered at Fort Donelson on February 15, 1862, and was exchanged on August 15. That October Palmer was given brigade command in the Army of Mississippi. He fought in the Battle of Stones River and was wounded in his right shoulder and his right leg on January 2, 1863. Palmer fought during the Battle of Chickamauga that fall, and was wounded on September 19 when he again hit in his right shoulder.

Temporarily unfit for active field service, Palmer was appointed to district command in the Department of Tennessee beginning on November 18, 1863. He resumed brigade command on June 27 in the Army of Tennessee, and then participated in the Atlanta campaign. Palmer fought during the Battle of Jonesborough, and was wounded on the third day of the fight on September 1, 1864. He was promoted to the rank of brigadier general on November 15.

Franklin-Nashville Campaign map

Palmer fought in the 1864 Franklin-Nashville Campaign, participating in the Battle of Columbia in late November 1864 and the Battle of Franklin on November 30 (only a few days later), in the Battle of Nashville on December 15–16, and was part of the army's rearguard during the retreat following Nashville. What remained of the Tennessee regiments of the Army of Tennessee were consolidated, were placed under Palmer's command, and he led them during the 1865 Carolinas campaign.

On March 19, 1865, Palmer fought during the Battle of Bentonville and was again wounded, but remained in brigade command until April 26. He surrendered with Gen. Joseph E. Johnston on May 1 and was paroled from Greensboro, North Carolina. Palmer was pardoned by the U.S. Government on October 26, and again on May 21, 1866.

== Postbellum career ==
Following the war, Palmer returned home and resumed his law practice. Despite several requests to run for governor of Tennessee he chose to avoid public service. Palmer died in 1890 at his home in Murfreesboro, Tennessee, and his body was buried in the city's Evergreen Cemetery.

== See also ==
- List of American Civil War generals (Confederate)
