= Discovery Center at Murfree Spring =

Children's museum in Murfreesboro, Tennessee, United States

Coordinates: 35°50′19.0″N 86°23′13.0″W

Discovery Center
- Interactive map of Discovery Center
- Type: Children's museum, Nature center
- Location: 502 S.E. Broad Street; Murfreesboro, Tennessee, USA
- Area: 20 acres (8.1 ha)
- Created: 2002
- Website: explorethedc.org

The Discovery Center is a children's museum, nature center and wetlands boardwalk near downtown Murfreesboro, Tennessee. Exhibits include themed exploration areas for town life, science, trains, cars, a fire engine and farmers market. There are live animals on display, an outdoor nature play area, and trails through the wetlands.

== History ==
The Discovery Center began as the "Discovery House", a children's museum, in 1986. During its first year of operation it had 11,000 visitors.

In 1995 after it outgrew its old location the Discovery House staff, Congressman Bart Gordon and Murfreesboro Mayor Joe Jackson, with the help of the United States Army Corps of Engineers, began to study the possibility of reusing the vacated site of the old Murfreesboro Water & Sewer Plant. After several years it was decided that, for environmental reasons, the old structures should be demolished and new buildings built.

In 1996 the City of Murfreesboro leased 6.5 acres (2.6 ha) of city land to the Discovery House. The Board of Directors, with the help of local citizens, was able to procure a large amount of privately donated wetlands. They then began a grassroots funding campaign to raise the money needed for the 'Discovery Center". By 1999 $1.8 million had been raised and the construction of the 18,000 sq ft (1,700 m^{2}) center began in 2001. Its grand opening was held August 3, 2002.

As well as its museum the Discovery Center includes 20 acres (81,000 m^{2}) of wetland. The Discovery Center and the City's Greenway trail system and parks have reversed decades of local environmental damage and preserved large areas of vanishing wetlands and natural areas which include rare native plants. The Discovery Center marsh contains the state's largest population of sessile water-speedwell.

In 2014, the Center received over 130,000 visitors annually.
