= First Presbyterian Church (Murfreesboro, Tennessee) =

Historic church in Tennessee, United States

- U.S. National Register of Historic Places
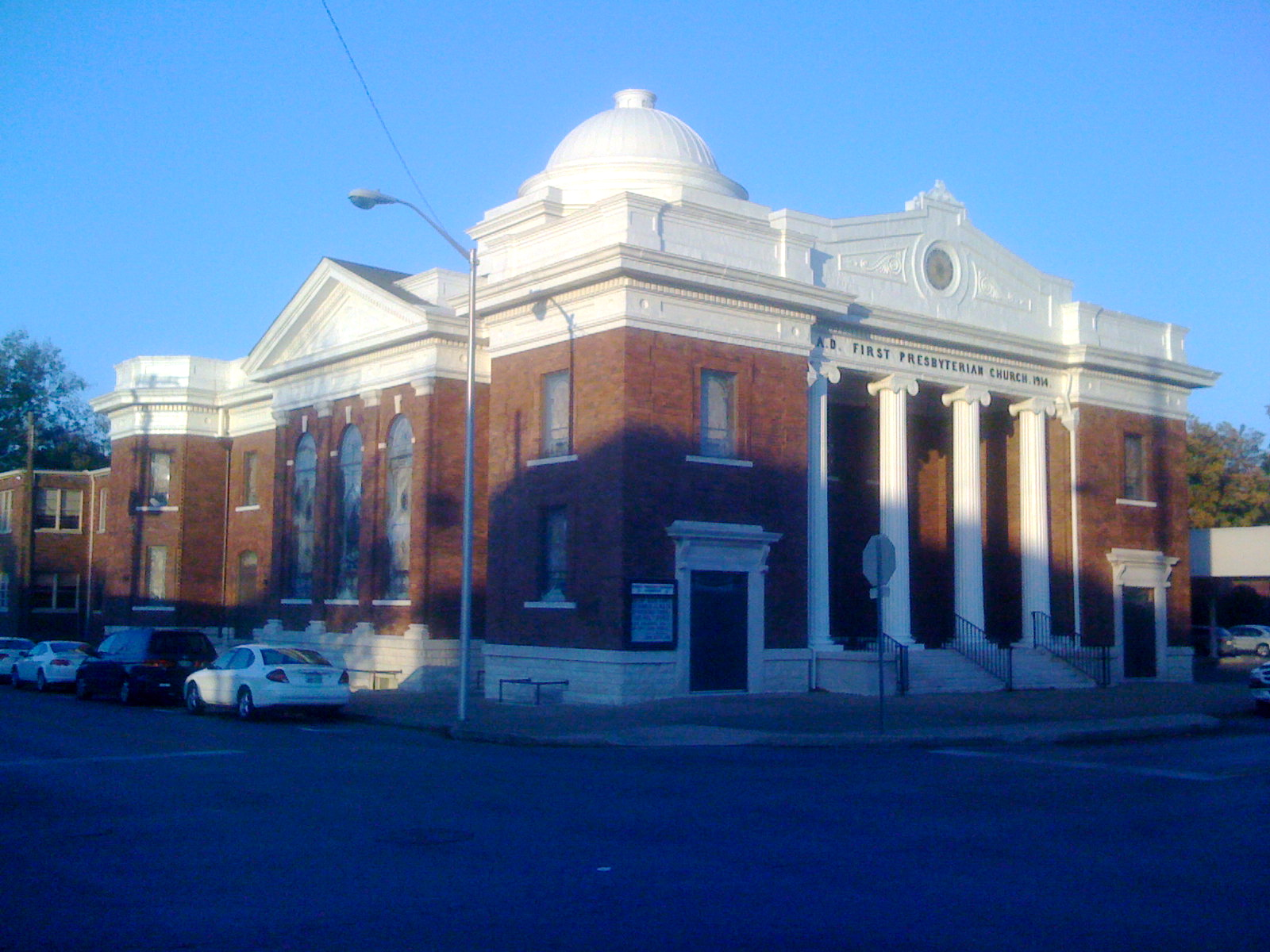

- Location within Tennessee Location within the United States
- Location: 210 N. Spring St., Murfreesboro, Tennessee
- Coordinates: 35°50′49.43″N 86°23′23.17″W
- Area: less than one acre
- Built: 1914
- Built by: Maugans & Bell
- Architect: D. Anderson Dickey
- Architectural style: Classical Revival
- NRHP reference No.: 93000561
- Added to NRHP: June 24, 1993

Murfree Springs Presbyterian Church was founded in 1812 in a log cabin. In 1818 it changed its name to First Presbyterian Church and in 1820 moved to a brick meeting house on East Vine Street. First Presbyterian Church currently is a historic church at 210 N. Spring Street in Murfreesboro, Tennessee.

Murfreesboro was the capital of Tennessee from 1818 to 1826. In 1822, the Rutherford County courthouse, where the legislature met, burned. The legislature then met at the First Presbyterian Church, the largest building in town, with the House meeting in the lower floor and the Senate in the expanded gallery. Present during those legislative sessions where Andrew Jackson, Sam Houston, James K. Polk and Davy Crockett. Andrew Jackson was nominated by the state legislature to be President of the United States in 1825.

The Union occupation of Murfreesboro during the Civil War saw the church building used as a hospital, for storage, billeting and as a stable. In 1864, the Union forces tore down the church to use the bricks at Fortress Rosecrans.

The scars of the war experience caused the church to relocate three blocks away to its present location at College and Spring Streets. A German gothic-style structure was erected in 1867. A tornado tore through downtown Murfreesboro in April, 1913, doing considerable damage to the Sanctuary, thus a new building, this time in the classic revival style with a dome, was built on the old foundation in 1914. The building was added to the National Register of Historic Places with a recorded completion date of 1914, corresponding to the post-tornado reconstruction. The new building was designed by Nashville architect D. Anderson Dickey and built by local contractors Maugans & Bell. A new education building was added in 1955, and a third section with a large “common room” with classrooms were finished in 1997. It is currently under the Presbyterian Church (USA).
