= Jeff Givens =

- Occupation: Tennessee Walking Horse trainer
- Discipline: Model/In-hand
- Born: 1961 or 1962
- Died: October 6, 2013; Gallatin County, Kentucky
- Major wins/Championships: 3 World Championships

Significant horses
- Trigger Treat, Maxximize

Jeff Givens (1961/1962 – October 6, 2013) was a Tennessee Walking Horse trainer who won three World Championships with the same horse. Givens died in a truck and trailer crash in 2013, at age 51.

== Career ==
Givens was a lifelong resident of Rutherford County, Tennessee, and operated Jeff Givens Stables in Murfreesboro, Tennessee. He was on the board of the Walking Horse Trainers' Association. In 2011, Givens and the horse Maxximize unanimously won the Model Pleasure Stallions class in the Tennessee Walking Horse National Celebration. Givens showed Trigger Treat in the Model Pleasure Geldings class the same day and also won. Givens and Trigger Treat went on to win three World Championships in the model division. In 2013, Givens and Trigger Treat made an appearance and meet and greet at the Tennessee Walking Horse National Museum. After Givens' death, the model class at the Columbia Spring Jubilee, an annual horse show in Columbia, Tennessee, was named the Jeff Givens Memorial in his honor. The year following his death, 2014, the Walking Horse Owners' Association (WHOA) dedicated their International Pleasure and Colt Grand Championship to Givens and two other horsemen, Robert Pollack and Sam Stockett.

== Personal life ==
Givens married Debbie Robinson. The couple had a son and daughter, Christopher and Kelsey.

== Death ==
On October 6, 2013, Givens was driving south on Interstate 71 through Gallatin County, Kentucky, pulling a horse trailer home from a horse show in Ohio. He was accompanied by Tim "Lightning" Taylor, a friend who was riding as a passenger. At approximately 8:30 am, the trailer Givens was towing jackknifed, hit a guard rail, and then flipped over; bad weather and rain were considered factors in the crash. Givens was pronounced dead at the scene; Taylor had a punctured lung and other injuries, but survived and was taken to a hospital. Of the six horses on board the trailer, three had to be euthanized on the scene because of the severity of their injuries. One of them was Maxximize; three other horses survived the crash. Givens was 51 years old.
