= Battle of Columbia =

Battle of the American Civil War

Coordinates: 35.6163°N 87.0488°W

- Part of the American Civil War
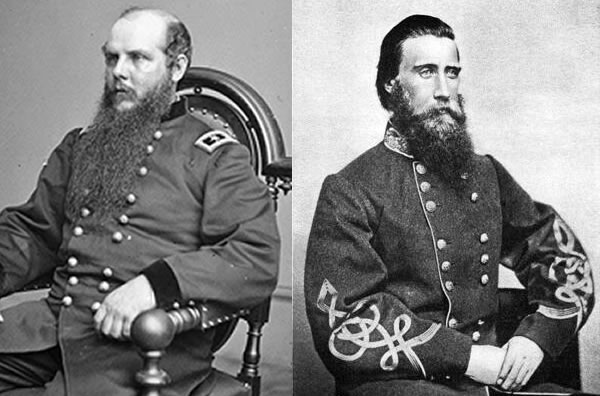
- Army commanders Schofield and Hood
Date	November 24, 1864 – November 29, 1864
Location	Maury County, Tennessee
Result	Confederate victory

Belligerents
United States (Union)	(Confederate States of America) CSA (Confederacy)

Commanders and leaders
John M. Schofield; James H. Wilson	John Bell Hood; Joseph B. Palmer

Units involved
XXIII Corps; IV Corps	Army of Tennessee

Strength
28,000	35,000

Casualties and losses
Unknown	Unknown

The Battle of Columbia was a series of military actions that took place November 24–29, 1864, in Maury County, Tennessee, as part of the Franklin-Nashville Campaign of the American Civil War. It concluded the movement of Lt. Gen. John Bell Hood's Confederate Army of Tennessee from the Tennessee River in northern Alabama to Columbia, Tennessee, and across the Duck River. A Union force under Maj. Gen. John M. Schofield skirmished with Hood's cavalry, commanded by Maj. Gen. Nathan Bedford Forrest, and fortified a defensive line south of Columbia, but soon withdrew north across the Duck River, abandoning the town. Hood's invasion of Tennessee continued as he attempted to intercept Schofield's retreating army at Spring Hill.

== Background ==
Following his defeat in the Atlanta campaign, Hood had hoped to lure Maj. Gen. William T. Sherman into battle by disrupting his supply lines from Chattanooga to Atlanta. After a brief period in which he pursued Hood, Sherman elected instead to conduct his March to the Sea from Atlanta to Savannah, Georgia. He left forces under the command of Maj. Gen. George H. Thomas, the commander of the Army of the Cumberland, to defend Tennessee and defeat Hood: principally the IV Corps from the Army of the Cumberland, commanded by Maj. Gen. David S. Stanley, and the XXIII Corps from the Army of the Ohio, commanded by Maj. Gen. John Schofield.

Hood moved through northern Alabama and his corps under Lt. Gen. Stephen D. Lee crossed the Tennessee River at Florence from October 30 to November 2, with the remainder of his army encamped south of the river at Tuscumbia. He waited there for almost three weeks while his commissary officers attempted to provide 20 days' supply of rations for the upcoming campaign. This was a difficult assignment because the supply line was tenuous, requiring transport on two railroads, followed by 15 miles on poor roads to Tuscumbia, using wagons pulled by undernourished horses and oxen. Hood also wanted to wait for the arrival of Nathan Bedford Forrest, who was engaged in a cavalry raid against Thomas's supply lines, highlighted by his victory at the Battle of Johnsonville on November 4–5.

During the first week of November, raids by the 2nd Michigan Cavalry under Brig. Gen. John T. Croxton damaged the pontoon bridge that Hood had erected across the Tennessee River. After repairs were effected, Hood transferred his headquarters to Florence on the morning of November 13 and Maj. Gen. Benjamin F. Cheatham's corps marched across the river that day with the army's supply trains and cattle following on November 14. The final corps, under Lt. Gen. Alexander P. Stewart, crossed the Tennessee on November 20.

On November 16, Hood received word that Sherman was about to depart Atlanta for his March to the Sea. There was no realistic possibility that Hood could return to Georgia from his current location to challenge Sherman's advance, so he focused his strategy on an alternative plan: move north into Tennessee, defeat Thomas's army before it could concentrate, seize the important manufacturing center of Nashville, and continue north into Kentucky, possibly as far as the Ohio River. From this point, he could travel east to Virginia to join up with Gen. Robert E. Lee at Petersburg. His theater commander, Gen. P.G.T. Beauregard, urged Hood to take immediate action in an attempt to distract Sherman's advance, emphasizing the importance of moving before Thomas could consolidate his forces.

Both Sherman and Thomas considered it likely that Hood would follow Sherman through Georgia. Although Thomas received intelligence that Hood was amassing supplies for a movement north, he discounted most of it—heavy rains during November made the roads almost impassable. As he received reports of Confederate movements 14 miles north of Florence, he was unsure what was going on. Schofield assumed it was merely a raid by Forrest's cavalry against the railroad between Pulaski and Columbia. By November 21, Thomas had evidence that all three of Hood's corps were in motion and he directed Schofield to withdraw gradually to the north to protect Columbia before Hood could seize it. Schofield arrived at Pulaski on the night of November 13 and assumed command of all forces there, including the IV Corps. Thomas remained concerned that 10,000 troops from the XVI Corps, commanded by Maj. Gen. Andrew J. Smith, had not arrived as promised reinforcements from Missouri.

== Movement to Columbia ==
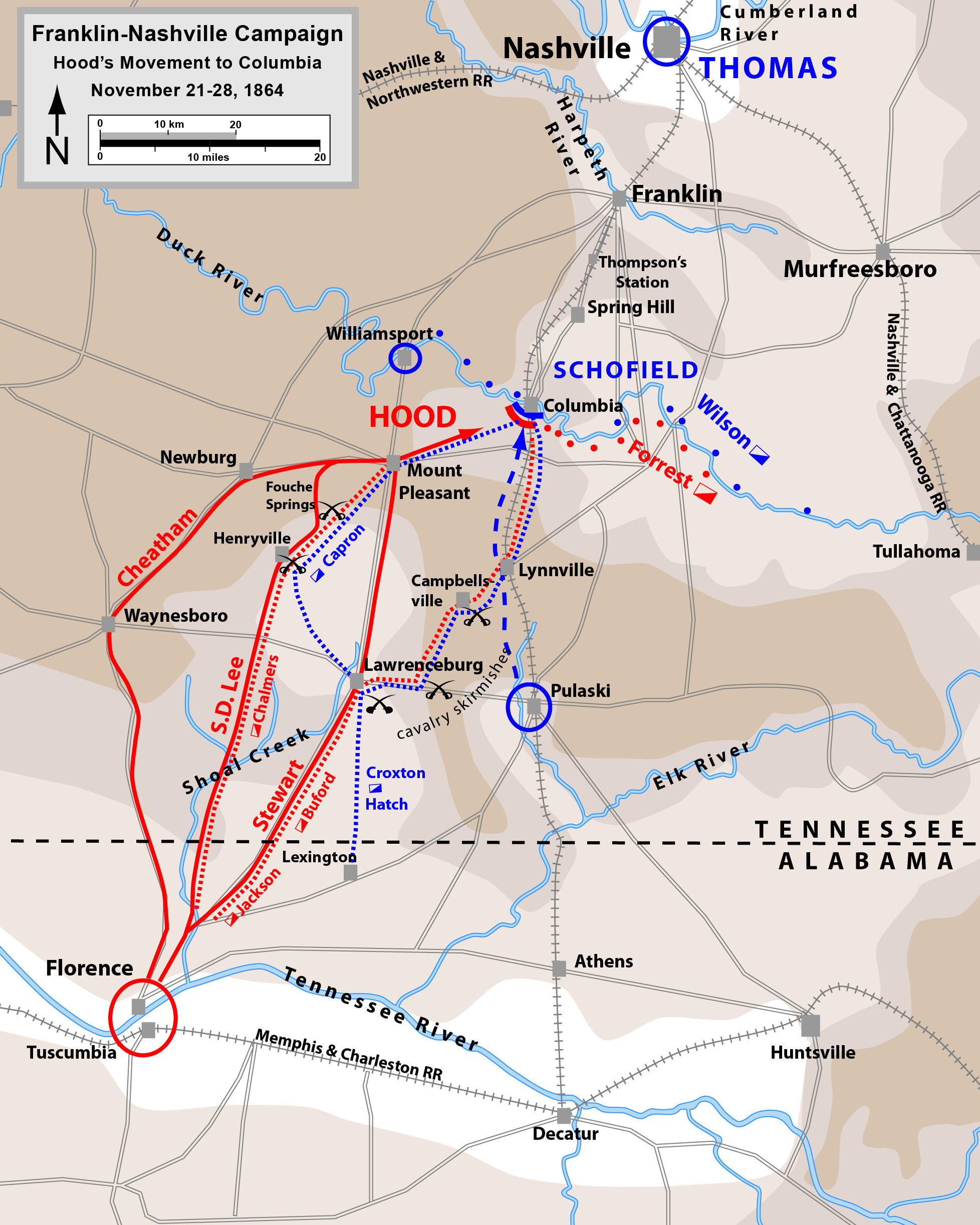
Hood's advance from Florence to Columbia Confederate Union

Hood's headquarters departed Florence at 10 a.m. on November 21, accompanied by Cheatham's corps toward Waynesboro, which they reached on November 23. The army marched in three columns, with Cheatham on the left, Lee in the center, and Stewart on the right, all screened by Forrest's cavalry. Hood's plan was to consolidate his army at Mount Pleasant and from there move to the east to cut off Schofield before he could reach Columbia and the Duck River. The rapid forced march 70 miles north was under miserable conditions, with freezing winds and sleet, which made progress difficult for the underfed and underclothed army. Nevertheless, Hood's men were in good spirits as they returned to Tennessee.

Because of Forrest's relentless screening, Schofield had no idea where the Confederate Army was headed. The aggressive Forrest had a considerable advantage over his Union cavalry opponents, commanded by Maj. Gen. James H. Wilson. Wilson had arrived from the Eastern Theater in late October to reorganize and command Thomas's cavalry, but he possessed only 4,300 horsemen, scattered around the theater in numerous small units, compared to 10,000 men unified under Forrest. The Confederate cavalry advanced to Mount Pleasant by November 23. Croxton's brigade was hopelessly outnumbered against Forrest, so Thomas reinforced him with a division under Brig. Gen. Edward Hatch and a brigade under Col. Horace Capron.

Forrest kept up the pressure and on November 23 heavy skirmishing occurred from Henryville to the outskirts of Mount Pleasant. At Fouche Springs (near present-day Summertown) that evening, the Confederate cavalrymen raided one of Capron's encampments, throwing them into chaos and capturing over 50 prisoners. Forrest came close to becoming a casualty as he mistakenly rode into a small group of Federals. One of his staff officers, Maj. John P. Strange, deflected the arm of a Union soldier who was aiming his pistol directly at Forrest's chest at close range and the bullet narrowly missed. The survivors from Capron's brigade fled toward Columbia. To the east, Forrest's divisions under Brig. Gens. Abraham Buford and William H. Jackson forced Hatch's division out of the Lawrenceburg area and drove them back toward Pulaski.

Early on November 24, Schofield began marching his two infantry corps north to Columbia. Forrest pursued aggressively with the division of Brig. Gen. James R. Chalmers, who occupied Mount Pleasant and hit Capron's men repeatedly as he forced them north. Capron's brigade was reduced from 1,200 to 800 men during the retreat to Columbia. Buford and Jackson drove Hatch north toward Lynnville and captured a number of prisoners, but the Confederate cavalry was unable to prevent the Northern infantry from reaching Columbia. The 5,000-man division of Brig. Gen. Jacob D. Cox reached Columbia only a few hours before Forrest's men could seize the river crossings and Stanley's corps completed a 30-mile march from Pulaski to reinforce him. Together, they began constructing an arc of trenches just south of the town.

== Columbia ==
On the morning of November 24, Forrest's cavalry drove Capron's men through Cox's line south of Columbia and began probing attacks in an attempt to break through. The line straddled the Mount Pleasant Pike (present day U.S. Route 43) just north of Bigby Creek and then continued eastward across the Pulaski Pike into the town, curving northward toward the river. By November 25, this line was supplemented with an interior line that roughly encompassed the entire residential area of Columbia. The Confederates bombarded the lines with artillery and a number of skirmishes occurred, but it became apparent to the Union defenders that only a single infantry division with some dismounted cavalry were participating in the attacks and that Hood was merely demonstrating, intending to cross the Duck River either upstream or downstream and cut off the Union force from Thomas, who was assembling the remainder of his force in Nashville.

On the morning of November 26, Schofield received an order from Thomas to hold the north bank of the Duck River until reinforcements under A. J. Smith could arrive from Nashville. Schofield planned to move his trains during the day and his infantry overnight, using a railroad bridge and a recently installed pontoon bridge, but heavy rains that day made approaches to the bridge impassable. That evening, the bulk of the Army of Tennessee reached the fortifications south of Columbia.

On November 28, Forrest crossed the river east of town against little resistance from the Union cavalry; the Southern cavalrymen had deceived Wilson and drawn his force to the northeast and away from the action. At the same time, Hood assigned the bulk of Lee's corps and almost all of his artillery to remain at Columbia and led Schofield to believe that he was planning a major attack against the town. Instead, he marched Cheatham's and Stewart's corps across the Duck River on a pontoon bridge assembled at Davis's Ford.

== Aftermath ==
No casualties were officially recorded at the "Battle of Columbia", which consisted primarily of demonstrations, artillery fire, and almost-unopposed maneuvers. Hood's army turned Schofield at Columbia and proceeded north toward Spring Hill in an attempt to isolate the Union force and destroy it.
