= Oaklands Historic House Museum =

Historic house in Tennessee, United States

- Oaklands Mansion
- U.S. National Register of Historic Places
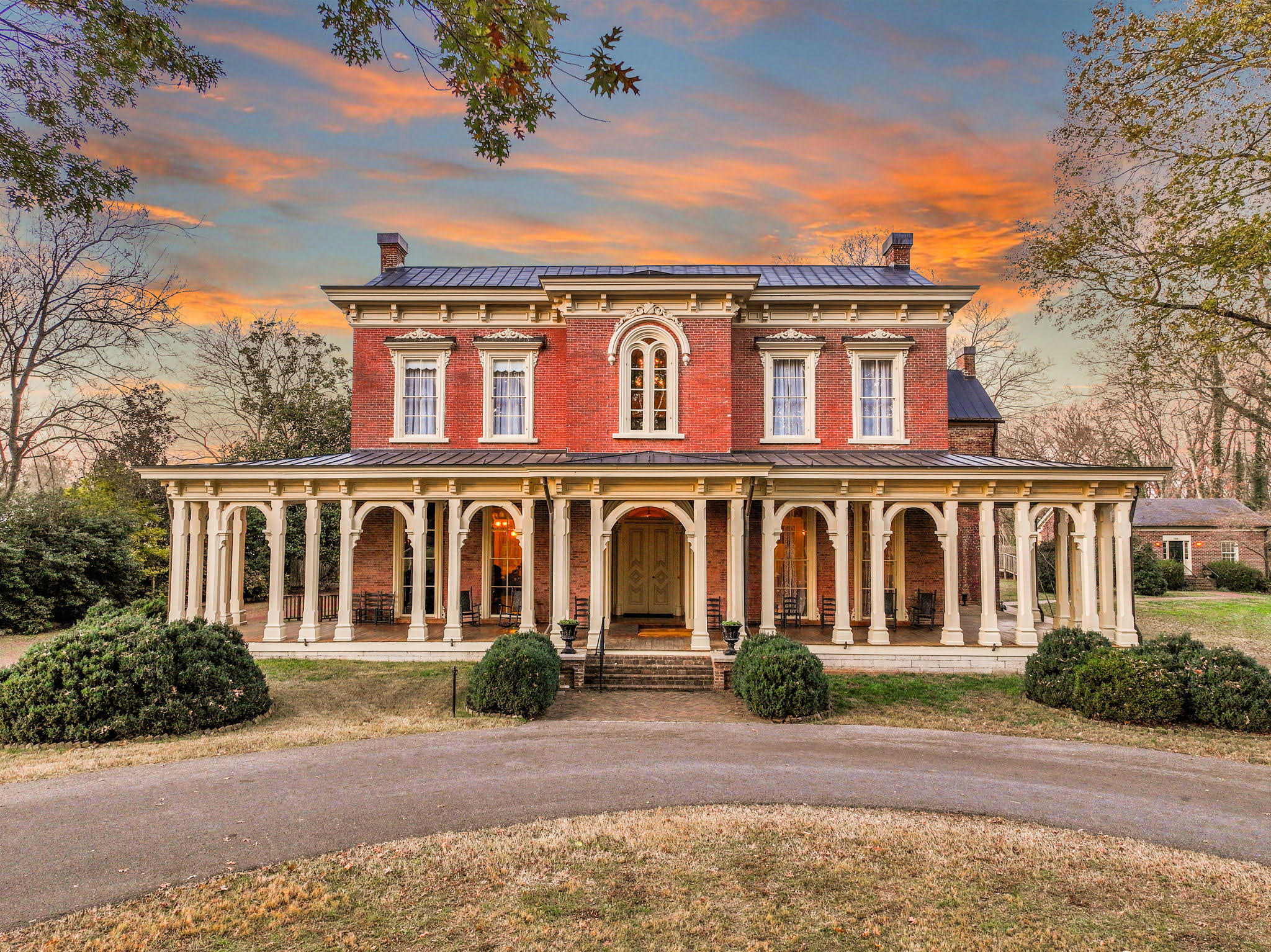

- Location within Tennessee Location within the United States
- Location: 900 N. Maney Ave., Murfreesboro, Tennessee
- Coordinates: 35°51′21″N 86°23′6″W
- Built: circa 1818–1858
- Architectural style: Italianate
- NRHP reference No.: 70000616
- Added to NRHP: February 26, 1970

Oaklands Mansion is an historic house museum located in Murfreesboro, Tennessee, United States. Oaklands is on the National Register of Historic Places and is a local landmark known for its unique Italianate design.

The plantation was caught in the middle of the Civil War and officers from both the Confederate and Union armies stayed in the mansion. The most notable visitor to the home was Confederate President Jefferson Davis, who stayed at Oaklands December 12–15, 1862 accompanied by his aid George Washington Custis Lee, son of Confederate General Robert Edward Lee. Other notable visitors were former United States First Lady Sarah Childress Polk, United States Senator from Tennessee and the 1860 Constitutional Union Party's nominee for President of the United States John Bell, Confederate General Braxton Bragg, Confederate Lieutenant-Genera Leonidas Polk, Confederate Naval Commander Matthew Fontaine Maury and Confederate Brigadier-General George Maney.

During the First Battle of Murfreesboro on July 13, 1862, Confederate cavalrymen under Nathan Bedford Forrest surprised and defeated Federal forces encamped on the front lawn of the Mansion, near the plantation's spring and at the Rutherford County Courthouse as part of a raid on Union-occupied Murfreesboro. It is said that Lewis and Adaline Maney's children watched the fighting from the window of the second-floor hallway. After the surrender was signed, both armies gathered for a meal of black-eyed peas and sweet potatoes.

Colonel William Ward Duffield of the 9th Michigan Infantry, was severely wounded and captured by the Confederates during the early part of the battle. He was taken into the house and nursed by the Maney family. At noon the same day he was made prisoner by Forrest, but, in his then helpless condition, he was released upon his parole and promised not to bear arms against the Confederate States until regularly exchanged. Mrs. Duffield was a guest in the Maney home while her husband recovered for several months. The Duffields and the Maneys became friends during the Colonel's recuperation. After the war, the Duffields presented the Maneys with a silver tea service in gratitude for their hospitality and care of the Colonel.

The last residential owner of Oaklands, Rebecca Jetton, moved out of the house in the 1950s when she could no longer maintain it. The abandoned mansion was vandalized and left in disrepair. The city of Murfreesboro acquired it in 1958 with the intention of tearing it down. However, the mansion was restored to its original grandeur by a group of women who rallied together to form the Oaklands Association. The home was opened to the public as a museum in the early 1960s and now receives thousands of visitors annually and is used for various public and private functions.

== See also ==
- First Battle of Murfreesboro
- Nathan Bedford Forrest
- William Ward Duffield
