= Mary Noailles Murfree =

American novelist (1850–1922)

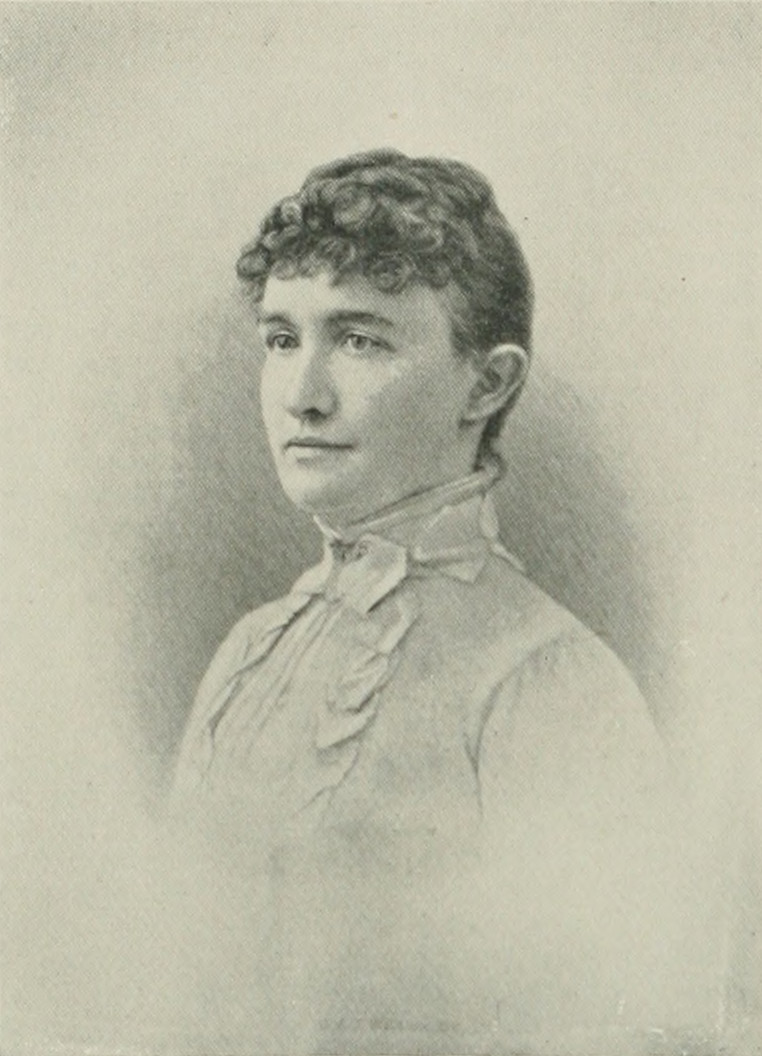
- "A Woman of the Century"
- Born: Mary Susan Murfree; January 24, 1850 near Murfreesboro, Tennessee, US
- Died: July 31, 1922 (aged 72); Murfreesboro, Tennessee, US
- Occupation: Writer
- Relatives: Colonel Hardy Murfree (grandfather)
- Writing career
- Pen name: Charles Egbert Craddock
- Period: 1884–1914
- Subject: Appalachian life

Mary Noailles Murfree (January 24, 1850 – July 31, 1922) was an American author of novels and short stories who wrote under the pen name Charles Egbert Craddock. She is considered by many to be Appalachia's first significant female writer and her work a necessity for the study of Appalachian literature, although a number of characters in her work reinforce negative stereotypes about the region. She has been favorably compared to Bret Harte and Sarah Orne Jewett, creating post-Civil War American local-color literature.

The town of Murfreesboro, Tennessee, is named after Murfree's great-grandfather Colonel Hardy Murfree, who fought in the Revolutionary War.

== Biography ==
Murfree was born on her family's cotton plantation, Grantland, near Murfreesboro, Tennessee, a location later celebrated in her novel, Where the Battle was Fought and in the town named after her great-grandfather, Colonel Hardy Murfree. Her father was a successful lawyer of Nashville, and her youth was spent in both Murfreesboro and Nashville. From 1867 to 1869 she attended the Chegary Institute, a finishing school in Philadelphia. Murfree would spend her summers in Beersheba Springs. For a number of years after the Civil War the Murfree family lived in St. Louis, returning in 1890 to Murfreesboro, where she lived until her death.

Being lame from childhood, Murfree turned to reading the novels of Walter Scott and George Eliot. For fifteen successive summers the family stayed in Beersheba Springs in the Cumberland Mountains of Tennessee, giving her the opportunity to study the mountains and mountain people more closely.

By the 1870s she had begun writing stories for Appleton's Journal under the penname of "Charles Egbert Craddock" and by 1878 she was contributing to the Atlantic Monthly. It was not until seven years later, in May 1885, that Murfree divulged that she was Charles Egbert Craddock to Thomas Bailey Aldrich, an editor at the Atlantic Monthly. Murfree visited the Montvale Springs resort near Knoxville, from 1886. Although she became known for the realism of her accounts, in fact she was from a wealthy family and would have had little contact with the local people while staying at the resorts.

== Works ==
=== Fiction ===
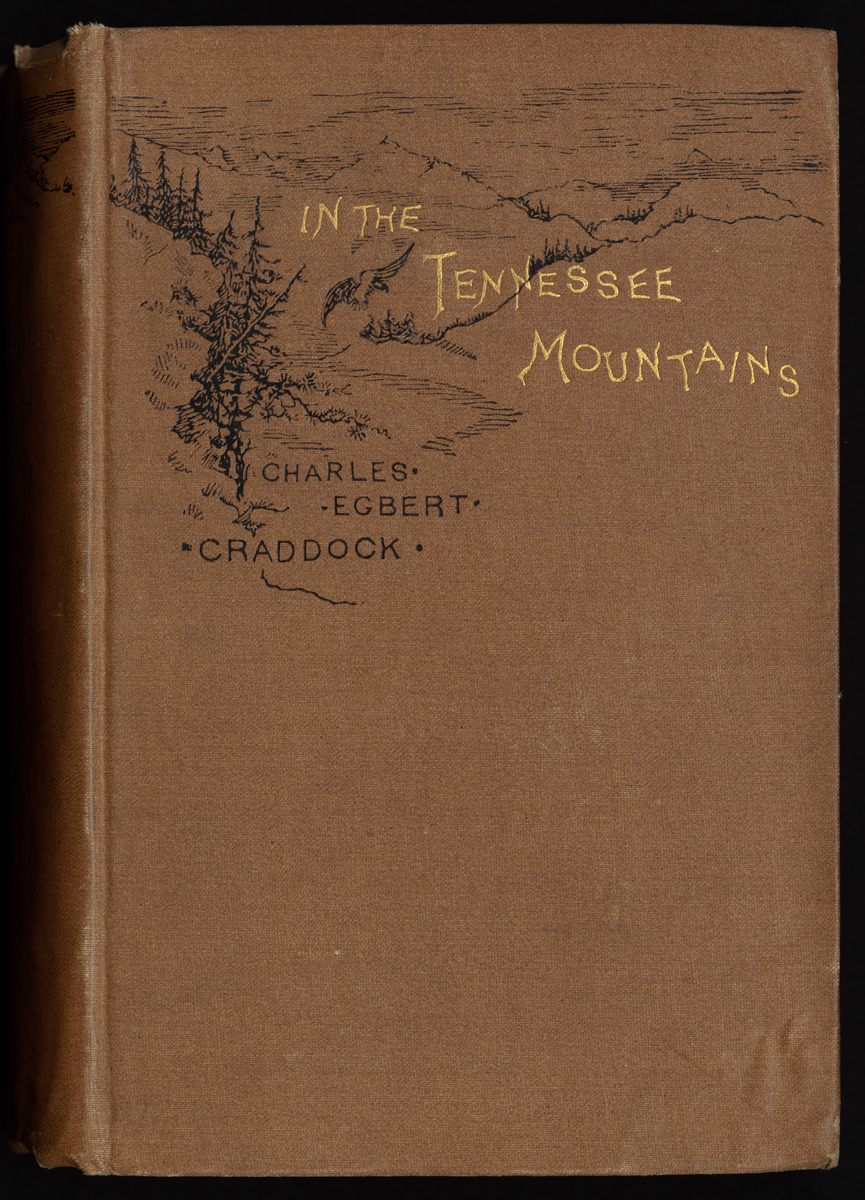
In the Tennessee Mountains, 1884

- In the Tennessee Mountains (1884) (eight stories on the life and character of the Tennessee mountaineer)(e-book at Documenting the American South)
- Where the Battle Was Fought (1884)
- Down the Ravine (1885)
- The Prophet of the Great Smoky Mountains (1885)(e-book at Documenting the American South)
- In the Clouds (1886)
- The Despot of Broomsedge Cove (1888)
- The Story of Keedon Bluffs (1887)
- In the "Stranger People's" Country (1891)
- His Vanished Star (1894)
- The Juggler (1897)
- The Story of Old Fort Loudon (1898)
- The Champion (1902)
- A Spectre of Power (1903)
- The Frontiersmen (1904) (e-book at Project Gutenberg)
- The Storm Centre (1905)
- The Amulet (1906)
- The Windfall (1907)
- The Fair Mississippian (1908)
- The Ordeal: A Mountain Romance of Tennessee (1912)
- The Story of Duciehurst: A Tale of the Mississippi (1914)

=== Short fiction ===
- The Phantoms of the Footbridge and Other Stories (1895)
- The Mystery of Witch-Face Mountain and Other Stories (1895)
- The Young Mountaineers (1897)
- The Bushwhackers and Other Stories (1899)
- Civil War Stories (contributor, 1900)
- The Raid of the Guerilla and Other Stories (1912)

== See also ==
- Literature of Tennessee
