= Boxwood (Murfreesboro, Tennessee) =

Historic house in Tennessee, United States

- U.S. National Register of Historic Places
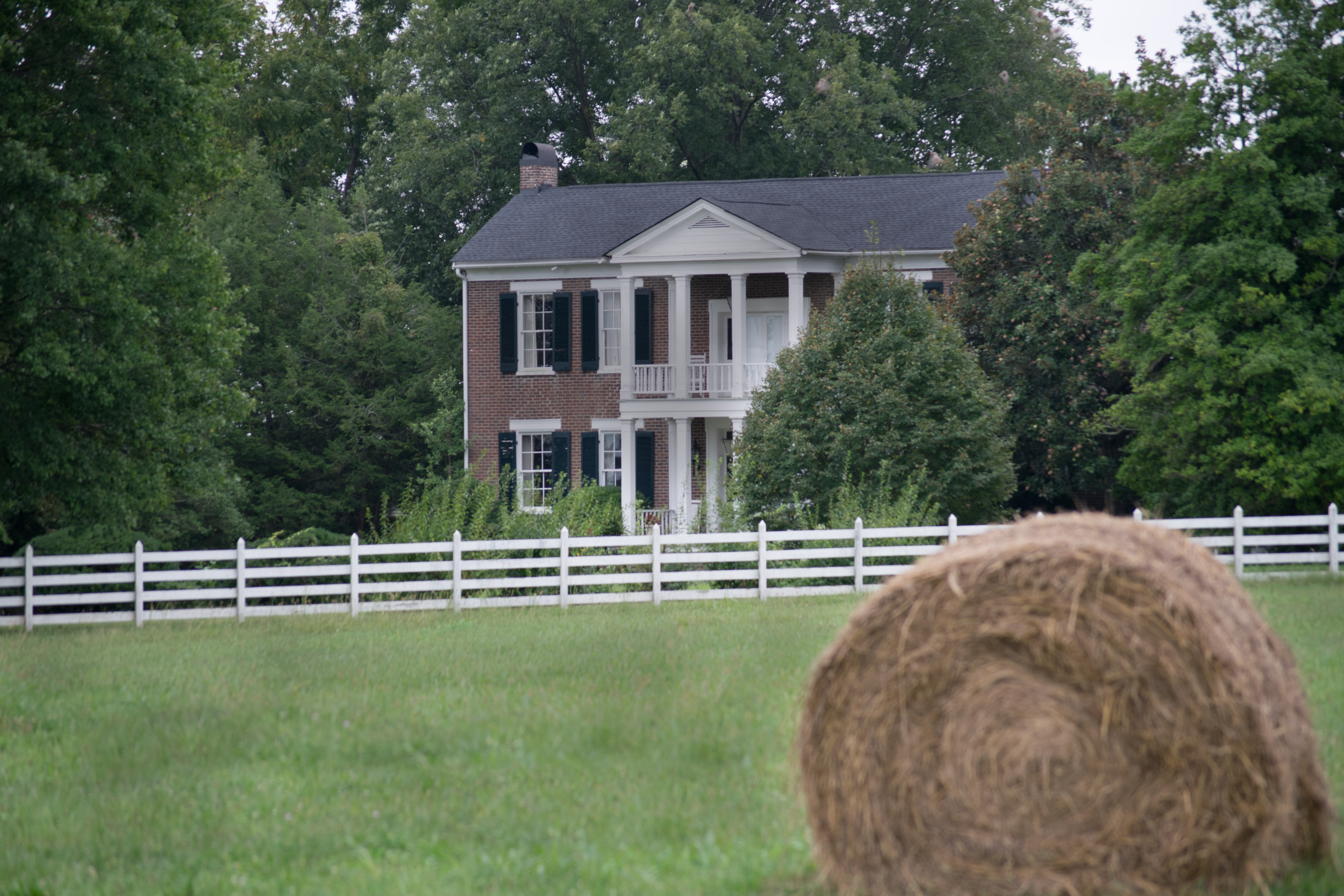
- The plantation house

- Location within Tennessee Location within the United States
- Nearest city: Murfreesboro, Tennessee
- Coordinates: 35°48′37″N 86°27′9″W
- Area: 1 acre (0.40 ha)
- Architectural style: Greek Revival, vernacular Greek Revival
- NRHP reference No.: 84000139
- Added to NRHP: October 25, 1984

Boxwood, also known as the Thomas J.B. Turner House, is an antebellum plantation house in southwestern Rutherford County, Tennessee, near Murfreesboro in the historic Salem community.

The house was built by Thomas J. B. Turner and his wife, Sarah Jetton Turner, and completed in 1843. It is a two-story brick house built on an I-house plan. Greek Revival architectural influences characteristic of antebellum architecture are evident in its design, which features a divided pedimented portico with square Doric columns and a balustrade. The name of the house derives from the boxwood plantings on the grounds, which are said to have originated with plants that Turner brought to Tennessee in a powder horn from North Carolina.

The Union Army occupied Boxwood during the Civil War. The home was saved from burning by Mrs. Turner playing the piano for Union troops in the front parlor of the home.

After an extensive renovation, Boxwood was listed on the National Register of Historic Places in 1984.

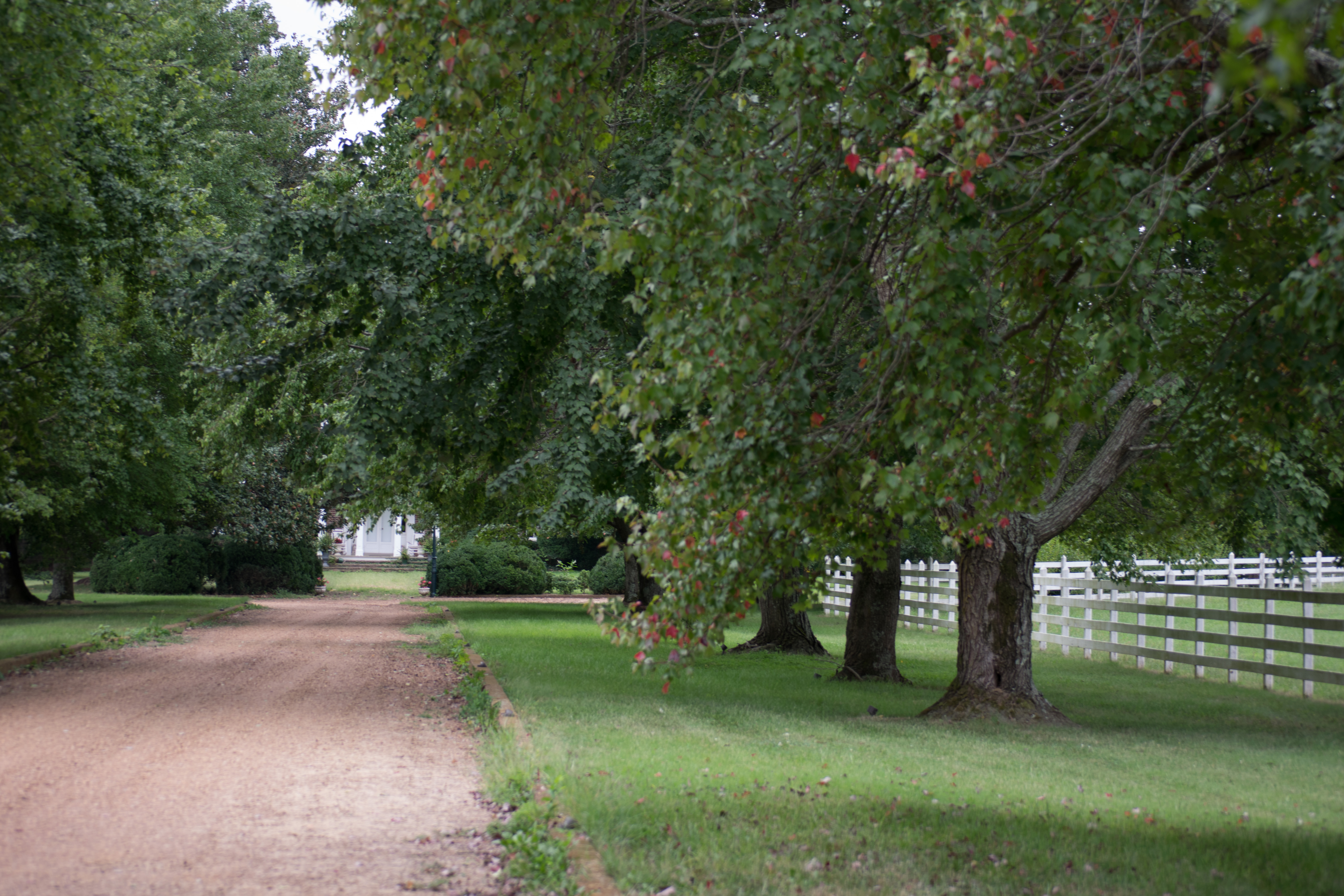
The main road into the plantation
