= Murfreesboro, Tennessee =

City in Tennessee, US

- City
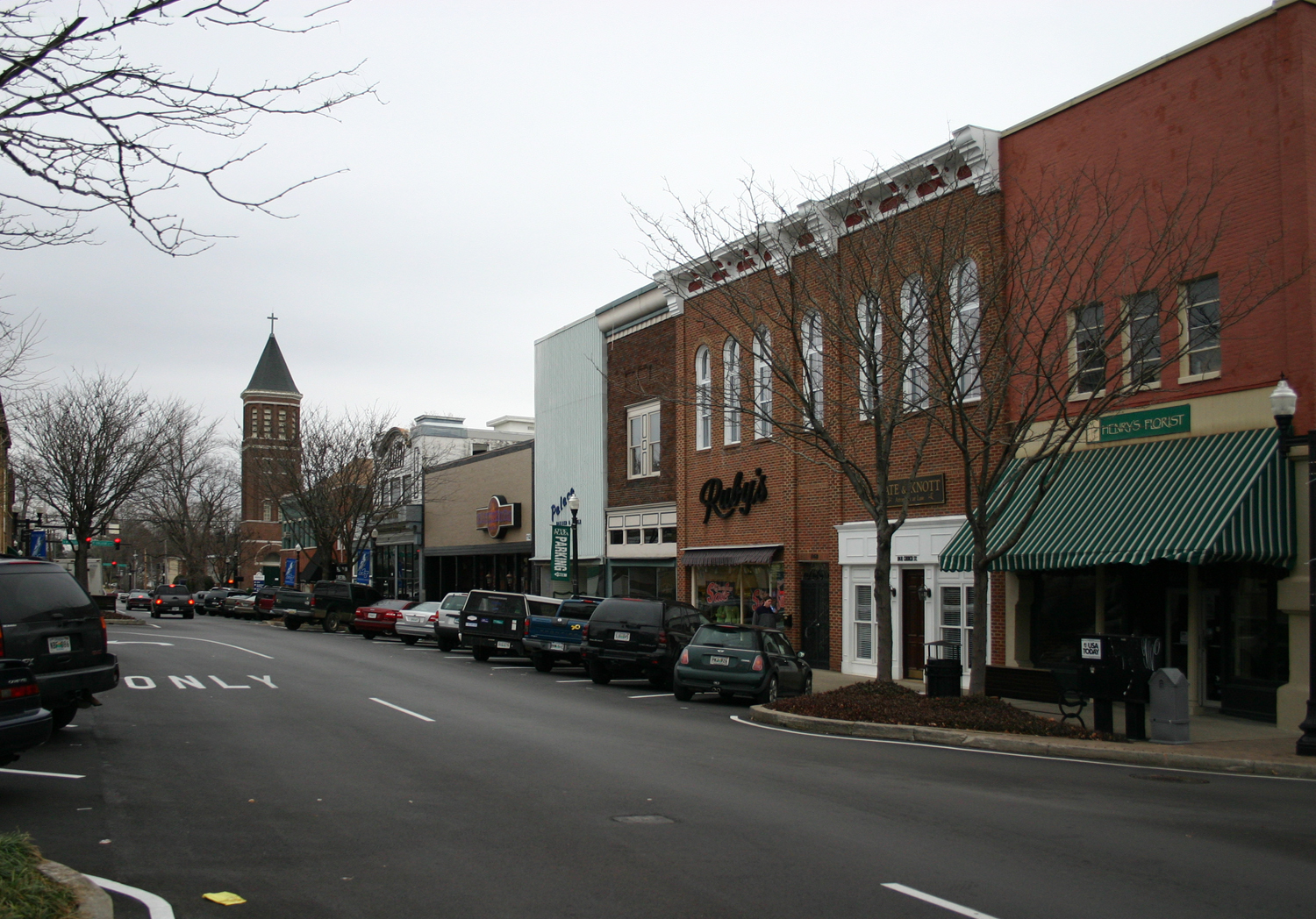
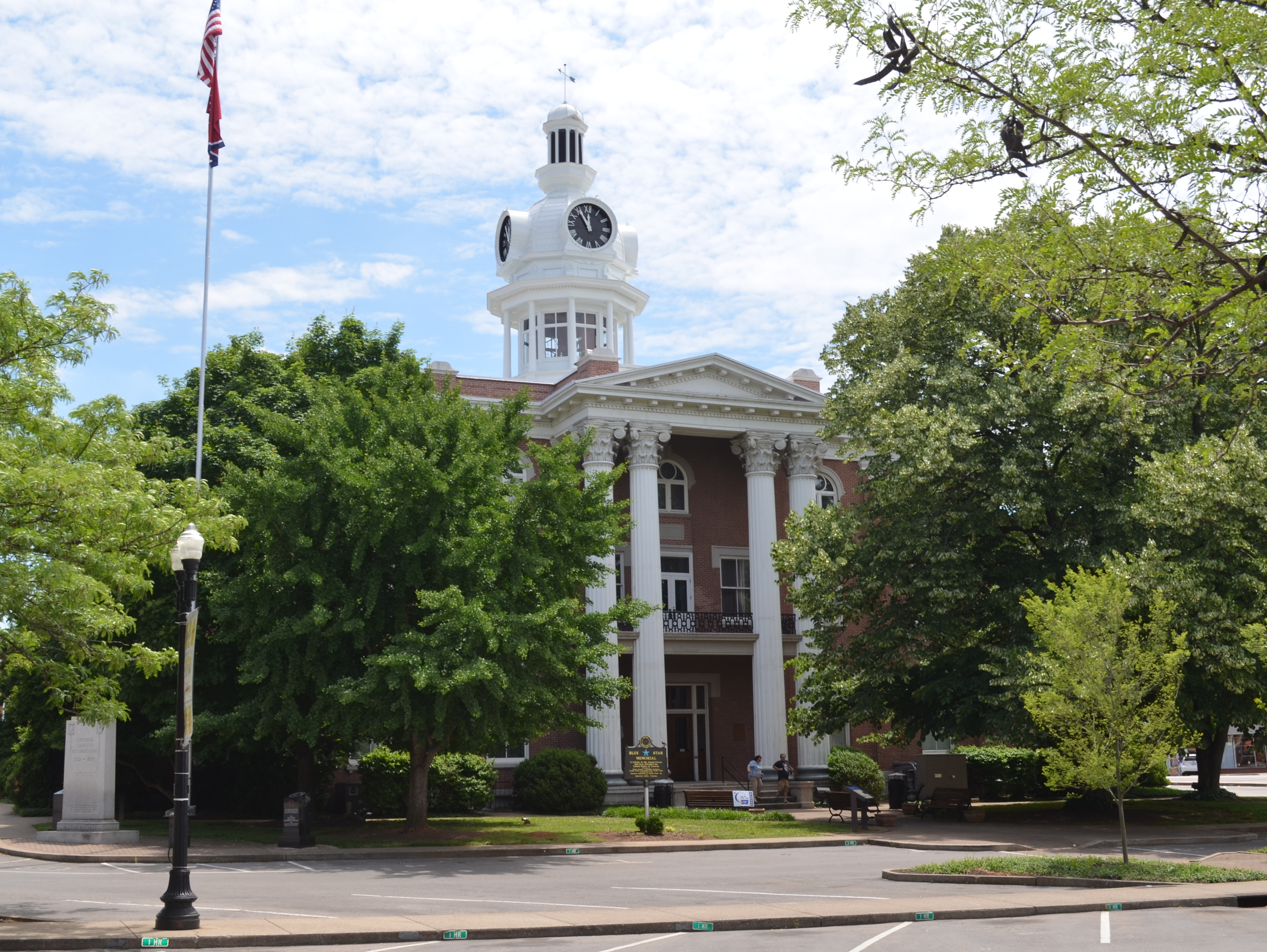
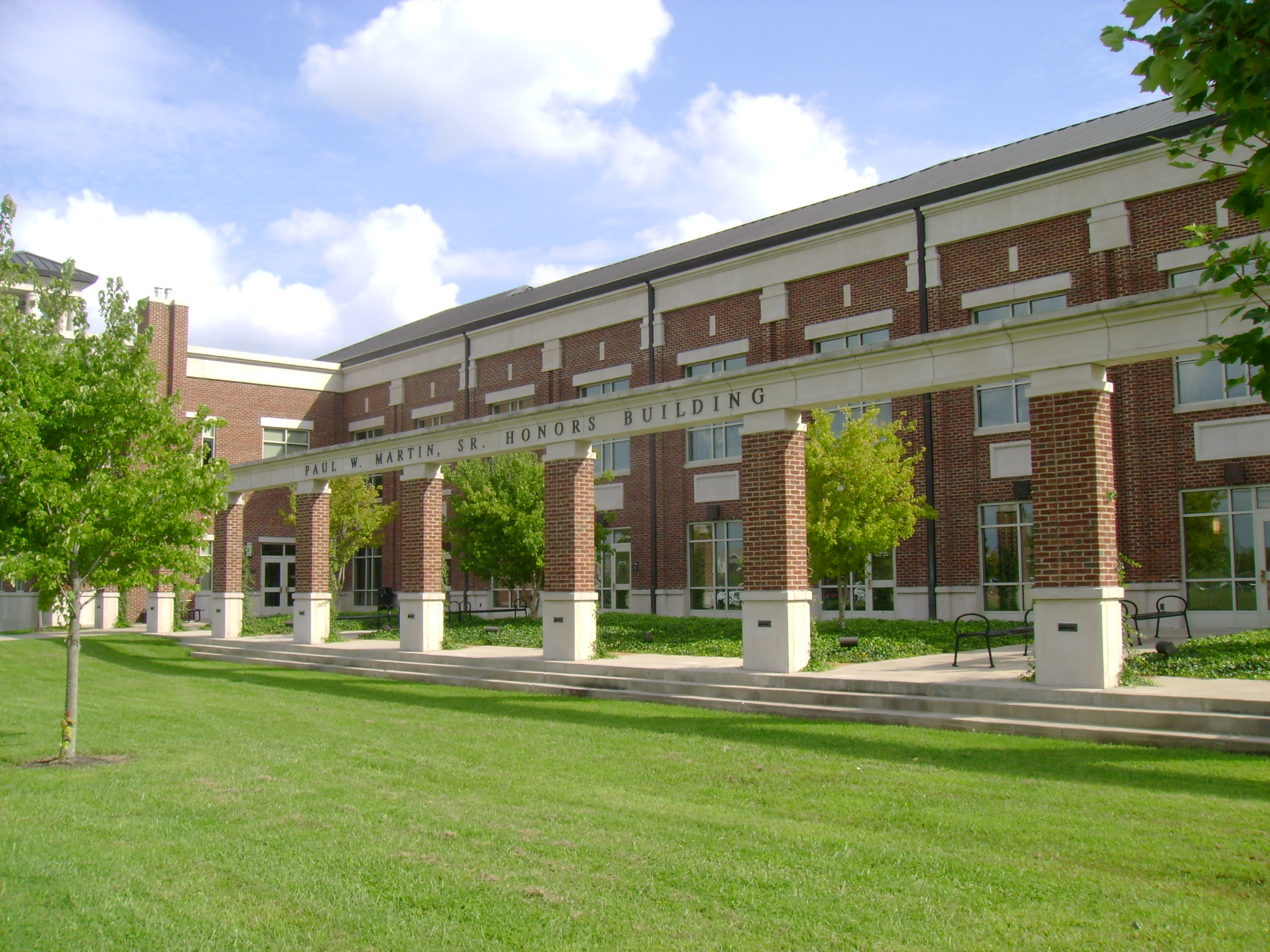
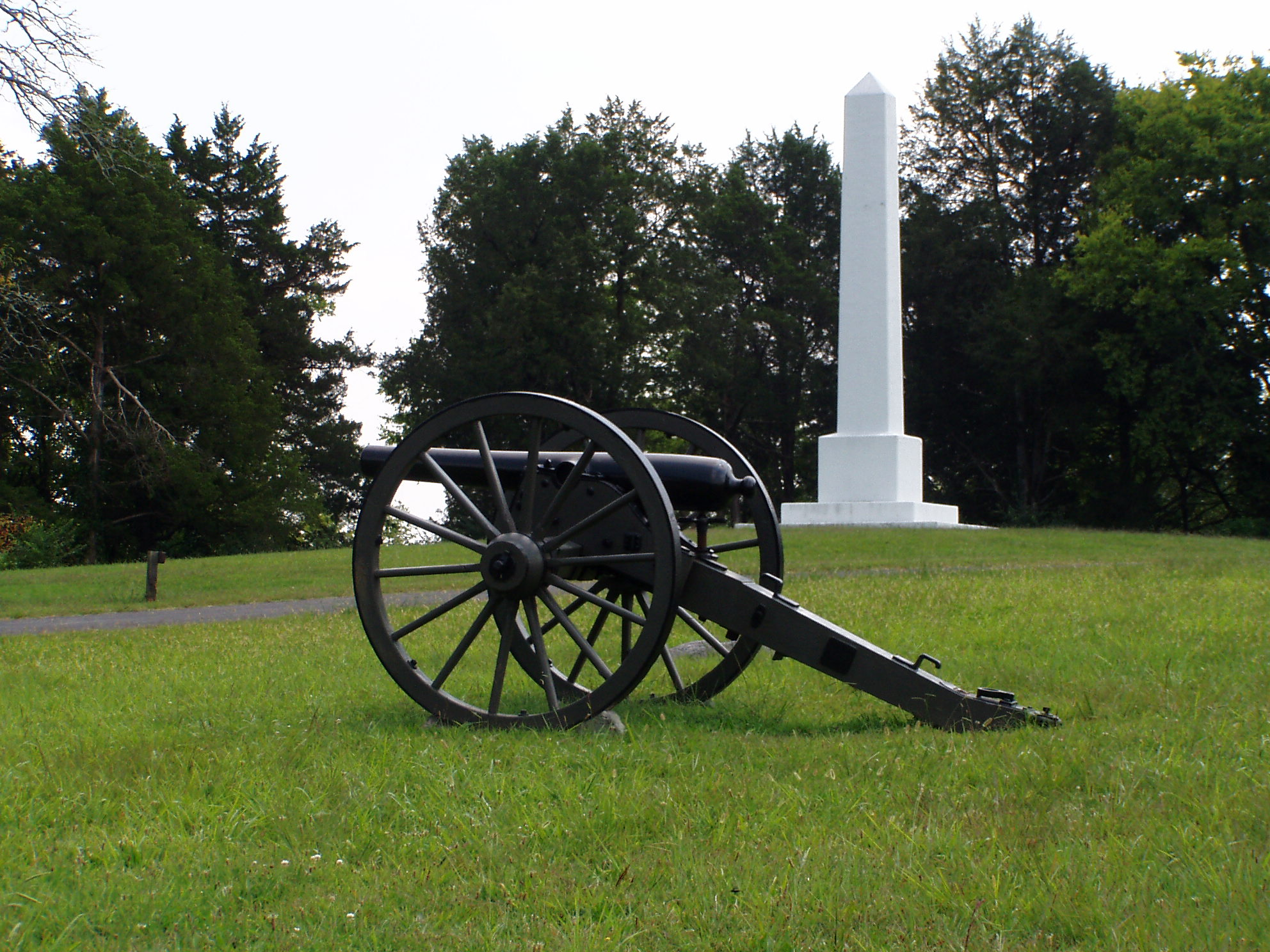
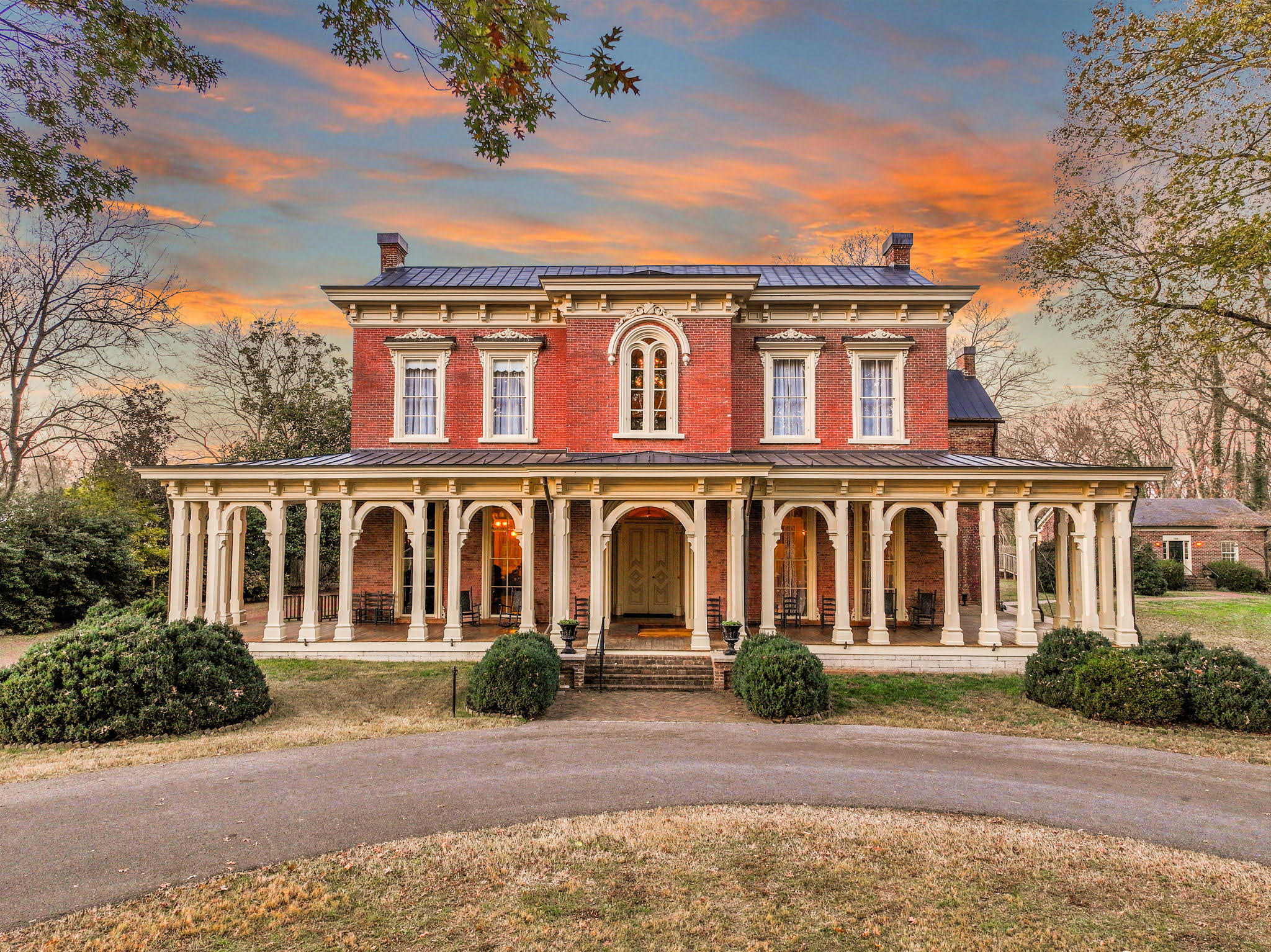
- Downtown Murfreesboro Rutherford County Courthouse Middle Tennessee State University Stones River National Battlefield Oaklands Mansion

- Flag Logo
- Nickname: The 'Boro
- Motto: "Creating a better quality of life."
- Location of Murfreesboro in Rutherford County, Tennessee

- Location within Tennessee Location within the United States
- Coordinates: 35°50′46″N 86°23′31″W
- Country: United States
- State: Tennessee
- County: Rutherford
- Settled: 1811
- Incorporated: 1817
- Named for: Hardy Murfree

Government
  - Type: Council–manager
  - Mayor: Shane McFarland (R)
  - Vice mayor: Bill Shacklett
  - City manager: Darren Gore

Area
  - City: 64.12 sq mi (166.08 km^{2})
  - Land: 63.99 sq mi (165.73 km^{2})
  - Water: 0.14 sq mi (0.35 km^{2}) 0.25%
- Elevation: 610 ft (186 m)

Population (2020)
  - City: 152,769
  - Estimate (2025): 173,625
  - Rank: US: 157th TN: 6th
  - Density: 2,387.4/sq mi (921.79/km^{2})
  - Urban: 350,000 (US: 241st)
- Time zone: UTC−6 (CST)
  - Summer (DST): UTC−5 (CDT)
- ZIP Codes: 37127-37133
- Area codes: 615, 629
- FIPS code: 47-51560
- GNIS feature ID: 1295105
- Website: www.murfreesborotn.gov

Murfreesboro is a city in Rutherford County, Tennessee, United States, and its county seat. The population was 152,769 at the 2020 census (estimated at 173,625 in 2025). Located 34 miles (55 km) southeast of downtown Nashville, it is part of the Nashville metropolitan area in Middle Tennessee.

Settled in 1811, Murfreesboro was the state capital of Tennessee from 1818 to 1826. Today, it is the largest suburb of Nashville and the sixth-most populous city in the state. The city is both the center of population and the geographic center of Tennessee. Since the 1990s, Murfreesboro has been Tennessee's fastest-growing major city and one of the fastest-growing cities in the country. Murfreesboro is home to Middle Tennessee State University, one of the largest undergraduate universities in the state.

== History ==
On October 27, 1811, the Tennessee General Assembly designated the location for a new county seat for Rutherford County, giving it the name Cannonsburgh in honor of Newton Cannon, representative to the assembly for the local area. At the suggestion of William Lytle, it was renamed Murfreesborough on November 29, 1811, after Revolutionary War hero Colonel Hardy Murfree, great-grandfather of author Mary Noailles Murfree. The name was shortened to Murfreesboro in January 1812, when the town was formally chartered.

As Tennessee settlement expanded to the west, the location of the state capital in Knoxville became inconvenient for much of the population. In 1818, Murfreesboro was designated as the capital of Tennessee and its population boomed. Eight years later, however, it was superseded by Nashville.

=== Civil War ===
On December 31, 1862, the Battle of Stones River, also called the Battle of Murfreesboro, was fought near the city between the Union Army of the Cumberland and the Confederate Army of Tennessee. This was a major engagement of the American Civil War, and between December 31 and January 2, 1863, the rival armies suffered a combined total of 23,515 casualties. It was the bloodiest battle of the war by percentage of casualties.

Following the Confederate retreat after the drawn Battle of Perryville in central Kentucky, the Confederate army moved through East Tennessee and turned northwest to defend Murfreesboro. General Braxton Bragg's veteran cavalry successfully harassed Union General William Rosecrans' troop movements, capturing and destroying many of his supply trains, but they could not completely prevent supplies and reinforcements from reaching Rosecrans. Despite the large number of casualties, the battle was inconclusive. It is usually considered a Union victory, since afterward, General Bragg retreated 36 miles (58 km) south to Tullahoma. Even so, the Union army did not move against Bragg until six months later, in June 1863. The battle was significant, since the Union gained a base from which it could push its eventual drive further south, which enabled its later advances against Chattanooga and Atlanta. The Union eventually divided the territory into the Eastern and Western theaters, followed by Sherman's March to the Sea through the South. The Stones River National Battlefield is now a national historical site.

General Rosecrans' move to the south depended on a secure source of provisions, and Murfreesboro was chosen for his supply depot. Soon after the battle, Brigadier General James St. Clair Morton, chief engineer of the Army of the Cumberland, was ordered to build Fortress Rosecrans, some 2 miles (3.2 km) northwest of the town. The fortifications covered about 225 acres (0.91 km^{2}) and were the largest built during the war. Fortress Rosecrans consisted of eight lunettes, four redoubts, and connecting fortifications. The fortress was built around the Nashville and Chattanooga Railroad and the West Fork of the Stones River; two roads provided additional access and transportation.

The fort's interior was a huge logistical resource center, including sawmills, warehouses, quartermaster maintenance depots, ammunition magazines, and living quarters for the 2,000 men who handled the operations and defended the post. After the fortress was completed in June 1863, Rosecrans ventured to the south. The fortress was never attacked, in part because the Union troops held the town of Murfreesboro hostage by training their artillery on the courthouse. Major portions of the earthworks still exist and have been incorporated into the battlefield historic site.

=== Post-Civil War ===
Murfreesboro was first developed as a mainly agricultural community, but by 1853, the area was home to several colleges and academies. Despite the wartime trauma, the town's growth had begun to recover by the early 1900s, in contrast to other areas of the devastated South.

In 1911, the state legislature created Middle Tennessee State Normal School, a two-year institute to train teachers. It soon merged with the Tennessee College for Women. In 1925, the normal school was expanded to a full, four-year curriculum and college. With additional expansion of programs and addition of graduate departments in 1965, it became Middle Tennessee State University. MTSU now has the largest undergraduate enrollment in the state, including many international students.

World War II was an impetus for industrial development, and Murfreesboro diversified into industry, manufacturing, and education. Growth has been steady since that time, creating a stable economy.

Since the last decade of the 20th century, Murfreesboro has enjoyed substantial residential and commercial growth, with its population increasing 123.9% between 1990 and 2010, from 44,922 to 108,755. The city has been a destination for many refugee immigrants who have left areas affected by warfare; since 1990, numerous people from Somalia and Kurds from Iraq have settled there. The city has also attracted numerous international students to the university.

==== Mosque controversy ====
Beginning in 2010, the Islamic Center of Murfreesboro faced protests related to its plan to build a new 12,000-square-foot (1,100 m^{2}) mosque. The county planning council had approved the project, but opposition grew in the aftermath, affected by this being a year of elections. Signs on the building site were vandalized, with the first saying "not welcome" sprayed across it and the second being cut in two. Construction equipment was also torched by arsonists.

In August 2011, a Rutherford County judge upheld his previous decision allowing the mosque to be built, noting the US constitutional right to religious freedom and the ICM's observance of needed process. The center has a permanent membership of around 250 families and a few hundred students from the university. The case ultimately attracted national media attention as an issue of religious freedom.

==== 2023 ordinance on homosexuality ====
In June 2023, the city passed an ordinance banning public homosexuality as indecent. In October 2023, the American Civil Liberties Union filed suit against the city, in response to the ban and, in December 2023, the ordinance was repealed.

== Geography ==
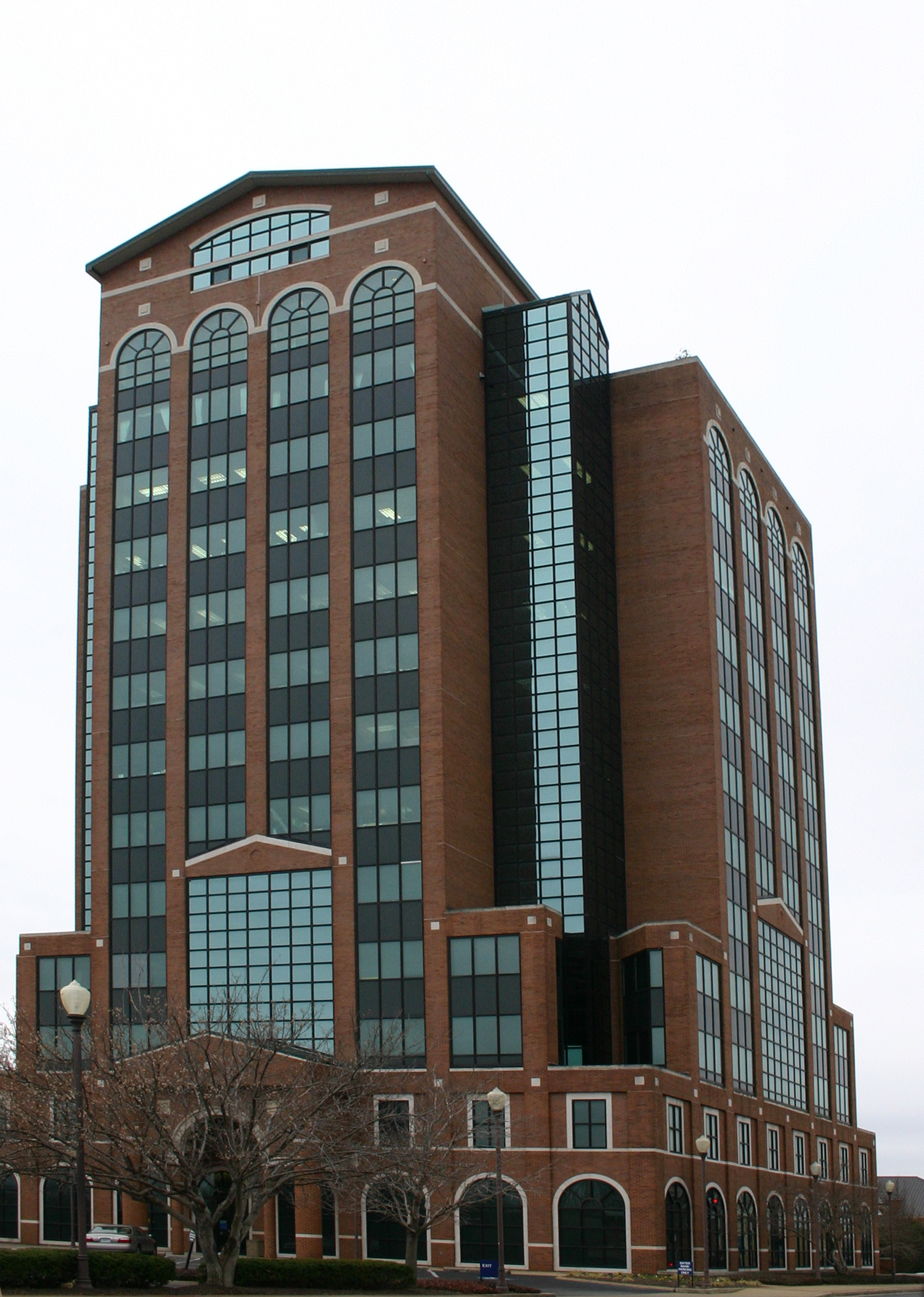
City Center was built by National HealthCare Corporation (NHC), led by CEO W. Andrew Adams, as its headquarters. Joe Swanson, a local industrial developer, initially owned two floors, and First City Bank leased three floors. The building is now solely owned by NHC.

According to the United States Census Bureau, the city has a total area of 39.2 square miles (102 km^{2}), of which 0.2 sq mi (0.52 km^{2}), or 0.54%, is covered by water. As of 2013, however, the city reported its total area as 55.94 square miles (144.9 km^{2}).

Murfreesboro is the geographic center of the state of Tennessee. A stone monument marks the official site on Old Lascassas Pike, about 0.5 miles (0.8 km) north of MTSU.

The West Fork of the Stones River flows through Murfreesboro. A walking trail, the Greenway, parallels the river for several miles. A smaller waterway, Lytle Creek, flows through downtown, including historic Cannonsburgh Village. Parts of the 19-mile-long (31 km) creek suffer from pollution due to the urban environment and its use as a storm-water runoff.

Murfreesboro is home to a number of natural and man-made lakes, plus several small wetlands, including Todd's Lake and the Murfree Spring wetland area.

Murfreesboro has been in the path of destructive tornadoes several times. On April 10, 2009, a low-end EF4 tornado with estimated wind speeds up to 170 miles per hour (270 km/h) struck the fringes of Murfreesboro. As a result, two people were killed and 41 others injured; 117 homes were totally destroyed, and 292 had major damage. The tornado is estimated to have caused over $40 million in damage.

=== Climate ===
Being in the Sun Belt, Murfreesboro's climate is humid subtropical (Cfa) under the Köppen system, with mild winters and hot, humid summers. Under the Trewartha system, it is an oceanic (Do) climate due to five months of winter chill (having monthly means below 50 °F or 10 °C); however, Murfreesboro is close to being humid subtropical (Cf) even under Trewartha (March falls 0.9 °F (−17.3 °C) short of the threshold), supported by the fact that subtropical plants like southern magnolia trees and the occasional dwarf palmetto and needle palm shrubs can thrive long-term there but struggle much further north. The hardiness zone is 7. Temperatures range from a record low of −19 °F (−28 °C) on January 26, 1940, to a record high of 109 °F (43 °C) on August 16, 1954. Precipitation is abundant year-round without any major difference, but there is still slight variation. The wet season runs from February through July, reaching its peak in June with 5.7 inches (144 mm) of rain. The dry season runs from August through January with a September low of 3.5 inches (88 mm) and a secondary December peak of 5.6 inches (141 mm). Snowfall rarely exceeds 2.0 centimeters (8/10 in).

Climate data for Murfreesboro, Tennessee (1991–2020 normals, extremes 1890–present)
| Month | Jan | Feb | Mar | Apr | May | Jun | Jul | Aug | Sep | Oct | Nov | Dec | Year |
|---|---|---|---|---|---|---|---|---|---|---|---|---|---|
| Record high °F (°C) | 78 (26) | 83 (28) | 89 (32) | 91 (33) | 97 (36) | 108 (42) | 108 (42) | 109 (43) | 107 (42) | 97 (36) | 87 (31) | 77 (25) | 109 (43) |
| Mean maximum °F (°C) | 68 (20) | 72 (22) | 79 (26) | 84 (29) | 89 (32) | 94 (34) | 96 (36) | 96 (36) | 94 (34) | 86 (30) | 78 (26) | 69 (21) | 98 (37) |
| Mean daily maximum °F (°C) | 47.9 (8.8) | 52.5 (11.4) | 61.1 (16.2) | 70.9 (21.6) | 79.0 (26.1) | 86.2 (30.1) | 89.2 (31.8) | 89.0 (31.7) | 83.8 (28.8) | 73.1 (22.8) | 60.9 (16.1) | 51.3 (10.7) | 70.4 (21.3) |
| Daily mean °F (°C) | 37.7 (3.2) | 41.4 (5.2) | 49.1 (9.5) | 58.3 (14.6) | 67.2 (19.6) | 75.3 (24.1) | 78.8 (26.0) | 77.8 (25.4) | 71.6 (22.0) | 59.9 (15.5) | 48.9 (9.4) | 41.2 (5.1) | 58.9 (14.9) |
| Mean daily minimum °F (°C) | 27.5 (−2.5) | 30.4 (−0.9) | 37.2 (2.9) | 45.7 (7.6) | 55.3 (12.9) | 64.4 (18.0) | 68.4 (20.2) | 66.6 (19.2) | 59.3 (15.2) | 46.7 (8.2) | 36.8 (2.7) | 31.0 (−0.6) | 47.4 (8.6) |
| Mean minimum °F (°C) | 9 (−13) | 13 (−11) | 20 (−7) | 29 (−2) | 39 (4) | 52 (11) | 59 (15) | 56 (13) | 43 (6) | 30 (−1) | 20 (−7) | 15 (−9) | 7 (−14) |
| Record low °F (°C) | −19 (−28) | −16 (−27) | 2 (−17) | 19 (−7) | 32 (0) | 38 (3) | 47 (8) | 41 (5) | 33 (1) | 21 (−6) | −3 (−19) | −9 (−23) | −19 (−28) |
| Average precipitation inches (mm) | 4.66 (118) | 4.87 (124) | 5.29 (134) | 4.83 (123) | 4.93 (125) | 5.68 (144) | 4.95 (126) | 3.61 (92) | 4.04 (103) | 3.46 (88) | 4.06 (103) | 5.54 (141) | 55.92 (1,420) |
| Average snowfall inches (cm) | 0.8 (2.0) | 0.7 (1.8) | 0.4 (1.0) | 0.0 (0.0) | 0.0 (0.0) | 0.0 (0.0) | 0.0 (0.0) | 0.0 (0.0) | 0.0 (0.0) | 0.0 (0.0) | 0.0 (0.0) | 0.3 (0.76) | 2.2 (5.6) |
| Average precipitation days (≥ 0.01 in) | 12.4 | 11.7 | 12.5 | 11.1 | 12.3 | 12.4 | 10.8 | 9.9 | 8.9 | 9.6 | 10.1 | 12.8 | 134.5 |
| Average snowy days (≥ 0.1 in) | 0.7 | 0.7 | 0.3 | 0.0 | 0.0 | 0.0 | 0.0 | 0.0 | 0.0 | 0.0 | 0.0 | 0.4 | 2.1 |
Source: NOAA

== Demographics ==
Historical population
| Census | Pop. | Note | %± |
|---|---|---|---|
| 1830 | 786 | | — |
| 1840 | 1,069 | | 36.0% |
| 1850 | 1,917 | | 79.3% |
| 1860 | 2,861 | | 49.2% |
| 1870 | 3,502 | | 22.4% |
| 1880 | 3,800 | | 8.5% |
| 1890 | 3,739 | | −1.6% |
| 1900 | 3,999 | | 7.0% |
| 1910 | 4,679 | | 17.0% |
| 1920 | 5,367 | | 14.7% |
| 1930 | 7,993 | | 48.9% |
| 1940 | 9,495 | | 18.8% |
| 1950 | 13,052 | | 37.5% |
| 1960 | 18,991 | | 45.5% |
| 1970 | 26,360 | | 38.8% |
| 1980 | 32,845 | | 24.6% |
| 1990 | 44,922 | | 36.8% |
| 2000 | 68,816 | | 53.2% |
| 2010 | 108,755 | | 58.0% |
| 2020 | 152,769 | | 40.5% |
| 2025 (est.) | 171,178 | ▲ | 12.1% |
Sources: U.S. Census Bureau; U.S. Decennial Census

As of the 2020 census, 152,769 people lived in the city.

=== Racial and ethnic composition ===
Murfreesboro city, Tennessee – Racial and ethnic composition Note: the US census treats Hispanic/Latino as an ethnic category. This table excludes Latinos from the racial categories and assigns them to a separate category. Hispanics/Latinos may be of any race.
| Race / Ethnicity (NH = Non-Hispanic) | Pop 2000 | Pop 2010 | Pop 2020 | % 2000 | % 2010 | % 2020 |
|---|---|---|---|---|---|---|
| White alone (NH) | 53,963 | 79,471 | 94,941 | 78.42% | 73.07% | 62.15% |
| Black or African American alone (NH) | 9,506 | 16,333 | 29,416 | 13.81% | 15.02% | 19.26% |
| Native American or Alaska Native alone (NH) | 173 | 292 | 398 | 0.25% | 0.27% | 0.26% |
| Asian alone (NH) | 1,841 | 3,628 | 5,748 | 2.68% | 3.34% | 3.76% |
| Pacific Islander alone (NH) | 15 | 43 | 90 | 0.02% | 0.04% | 0.06% |
| Some other race alone (NH) | 69 | 131 | 815 | 0.10% | 0.12% | 0.53% |
| Mixed or multiracial (NH) | 819 | 2,404 | 7,443 | 1.19% | 2.21% | 4.87% |
| Hispanic or Latino (any race) | 2,430 | 6,453 | 13,918 | 3.53% | 5.93% | 9.11% |
| Total | 68,816 | 108,755 | 152,769 | 100.00% | 100.00% | 100.00% |

=== 2020 census ===
As of the 2020 census, Murfreesboro had a population of 152,769. The median age was 31.9 years. 23.5% of residents were under the age of 18 and 10.8% of residents were 65 years of age or older. For every 100 females there were 93.2 males, and for every 100 females age 18 and over there were 90.2 males age 18 and over.

99.5% of residents lived in urban areas, while 0.5% lived in rural areas.

There were 58,999 households in Murfreesboro, of which 33.1% had children under the age of 18 living in them. Of all households, 41.4% were married-couple households, 19.8% were households with a male householder and no spouse or partner present, and 31.0% were households with a female householder and no spouse or partner present. About 28.2% of all households were made up of individuals and 7.4% had someone living alone who was 65 years of age or older.

There were 62,905 housing units, of which 6.2% were vacant. The homeowner vacancy rate was 1.6% and the rental vacancy rate was 7.3%.

=== 2010 census ===
As of the 2010 census, 108,755 people were living in the city. The racial makeup of the city was 75.62% White, 15.18% Black or African American, 0.35% Native American, 3.36% Asian, 0.04% Pacific Islander, 2.79% from other races, and 2.65% from two or more races. Hispanics or Latinos of any race were 5.93% of the population.

Of the 26,511 households, 30.7% had children under 18 living with them, 43.8% were married couples living together, 11.9% had a female householder with no husband present, and 40.6% were not families. About 28.3% of all households were made up of individuals, and 7.0% had someone living alone who was 65 or older. The average household size was 2.42 and the average family size was 3.02.

In the city, the age distribution was 22.7% under 18, 20.5% from 18 to 24, 30.8% from 25 to 44, 17.3% from 45 to 64, and 8.8% who were 65 or older. The median age was 29 years. For every 100 females, there were 98.7 males. For every 100 females 18 and over, there were 97.2 males.

The median income for a household in the city was $39,705, and for a family was $52,654. Males had a median income of $36,078 versus $26,531 for females. The per capita income for the city was $20,219. About 8.2% of families and 14.1% of the population were below the poverty line, including 12.0% of those under 18 and 11.1% of those 65 and older.

=== Estimates and special censuses ===
Special census estimates in 2005 indicated 81,393 residents, and in 2006, the U.S. Census Bureau's American Community Survey estimated a population of 92,559, with 35,842 households and 20,979 families in the city. Murfreesboro's 2008 special census reported that the population had reached 100,575, while preliminary information from the 2010 U.S. census indicates a population of 108,755. In October 2017, the City of Murfreesboro started another special census. Given the continuous growth in the general area, the population is expected to exceed the 2016 estimate of 131,947. According to Money.com in 2018, 136,000 people called Murfreesboro home and it would see a nearly 10% expansion of jobs in the coming years.

== Economy ==
=== Top employers ===
According to Murfreesboro's 2023 Comprehensive Annual Financial Report, the top employers in Rutherford County are:

| # | Employer | # of Employees |
|---|---|---|
| 1 | Nissan | 8,000 |
| 2 | Rutherford County government and schools | 7,441 |
| 3 | Amazon Fulfillment Center | 2,700 |
| 4 | City of Murfreesboro (includes schools) | 2,388 |
| 5 | Middle Tennessee State University | 2,205 |
| 6 | Ascension St. Thomas Rutherford | 1,741 |
| 7 | Ingram Content Group | 1,700 |
| 8 | Taylor Farms | 1,700 |
| 9 | Alvin C. York Veterans Administration Medical Center | 1,300 |
| 10 | Asurion | 1,250 |

== Arts and culture ==
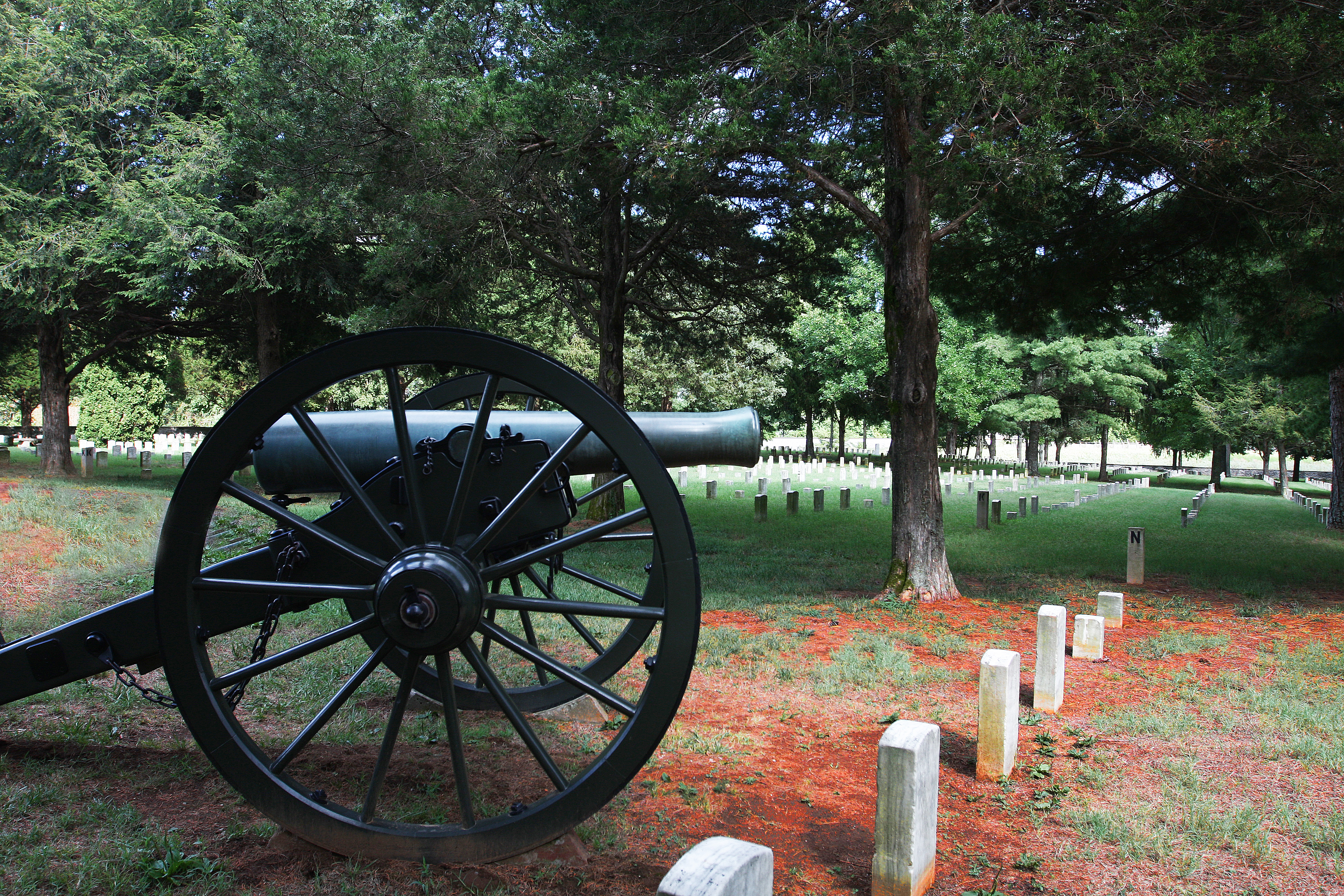
Cemetery at Stones River National Battlefield

=== Music ===
Murfreesboro hosts several music-oriented events annually, such as the Main Street Jazzfest presented by MTSU's School of Music and the Main Street Association each May. For over 30 years, Uncle Dave Macon Days has celebrated the musical tradition of Uncle Dave Macon. This annual July event includes national competitions for old-time music and dancing.

Murfreesboro also hosts an annual DIY not-for-profit music festival called Boro Fondo, which is also a bike tour and local artist feature.

=== Arts ===
The Murfreesboro Center for the Arts, close to the Square, entertains with a variety of exhibits, theatre arts, concerts, dances, and magic shows. Murfreesboro Little Theatre has provided the community with popular and alternative forms of theatre arts since 1962.

Murfreesboro's International FolkFest began in 1982, and is held annually during the second week in June. Groups from countries spanning the globe participate in the festival, performing traditional songs and dances while attired in regional apparel.

=== Museums ===
The Discovery Center at Murfree Spring is a nature center and interactive museum focusing on children and families. The facility includes 20 acres (8 ha) of wetlands with a variety of animals.

Bradley Academy Museum contains collectibles and exhibits of the first school in Rutherford County. This school was later renovated to become the only African American school in Murfreesboro, which closed in 1955.

The Stones River National Battlefield is a national park that memorializes the Battle of Stones River, which took place during the American Civil War during December 31, 1862, to January 3, 1863. The grounds include a museum, a national cemetery, monuments, and the remains of a large earthen fortification called Fortress Rosecrans.

Oaklands Historic House Museum is a 19th-century mansion which became involved in the Civil War. It was occupied as a residence until the 1950s, after which it was purchased by the City of Murfreesboro and renovated into a museum by the Oaklands Association.

Earth Experience: The Middle Tennessee Museum of Natural History is the only natural history museum in Middle Tennessee. The museum opened in September 2014 and features more than 2,000 items on display, including a complete replica Tyrannosaurus rex skeleton.

=== Commerce ===
Two main malls are located within the city limits. Stones River Mall is a traditional enclosed mall featuring many stores and restaurants, and The Avenue Murfreesboro is an outdoor lifestyle center.

The Historic Downtown Murfreesboro district also offers a wide variety of shopping and dining experiences that encircle the pre-Civil War Courthouse.

Murfreesboro is the home of a Consolidated Mail Outpatient Pharmacy, part of an initiative by the Department of Veterans Affairs to provide mail-order prescriptions to veterans using computerization at strategic locations throughout the United States. It is located on the campus of the Alvin C. York Veterans Hospital.

The City Center building (also known as the Swanson Building) is the tallest building in Murfreesboro. Located in the downtown area, it was built by Joseph Swanson in 1989. It has 15 floors, including a large penthouse, and stands 211 feet (64 m) tall. As a commercial building its tenants include Bank of America and is the headquarters for the National Healthcare Corporation (NHC).

=== Points of interest ===
- Discovery Center at Murfree Spring
- Geographic center of Tennessee
- Middle Tennessee State University
- Oaklands Historic House Museum
- Stones River Greenway Arboretum
- Stones River National Battlefield

== Parks and recreation ==
Cannonsburgh Village is a reproduction of what a working pioneer village would have looked like from the period of the 1830s to the 1930s. Visitors can view the grist mill, school house, doctor's office, Leeman House, Caboose, Wedding Chapel, and other points of interest. It is also home to the World's Largest Cedar Bucket.

Old Fort Park is a 50-acre (200,000 m^{2}) park which includes baseball fields, tennis courts, children's playground, an 18-hole championship golf course, picnic shelters and bike trail.

Barfield Crescent Park is a 430-acre (1,700,000 m^{2}) facility with eight baseball fields, 7 miles (11 km) of biking/running trails, an 18-hole championship disc golf course, and ten picnic shelters.

Murfreesboro Greenway System is a system of greenways with 12 miles (19 km) of paved paths and 11 trail heads. In 2013, the city council approved a controversial 25-year "master plan" to extend the system by adding 173 miles (278 km) worth of new greenways, bikeways and blueways at an estimated cost of $104.8 million.

== Government and politics ==
The city council has six members, all elected at-large to four-year terms, on staggered schedules with elections every two years. The mayor is also elected at large. City council members have responsibilities for various city departments.

List of mayors of Murfreesboro, Tennessee
- Joshua Haskell, 1818
- David Wendel, 1819
- Robert Purdy, 1820
- Henry Holmes, 1821
- W. R. Rucker, 1822–1823
- John Jones, 1824
- Wm. Ledbetter, 1825, 1827
- John Smith, 1828, 1830
- Edward Fisher, 1829, 1836, 1839
- James C. Moore, 1831
- Charles Ready, 1832
- Charles Niles, 1833
- Marman Spence, 1834
- M. Spence, 1835
- L. H. Carney, 1837
- Edwin Augustus Keeble, 1838, 1855
- G. A. Sublett, 1840
- B. W. Farmer, 1841–1842, 1845–1846
- Henderson King Yoakum, 1843
- Wilson Thomas, 1844
- John Leiper, 1847–1848
- Charles Ready, 1849–1853, 1867
- F. Henry, 1854
- Joseph B. Palmer, 1856–1859
- John W. Burton, 1860–1861
- John E. Dromgoole, 1862
- James Monro Tompkins, 1863–1864
- R. D. Reed, 1865–1866
- E. L. Jordan, 1868–1869
- Thomas B. Darragh, 1870
- Joseph A. January 1871
- I. B. Collier, 1872–1873
- J. B. Murfree, 1874–1875
- H. H. Kerr, 1876
- H. H. Clayton, 1877
- N. C. Collier, 1878–1879
- Jas. Clayton, 1880–1881
- E. F. Burton, 1882–1883
- J. M. Overall, 1884–1885
- H. E. Palmer, 1886–1887
- Tom H. Woods, 1888–1895
- J. T. Wrather, 1896–1897
- J. O. Oslin, 1898–1899
- J. H. Chrichlow, 1900–1909
- G. B. Giltner, 1910–1918
- N. C. Maney, 1919–1922, 1932–1934
- Al D. McKnight, 1923–1931
- W. T. Gerhardt, 1934–1936, 1941–1942
- W. A. Miles, 1937–1940, 1943–1946
- John T. Holloway, 1947–1950
- Jennings A. Jones, 1951–1954
- A. L. Todd Jr., 1955–1964
- William Hollis Westbrooks, 1965-1982
- Joe B. Jackson, 1982-1998
- Richard Reeves, 1998-2002
- Tommy Bragg, 2002-2014
- Shane McFarland, 2014–present

=== Political makeup ===
Murfreesboro is a majority conservative city and usually votes Republican in statewide elections. Engineer Your Finances ranked Murfreesboro in the top 10 for most conservatives cities in the U.S. in 2024. RoadSnacks ranked the city 85th for the most conservative cities in Tennessee for 2025.

Murfreesboro Presidential election results
| Year | Republican | Democratic | Third parties |
|---|---|---|---|
| 2024 | 56.85% 36,079 | 41.51% 26,343 | 1.64% 1,039 |
| 2020 | 53.03% 34,141 | 44.65% 28,743 | 2.32% 1,493 |
| 2016 | 56.83% 27,209 | 36.94% 17,687 | 6.23% 2,983 |

Murfreesboro federal Senate election results
| Year | Republican | Democratic | Third parties |
|---|---|---|---|
| 2024 | 56.2% 35,105 | 41.4% 25,841 | 2.4% 1,487 |
| 2020 | 55.1% 34,080 | 42.3% 26,129 | 2.6% 1,626 |
| 2018 | 49.7% 22,220 | 49.2% 21,999 | 1.1% 512 |

Murfreesboro Gubernatorial election results
| Year | Republican | Democratic | Third parties |
|---|---|---|---|
| 2022 | 59.0% | 39.0% | 2.1% |
| 2018 | 54.7% 24,428 | 44.3% 19,771 | 1.0% 441 |

== Education ==
Elementary education within the city is overseen by Murfreesboro City Schools (MCS). MCS focuses on prekindergarten through sixth grade learning. The city has 12 schools serving 8,800 students between grades pre-K through 6th.

Secondary schools are overseen by Rutherford County Schools, which has 50 schools and a student population of over 49,000.

The Japanese Supplementary School in Middle Tennessee (JSMT, 中部テネシー日本語補習校 Chūbu Teneshī Nihongo Hoshūkō), a weekend Japanese education program, holds its classes in Peck Hall at Middle Tennessee State University, while its school offices are in Jefferson Square.

== Media ==
Murfreesboro is serviced by the following media outlets:

Newspapers:

- The Daily News Journal
- The Murfreesboro Post
- The Murfreesboro Pulse
- Sidelines – MTSU student newspaper
- Rutherford Source
- The Sword of the Lord

Radio:

- WGNS – Talk radio
- WMOT – MTSU public radio station
- WMTS-FM – MTSU free-form student-run station
- WRHW-LP - 3ABN Radio Christian

TV:

- City TV Murfreesboro, Channel 3 – Government-access television channel
- MTN – MTSU student-run educational-access television channel

== Infrastructure ==
=== Transportation ===
Murfreesboro is served by Nashville International Airport (IATA code BNA), Smyrna Airport (MQY) and Murfreesboro Municipal Airport (MBT). The city also benefits from several highways running through the city, including Interstates 24 and 840; U.S. Routes 41, 70S, and 231; and State Routes 1, 2, 10, 96, 99, and 268.

Industry also has access to north–south rail service with the rail line from Nashville to Chattanooga. Into the latter 1940s the Nashville, Chattanooga & St. Louis Railway's #3/#4 (Memphis - Nashville - Atlanta) served Murfreesboro. By 1950 that train's route was shortened to Nashville - Atlanta. Until 1965 the Louisville & Nashville's Dixie Flyer (Chicago - Florida) made a stop in the town on its route. Likewise, the #3/#2 (renumbered from #3/4) continued to that period as an overnight train between Nashville and Atlanta, also making a stop in town.

==== Public transportation ====
In April 2007, the City of Murfreesboro established a public transportation system with nine small buses, each capable of holding sixteen people and including two spaces for wheelchairs. The system is called Rover; the buses are bright green with Rover and a cartoon dog painted on the side. As of 2019, buses operate in six major corridors: Memorial Boulevard, Gateway, Old Fort Parkway, South Church Street, Highland Avenue and Mercury Boulevard.

A one-way fare is $1.00 for adults, 50 cents for children 6–16 and seniors 65 and over, and free for children under 6. The system operates Monday to Friday, 6:00 a.m. to 6:00 p.m.

== Notable people ==
- Ronnie Alsup (1955–2014), paralympic athlete and standing volleyball player
- Jerry Anderson (1953–1989), football player
- Rankin Barbee (1874–1958), journalist and author
- Ronnie Barrett (born 1954), firearms manufacturer
- Raymond Berry (1933–2026), NFL player and coach
- Rex Brothers (born 1987), former Major League Baseball pitcher
- Elizabeth Childress Brown (1842–1919), First Lady of Tennessee and President General of the United Daughters of the Confederacy
- James M. Buchanan (1919–2013), economist
- Bryan M. Clayton - businessman and real estate investor, CEO and cofounder of GreenPal
- Reno Collier, stand-up comedian
- Crystal Dangerfield (born 1998), Los Angeles Sparks point guard
- Marisa Davila (born 1997), actress and singer
- Colton Dixon (born 1991), singer
- Will Allen Dromgoole, (1860–1934), author and poet
- Harold Earthman (1900–1987), politician
- Mary Ann Eckles (born 1947), politician
- Corn Elder (born 1994), football player
- Jeff Givens (died 2013), horse trainer
- Bart Gordon (born 1949), politician and lawyer
- Francis Avent Gumm (1886–1935), vaudevillian, theater manager, and father of Judy Garland
- Joe Black Hayes (1915–2013), football player
- James Sanders Holman (1804–1867), 1st mayor of Houston, Texas
- Montori Hughes (born 1990), football player
- Yolanda Hughes-Heying (born 1963), professional female bodybuilder
- Robert James (born 1947), football player
- Marshall Keeble (1878–1962), African American preacher
- Sarah McKelley King (1921–2013), 33rd President General of the Daughters of the American Revolution
- Muhammed Lawal (born 1981), mixed martial artist
- Mike Liles (1945–2022), businessman and politician
- Sondra Locke (1944–2018), actress and director
- Andrew Nelson Lytle (1902–1995), novelist, dramatist, essayist and professor
- Jean MacArthur (1898–2000), wife of U.S. Army General of the Army Douglas MacArthur
- Bayer Mack (born 1972), filmmaker, journalist and founder of Block Starz Music.
- Matt Mahaffey (born 1973), record producer and recording engineer
- Marvin Maple (1936–2016), grandfather arrested at age 73 for kidnapping two of his grandchildren more than 20 years earlier
- Philip D. McCulloch Jr. (1851–1928), politician
- Ridley McLean (1872–1933), United States Navy Rear Admiral
- Judith Ann Neelley (born 1964), double murderer
- William Northcott (1854–1917), lieutenant governor of Illinois
- Andre Alice Norton (1912–2005), author of science fiction and fantasy
- Joseph B. Palmer (1825–1890), lawyer, legislator, and soldier
- Sarah Childress Polk (1803–1891), First Lady of the United States
- Patrick Porter, singer-songwriter
- David Price (born 1985), Major League Baseball pitcher
- Grantland Rice (1880–1954), iconic sportswriter, journalist and poet
- Darryl Sage (born 1965), racing driver
- Mary Scales (1928–2013), professor and civic leader
- Robert W. Scales (1926–2000), Vice-Mayor of Murfreesboro
- Margaret Rhea Seddon (born 1947), NASA astronaut
- Adam Smith (born 1990), Arena Football League player
- Chuck Taylor (born 1942), Major League Baseball relief pitcher
- Audrey Whitby (born 1996), actress
- Barry Wilmore (born 1962), NASA astronaut
- Chris Young (born 1985), country music artist

== Notable bands ==
- Abated Mass of Flesh, brutal death metal
- Destroy Destroy Destroy, heavy metal
- De Novo Dahl, indie rock
- Feable Weiner, power pop
- Fluid Ounces, power pop
- Flummox, avant-garde metal
- Glossary, indie rock and roll/Americana
- The Katies, power pop
- The Plain, rock
- The Protomen, rock opera
- Self, alternative pop/rock
- The Tony Danza Tapdance Extravaganza, mathcore
- Velcro Stars, pop

== See also ==
- Blackman, Tennessee
- Boxwood (Murfreesboro, Tennessee)
- Barrett Firearms Manufacturing
- First Presbyterian Church (Murfreesboro, Tennessee)
- Murfreesboro Musicians
- Murphy Center
- Evergreen Cemetery
