= Negley =

Negley may refer to:

== People with the surname ==
- Daniel James Negley Farson (1927–1997), British writer and broadcaster on commercial television
- Negley Farson (1890–1960), American author and adventurer
- James S. Negley (1826–1901), American Civil War General, farmer, railroader, U.S. Representative from the state of Pennsylvania
- Laura Negley (1890–1973), American politician, member of the Texas House of Representatives

== Places ==
- Negley, Ohio, census-designated place in northeastern Middleton Township, Columbiana County, Ohio, United States
- Negley, Texas, unincorporated community in Red River County, Texas, about ten miles north of Clarksville
- Negley station, on the East Busway, located in Shadyside and near the East Liberty and Friendship neighborhoods of Pittsburgh
- Fort Negley, fortification built by Union troops after the capture of Nashville, Tennessee during the American Civil War
- 8802 Negley, minor planet

== See also ==
- Negley-Gwinner-Harter House, 5061 Fifth Avenue in the Shadyside neighborhood of Pittsburgh, Pennsylvania, built 1870–1871
- Egley
