= Bass Street Church (Nashville) =

Church in Nashville, Tennessee, USA

- Bass Street Missionary Baptist Church
- Bass Street Church
- 36.2489049327499°N 86.77556861033841°W
- Location: Nashville, TN
- Address: 3447 Brick Church Pike, Nashville, TN 37207
- Denomination: Baptist

History
- Founded: 1883

Clergy
- Pastor(s): Daryl A. Thompson, Sr.

Bass Street Church is a historic church founded in 1883 in the Bass Street Community of Nashville, a neighborhood created by emancipated Black people that previously resided at Fort Negley during the Civil War.

== Historical foundations of Bass Street and the church ==
=== Fort Negley ===
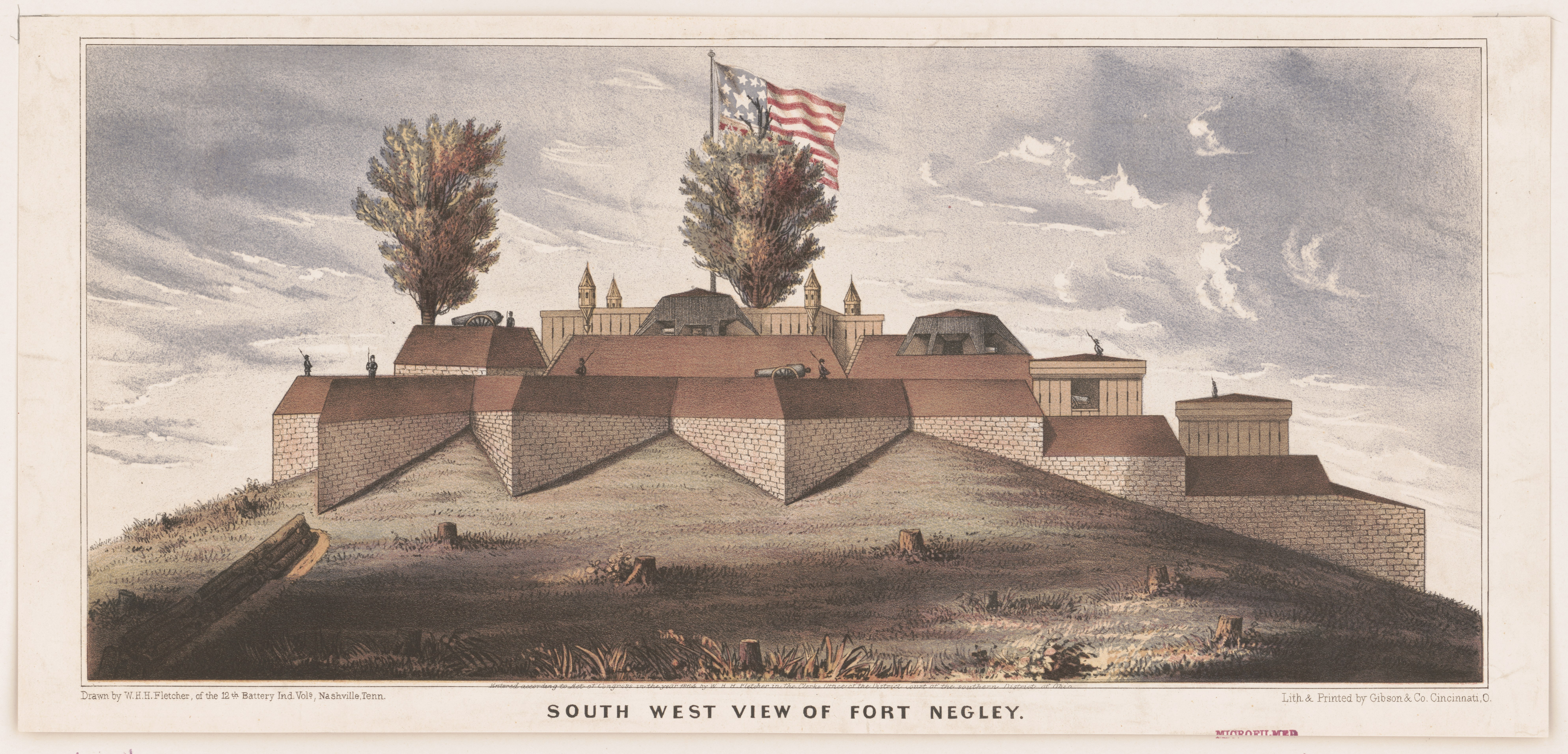
Southwest view of Fort Negley

During the Civil War, the Union Army saw Nashville as an opportunity to maintain a strong presence in the South by utilizing it as a hub to house troops and transport supplies. To fulfill this idea, the army assigned General James S. Negley to fortify the city. At first, Black residents that were skilled workers were recruited with the promise that they would be paid. However, recruitment was low, which led to a labor shortage. To solve this, the Union army forced the conscription of both free Black people as well as previously enslaved refugees (dubbed “contrabands”). These people worked to build forts and encampments, cooked, and performed other tasks for the soldiers. The workers were also promised wages, but most of what was promised was not given. In addition, the conditions were abysmal, with long hours and little food and shelter; this led to the deaths of hundreds of people.

Unfortunately, the Emancipation Proclamation did not free them from this forced work. This is because Tennessee had returned to the Union before the proclamation was issued on January 1, 1863, and it only applied to states that were currently seceded. It wasn't until October 1864 that all enslaved people in Tennessee were declared free.

=== Formation of the Bass Street neighborhood ===
After the Civil War ended in 1865, many newly emancipated Black people who resided at Fort Negley decided to build neighborhoods around the fort. One such neighborhood was the Edgehill Neighborhood- now known as the Bass Street Community- which formed after the Union Army left. In the years following the Union Army's departure, Fort Negley became a meeting place for the Ku Klux Klan; but despite the KKK's presence, the Bass Street area provided a sense of safety due to the number of retired soldiers that resided there. In fact, veterans of the US Colored Troops were able to eventually force the Klan out, causing the branch to officially disband in 1869.

=== Early beginnings of the Bass Street Church ===
The Bass Street Missionary Baptist Church was first established in 1883 located at 611 Bass Street. In 1889, Reverend William J. Bagus became the first recorded pastor of the church. An issue of the Nashville Banner from 1896 noted that the Bass Street Church was in support of a plan to build an orphanage for Black children in Tennessee. Throughout the early 1900s, the church became a center of community for the Bass street community as it held and participated in numerous events from multi-church music events to the Bass Street Baptist's Sunday School.

The church was relocated in 1909 on lot 401 of Bass Street, which was west of its primary location. As the church continued to grow, Reverend Andrew Murray and Reverend Burton Murray, the pastor and assistant pastors of the time, dismantled and started construction for the church's third iteration. During construction, services were held at 6th and 7th Avenue South from 1930 to 1933. Construction concluded in 1938 to be followed by increased growth and congregation at the church. In the newly constructed building, various organizations held meetings, including the Oddfellows and Household of Ruth. Throughout the 1940s, pastors varied between Rev. Major Alexander (1938-1940), Rev. John B. Perry (1942), Rev. Surrey Holloway (1933), and Rev. Samuel Alexander (1946).

== Challenges and resistance ==
=== Civil unrest ===
In 1930, Nashville segregated neighborhoods with African American residents by participating in redlining. The area around Fort Negley was labelled as a hazardous zone, followed by numerous white residents moving out. Further, the Federal Housing Administration declined insuring loans on houses in such areas, thus contributing greatly to the segregation occurring at the time.

Degrees of segregation and violence reached a new high by the late-1940s to early-1950s, as the American Civil Rights Movement began to arise. During this tumultuous time, Bass Street Baptist Church's Rev. John B. Perry was noted to run for city council to contribute in voicing his community's concerns and opinions, ultimately inspiring many around him.

As new Jim Crow laws were implemented in Nashville from 1953 to 1955, fear became instilled among people of color. Despite threats of violence and intimidation, many stood up to protest and advocate for themselves and their communities, including preachers and students from local Black colleges and universities. They engaged in non-violent protests, such as lunch counter sit-ins. Ultimately, efforts culminated and reached a high level, ultimately pushing Nashville to becoming the first Southern city to desegregate in 1960.

=== Urban renewal and the destruction of Bass Street ===
Throughout the 1960s, the city of Nashville commissioned “urban renewal” projects. These projects were meant to revitalize all of Nashville, but resulted in being heavily directed towards Black communities, including Bass Street. For example, despite the Bass Street community being residentially occupied at the time, one project designated the area for Interstate 65 to be built, and many residents in the vicinity were forced out of their homes. Though public documents are limited to residencies, several businesses, parks, and public buildings were also demolished. This caused irreparable damage to the community and few remnants are still visible today.

== Legacy of the Bass Street Church ==
=== Relocations ===
The earliest recorded location of the first iteration of the Bass Street Missionary Baptist Church was 611 Bass Street on lot 402. Years later in 1906, the church was listed to be issued for a permit at a new location between Seventh and Ewig avenues. However, this plan was obstructed as the second church iteration was actually established directly west from its previous location in 1909. This structure was noted to have a larger footprint area than the original church.

When the Edgehill Urban Renewal Plan was introduced in 1964, the church, which at the time was owned by the Bass Street Baptist Trust, was forced to sell and relocated to a building on 12th Ave S. The eradication of the church's second iteration saddened many members of the community and congregation due to the loss of their preserved space of worship and celebration.

=== Present day ===
Bass Street Baptist Church is now called Bass Street Missionary Baptist Church and is currently located at 3447 Brick Church Pike. The church has maintained the name "Bass Street" throughout its various relocations over the years, and many former residents, along with their descendants, remain actively involved in the present congregation.
