= Pioneer Brigade =

Union Army engineering unit

The Pioneer Brigade was a brigade of Army pioneers that served in the Union Army of the Cumberland during the American Civil War. The brigade was created by Major General William Rosecrans and commanded by James St. Clair Morton and George P. Buell, and served in the Stones River, Tullahoma, Chickamauga, and Chattanooga campaigns.

== Brigade History ==
On November 3, 1862, William Rosecrans, the Commander of the XIV Army Corps, issued General Orders No. 3, which stated: "There will be detailed immediately, from each company of every regiment of infantry in this army, 2 men, who shall be organized as a pioneer or engineer corps attached to its regiment...Under certain circumstances, it may be necessary to mass this force." This order officially created what would be known as the Pioneer Brigade.

Due to the confusing nature of Rosecrans' order, many officers misinterpreted how the men were to be organized. Previous pioneer duty required that the selected men would return to their regiment when their duty was fulfilled. Men assigned to the Pioneer Brigade were permanently detached. This would prove to be a source of contention with regimental brass who believed the assignment to be temporary. Nevertheless, the soldiers were eventually placed in three battalions (one from each wing of the army). They were placed under the command of James St. Clair Morton, the chief engineer of the XIV Army Corps. The men received their training in Nashville before returning to the army in time for the Battle of Stones River.

On December 31, the first day of the Battle of Stones River, the brigade was placed near army headquarters along the Nashville Pike by Rosecrans himself, in a reserve position after the Confederates collapsed the Union right. Here, along with the Chicago Board of Trade Battery, the Pioneers played a key role in halting the high tide of the Confederate advance, allowing Rosecrans time to rally his army and eventually win the battle.

In the months following the battle, the brigade helped to construct Fortress Rosecrans in Murfreesboro, Tennessee.

During the Tullahoma Campaign, the brigade became infamous for lacking in discipline. The men were not drilled and brought scandal on themselves by their drunken behavior.

At the Battle of Chickamauga, the brigade was at the wrong place at the wrong time, and was swept away by the Union retreat on September 20 all the way to Chattanooga. However it restored its good name in assisting the engineers in establishing the Cracker Line to relieve the city from Confederate pressure.
