= The Bayswater Omnibus =

1895 painting by George William Joy

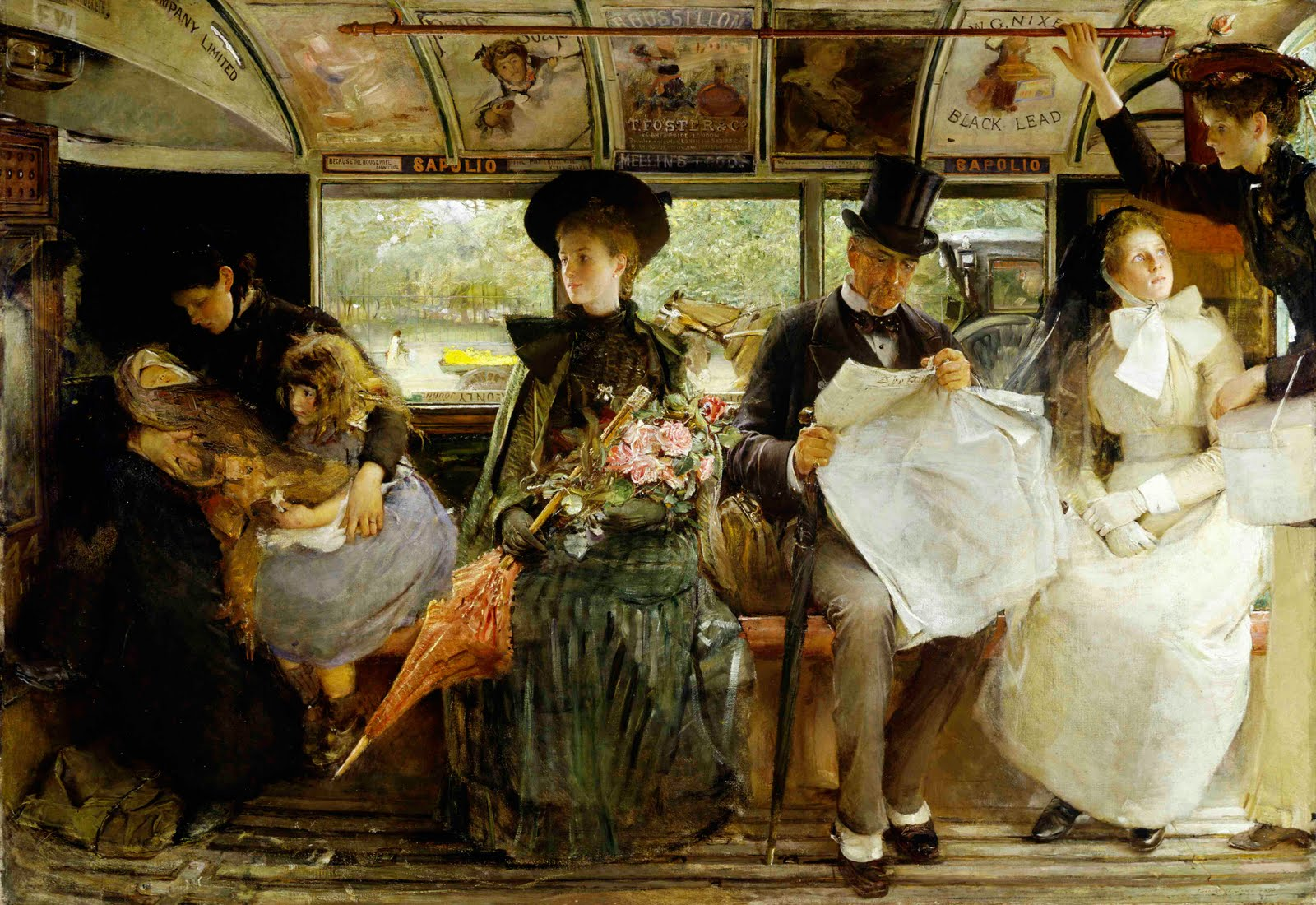
George William Joy, The Bayswater Omnibus, 1895

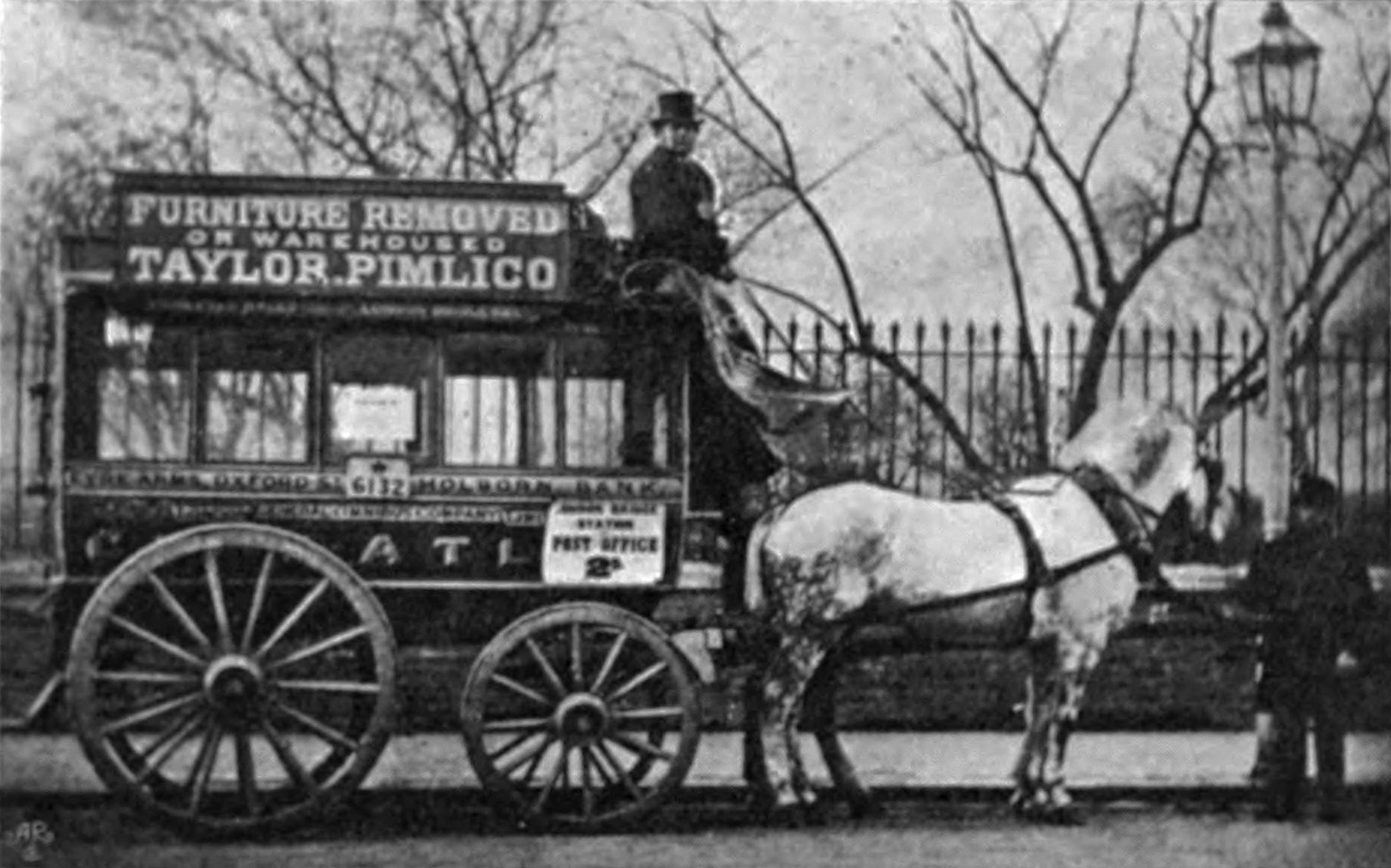
Typical London omnibus, c.1902

The Bayswater Omnibus is an 1895 oil painting by George William Joy. It has been part of the Museum of London's collection since 1966. The genre painting depicts a scene inside a horse-drawn omnibus of the London General Omnibus Company. Joy borrowed a bus from the company while he was working on his painting.

The early omnibus was a horse-drawn carriage that plied a set route, picking up and dropping off passengers as it went. It was introduced in London on 4 July 1829 and soon became a popular form of transport catering mainly to the middle classes - the working classes would rarely be able to afford the fare, and upper classes could afford their own vehicle or to hire a hackney carriage. The typical London omnibus was an enclosed and glazed carriage with four wheels, drawn by one or two horses. Passengers could sit on benches to either side inside, entering via a door at the rear, or climb up to exposed seats on the roof. A driver would ride at the front of the carriage, with a conductor taking fares and assisting passengers to climb aboard and depart.

The scene is painted as if viewed by a person on one bench inside the omnibus, looking across at passengers on the other side of the carriage. The painting depicts, from left to right, a relatively poor mother accompanied by a young girl (modelled by the artist's wife and daughter) and carrying a baby; the central figure is a fashionably well-dressed young woman, with a long-handled parasol and basket of flowers; she sits beside a city gentleman in top hat and frock coat reading his newspaper; and then closer to the door are two more women: a nurse seated in her starched uniform, and a milliner boarding the bus, holding a handrail with one hand and clasping a hatbox with the other.

The side of the carriage behind and above the passengers is covered with advertising posters, including Millais's Bubbles painting for Pears soap (Millais studied beside Joy). Visible through the window, a hansom cab passes on the road beyond.

The painting was exhibited at the Royal Academy Exhibition of 1895 and the Salon of 1896 in Paris as well as at the Southport Spring Exhibition in 1900. It was donated to the Museum of London by the artist's daughter Rosalind B. Joy in 1966. It measures 140 by 196 centimetres (55 in × 77 in).

== See also ==
- Omnibus Life in London by William Maw Egley (1859)
