= Egley =

Egley is a surname. Notable people with the surname include:

- William Egley (1798–1870), English painter
- William Maw Egley (1826–1916), English artist, son of William

== See also ==
- Égly, France
