= Life in London =

Life in London may refer to:

- Bell's Life in London, an English weekly sporting paper
- Life in London (novel), an 1821 book by Pierce Egan
- Tom and Jerry, or Life in London, an 1821 play adapted from Egan's book

== See also ==
- Culture of London
- Omnibus Life in London, an 1859 oil painting
- Street Life in London, an 1877 book by Adolphe Smith and John Thomson
- London Life (disambiguation)
