= James St. Clair Morton =

American military officer (1829–1864)

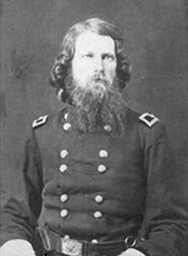
- Brig. Gen. James St. Clair Morton
- Born: September 24, 1829; Philadelphia, Pennsylvania, U.S.
- Died: June 17, 1864 (aged 34); Petersburg, Virginia, U.S. †
- Burial place: Laurel Hill Cemetery, Philadelphia, Pennsylvania, U.S.
- Relatives: Samuel George Morton (father)
- Military career
- Allegiance: United States; Union
- Branch: United States Army; Union Army
- Service years: 1851–1864
- Rank: Brigadier General
- Commands: Chief Engineer Army of the Ohio, Chief Engineer Army of the Cumberland, Pioneer Brigade, Chief Engineer IX Corps
- Conflicts: American Civil War; Battle of Stones River; Battle of Chickamauga; Battle of North Anna; Battle of Totopotomoy Creek; Second Battle of Petersburg †

James St. Clair Morton (September 24, 1829 – June 17, 1864) was an American military officer who served as chief engineer of the Army of the Ohio, the Army of the Cumberland and the XI Corps in the Union Army during the American Civil War. He led construction of key embattlements protecting Nashville, Tennessee including Fort Negley and Fortress Rosencrans. He served as major in the regular army and was promoted to brigadier general of the Pioneer Brigade in the volunteer army. Morton requested a reduction in rank from brigadier general of volunteers (but kept his rank of major in the regular army) after being reprimanded by General William Rosecrans in front of colleagues due to drunkenness in the ranks and errors in troop placement. He was killed in action during the Second Battle of Petersburg and brevetted brigadier general posthumously.

== Early life and engineering career ==
Morton was born on September 24, 1829, in the Germantown neighborhood of Philadelphia, Pennsylvania. He was the oldest of eight children of Samuel George Morton and Rebecca Pearsall. At the age of 14, he entered the University of Pennsylvania. He graduated in 1851, second in his class, from the United States Military Academy. He was assigned to the Corps of Engineers and served as the assistant engineer of construction of forts around Charleston, SC, including Fort Sumter, from 1851 to 1852. He served as the assistant engineer of construction at Fort Delaware until 1855, then returned to the United States Military Academy to teach as an assistant professor of mathematics and military engineering for two years. On April 1, 1854, Morton was promoted to second lieutenant in the Corps of Engineers. From June 1857 to March 1858, he served as assistant engineer of construction of fortifications at Sandy Hook to protect New York City. He was appointed as engineer and superintendent of the New York lighthouse district by the Treasury Department.

He rejected the contemporary military strategy of the time and was a strong advocate of Dennis Hart Mahan. Morton wrote essays to Secretary of War John B. Floyd regarding Mahan's principals, and on request from Floyd, evaluated Colonel Joseph Totten's plans to defend New York City. The findings were presented to Floyd in his Memoir on the Dangers and Defenses of New York City, which showed that improvement was needed.

He was appointed by the Department of the Interior as chief engineer of the Potomac water works in the District of Columbia and led work on the Washington Aqueduct and the Washington Monument. During this time, Morton would also be promoted to first lieutenant.

In 1860, Morton was selected by the Navy Department to examine the Chiriquí Province in Central America for the possibility of a railroad across the Isthmus of Panama. He concluded from his findings that it was possible, but contracted malaria while in the area.

While recovering in Washington, Morton was sent in March 1861 to Dry Tortugas, Florida to act as the supervising engineer for Fort Jefferson. With the orders to put the fort into fighting condition, he attempted to help conceive a 420-gun fort and was promoted to captain on August 6, 1861. When malaria affected Morton again in early 1862, he returned to Washington to recover. Once he was well, he helped with the repairs at Fort Mifflin, Pennsylvania.

== Civil War ==
=== Army of the Ohio service ===
In May 1862, Morton was assigned to the Army of the Ohio as chief engineer under General Don Carlos Buell. He led construction of fortifications around Nashville, Tennessee and was ordered to stay and complete construction while the Army of the Ohio marched to Kentucky. The construction of these defenses, named Fort Negley, was the second most fortified stronghold only outdone by Washington, D.C. It was built using over 2,700 conscripted slaves and free blacks from a nearby camp.

=== Army of the Cumberland and Pioneer Brigade service ===
When General Buell was relieved of command in October 1862, Morton became chief of engineers of the Army of the Cumberland under General William S. Rosecrans. Rosecrans, who was facing engineering problems, organized the Pioneer Brigade, with the intentions of forming an engineer unit. This brigade would be composed of mechanics and laborers, totaling 2,600 men. They were ordered to train in Nashville for a month and on November 29, 1862, Morton was commissioned as Brigadier General of Volunteers, a position which President Abraham Lincoln had promised him.

In late December, about 1,700 men of the Pioneer Brigade would join the rest of the Army of the Cumberland on its march to Murfreesboro, Tennessee. Arriving on the outskirts of the city on the 29th, they were ordered to build bridges and abatis, to clear roads, and improve fords. On the morning of the 31st, the Pioneer Brigade was positioned to the rear of the Union army. Around mid-day, the brigade was ordered forward to support Captain James Stokes' Chicago Board of Trade Battery, which was positioned on a small knoll west of the Nashville Turnpike, behind the center of the Union lines. Upon arriving, they witnessed hundreds of fleeing soldiers, with the Confederate forces reforming for another attack. The Pioneer Brigade was immediately behind the front lines now and from their position, had a clear view of open ground in front of them, offering Stokes' battery a deadly advantage.

When the Confederates launched the attack, Morton ordered Stokes' battery to open fire with canister, which effectively drove the attackers away. He then advanced to a rise and held it under the fire of enemy artillery. This repulse helped General Rosecrans buy time as he regrouped stragglers and brought up fresh units to reform the line. While he was doing this, three more charges were thrust upon the forward line, with the last charge finally breaking them, causing them to retreat back to the turnpike. Morton had his brigade form upon Stokes' battery again. Once Rosecrans had formed a new line, the Pioneer Brigade and Stokes' battery were re-adjusted to fit the line, being moved to the front of the turnpike and the right of the new line. Additional troops that had been rallied were brought to the right of Morton.

As the front line continued to withdraw, they appeared from the woods directly in front of Morton and then slowly took refuge behind his lines. The Confederates, still in pursuit, began to appear from the woods, allowing Stokes' battery to open fire with canister. Morton rode to the front of his troops and said, "Men, you haven't much ammunition, but give them what you have and then wade in on `em with the bayonets!" With that, the lines were ordered to stand and open fire, putting gaps into the oncoming Confederate lines. The lines wavered and then began to withdraw. Upon seeing the success, Rosecrans order the brigade to charge forward and occupy the fields just outside the woods. The Confederates rallied three times and pressed forward again, but each time, were forced back.

The following day brought the New Year, with only minor skirmishing. The Pioneer Brigade was ordered to the rear and allowed to rest.

On January 2, Confederate General John C. Breckinridge attacked the Union left center and was successful in capturing a number of guns. As the Pioneer Brigade moved towards the action, the Confederates had already begun retreating, and Morton had his brigade participate in their pursuit.

The Confederates withdrew from the city on the 4th, leaving the Union victorious. Morton would report 12 killed and 23 wounded. In addition, Stokes' battery had 3 killed and 10 wounded.

After the battle, Morton supervised the construction of Fortress Rosecrans, doing so until June 1863. Four thousand men were assigned to clear land and build embattlements. Covering 225 acres, these earthworks were the largest fort built during the Civil War.

While Morton and the Pioneer Brigade did not have a large role in the Tullahoma Campaign, their record would be marred by some incidents that occurred, including drunkenness among the ranks. He would also be reprimanded for delaying General Alexander McCook's XX Corps, which got stuck behind the Pioneer Brigade. McCook would personally take this to Rosecrans, who would scold Morton in front of other officers while at his headquarters.

Despite this, Morton was promoted to major in the Regular Army on July 3, 1863.

During the Battle of Chickamauga, the Pioneer Brigade fell into the wrong place again, this time in front of retreating Union troops. Morton had been ordered to survey the front by Rosecrans, and after getting separated from the General, found himself among General McCook's troops, which were to the right of General James Longstreet's breakthrough of the Union lines. Morton and the Pioneer Brigade soon got caught up in the retreat, despite having just been pulled up.

This embarrassment to the army brought about a number of demotions and transfers. Morton, who had been slightly wounded while standing near Rosecrans during the battle, was not immediately relieved of his command. However, on October 10, he was relieved and General William Farrar Smith took his place.

After seeking a transfer, which was denied, Morton requested that he be reduced in rank, from his volunteer rank of brigadier general to his Regular Army rank of major. This may be the only example of a general during the American Civil War voluntary requesting a lower rank. He was mustered out of the volunteer service on November 7, 1863

Returning to Nashville on November 14, he served as the supervising engineer of construction of defenses in the area until January 30, 1864. Following this, he would act as assistant to the chief engineer in Washington until May.

=== IX Corps service ===
Morton returned to the field in May and served as the chief engineer in the IX Corps under General Ambrose Burnside. He fought in the Battle of North Anna and the Battle of Totopotomoy Creek. On June 17, 1864, during the Second Battle of Petersburg, Morton was surveying the area in front of General Orlando B. Willcox's division, which was about to attack, when he was shot in the chest and killed. His body was returned to Philadelphia and he was buried with military honors at Laurel Hill Cemetery.

Following his death, Morton received the following posthumous brevets in the Regular Army:

- Brevet Lieutenant Colonel – for gallant and meritorious services at the Battle of Stones River, Tennessee (January 2, 1863)
- Brevet Colonel – for good conduct at Chickamauga, Georgia (September 20, 1863)
- Brevet Brigadier General – for gallant and meritorious services at the assault on Petersburg, Virginia (June 17, 1864)

== Publications ==
- Letter to the Hon. John B. Floyd, Secretary of War, Presenting for his Consideration A New Plan for the Fortification of Certain Points of the Seacoast of the United States, Washington: William A. Harris, Printer, 1858
- Memoir on the Dangers and Defences of New York City Addressed to the Hon. John B. Floyd, Secretary of War, Washington: William A. Harris, Printer, 1858
- Memoir on American Fortification Submitted to the Hon. John B. Floyd, Secretary of War, Washington: William A. Harris, Printer, 1859
- Memoir of the Life and Services of Capt. and Brevet Major John Sanders, of the Corps of Engineers, U.S. Army, W.S. Haven, 1861
