= London Life =

London Life may refer to:

- London Life (play), 1924 work by Arnold Bennett and Edward Knoblock that was shown at the Drury Lane Theatre, London
- London Life (1960s magazine), a 1960s British magazine edited by Marc Boxer as a revival of Tatler magazine
- London Life (fetish magazine), a fetish magazine published in the early 20th century
- London Life, an unrelated British spanking magazine published briefly in 1977
- A London Life, 1888 novella by Henry James
- London Life Insurance, Canadian insurance company founded in 1874 and merged into Canada Life in 2020
- London Life Association, part of Henderson Group, an investment management company
- Professor Layton's London Life, a 2009 role-playing video game
- Life in London (disambiguation)
