= The Death of General Gordon =

Painting by George William Joy

General Gordon's Last Stand
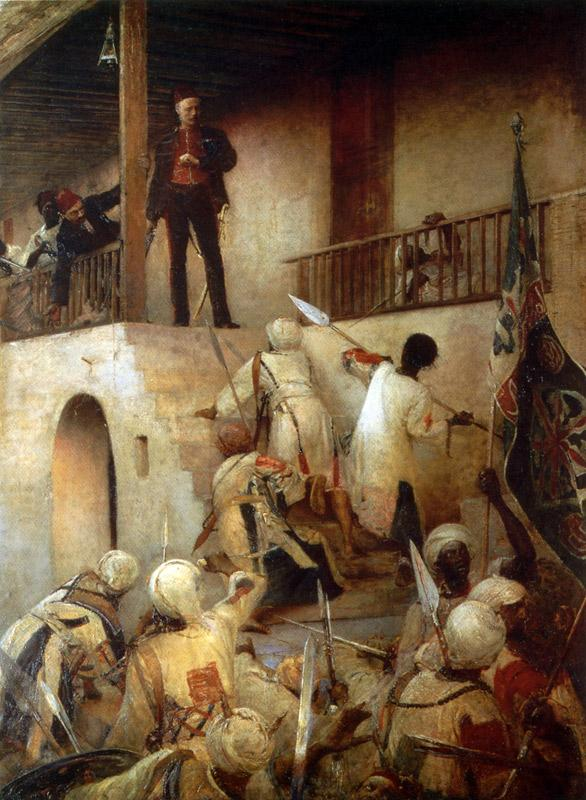
- Artist: George W. Joy
- Year: 1893
- Medium: Oil on canvas
- Dimensions: 236 cm × 175 cm (93 in × 69 in)
- Location: Leeds Art Gallery

The Death of General Gordon, Khartoum, 26th January 1885 or General Gordon's Last Stand is an 1893 oil painting by Irish painter George William Joy.

== History and description ==
The painting depicts the scene of the death of Charles George Gordon in Khartoum in 1885. The event became a cause célèbre in Victorian Britain, as Gordon had asked for the relief of an expeditionary force to assist against the Mahdists which arrived late. His death became associated with a sort of Christian and Imperial understanding of heroism, which is famously reflected in Joy's painting of eight years after. The event also brought calls of revenge in Britain, and served as a part of the justification for the Anglo-Egyptian reconquest of Sudan. The painting's composition reflects the romanticised view of his hero's death. General Gordon is depicted standing nobly and firm at the top of the steps with the Mahdists below.

Joy described the painting as his attempt to "awaken the conscience of the nation". It was completed in 1893 and exhibited at the Royal Academy Exhibition of 1894, accompanied in the catalogue with a quote from Gordon:

Now mark this, if the Expeditionary Force — and I ask for no more than 200 men — does not come in ten days, the town may fall; and I have done my best for the honour of our country

The painting was given to the Leeds Art Gallery in 1920 in whose possession it remains.

== See also ==
- Statue of General Gordon
