= Omnibus Life in London =

Painting by William Maw Egley

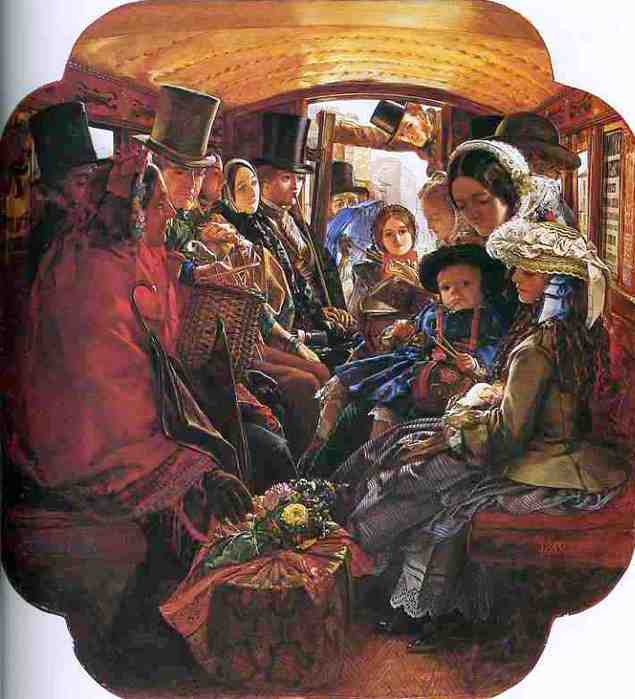
William Maw Egley, Omnibus Life in London, 1859

Omnibus Life in London is an oil-on-canvas painting by British artist William Maw Egley, from 1859. The work depicts the interior of a packed omnibus carriage. It is held by the Tate Gallery, in London.

It is a genre painting, showing a contemporary subject matter in modern dress, as became popular in the Victorian period. Egley's work may be inspired by paintings of cramped railway carriages by French painter Honoré Daumier.

The early omnibus was a horse-drawn carriage drawn along a set route, picking up and dropping off passengers as it went. It was introduced in London on 4 July 1829 and soon became a popular form of transport for the middle classes - the working class would not be able to afford the fare, and upper classes could afford their own vehicle or to hire a hackney carriage. The typical London omnibus was an enclosed and glazed carriage with four wheels, drawn by one or two horses. Passengers could sit on benches to either side inside, entering via a door at the rear, or climb up to exposed seats on the roof. A driver would ride at the front of the carriage, with a conductor assisting passengers to climb aboard or depart and taking fares at the rear.

Egley painted the interior of an omnibus carriage at a coachbuilder's yard in Paddington, showing a view from near the front of the carriage towards the rear door. A view of Westbourne Grove can be seen through the rear windows, near Egley's home at a chemist's shop on the corner of Hereford Road. The scene enables Egley to paint a variety of people crowded into the carriage. The passengers are forced together without regard to their social status and do their best to ignore avoid catching each other's eye. An elderly country woman with piles of luggage looks in concern at the plight of a well-dressed young mother (based on Egley's wife) with two children, who demurely averts her gaze; further back a city clerk sits with his cane. A young woman with parasol and fashionable crinoline is attempting to enter, with the conductor peering in to check if there is any space.

The painting measures 44.8 centimetres (17.6 in) by 41.9 centimetres (16.5 in), and has a distinctive quatrefoil frame. It was exhibited at the British Institution in 1859 and sold to William Jennings for 50 guineas (£52 10s). A version was engraved for the Illustrated London News in 1859. The painting was bequeathed to the Tate Gallery by Jenny Louisa Roberta Blaker in 1947, possibly from the collection of her brother Hugh Blaker (she also donated Modigliani's Le Petit Paysan to the Tate Gallery in 1941, and left The Ugly Duchess by Quentin Matsys to the National Gallery in 1847).

== See also ==
- The Bayswater Omnibus by George W. Joy (1895)

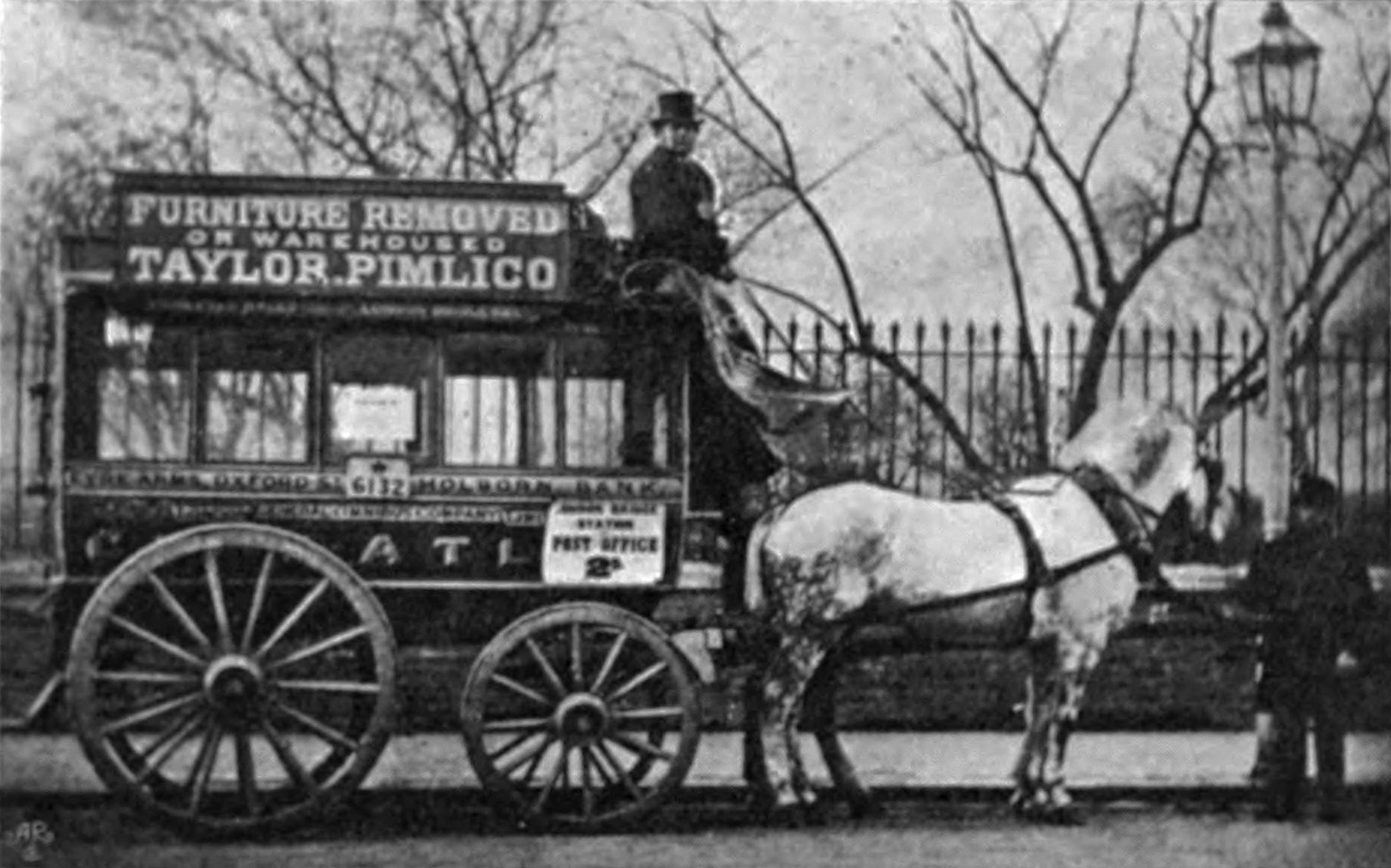
Typical London omnibus, c.1902
