= William Egley =

English painter

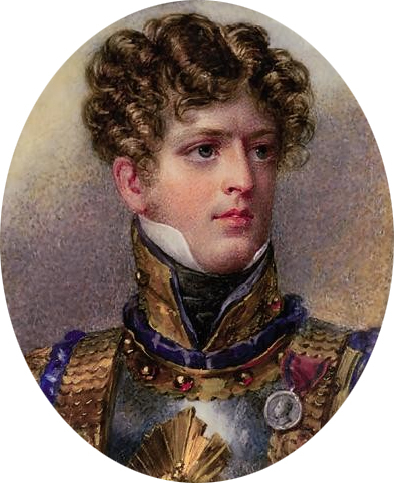
Colonel Sir Horace Beauchamp Seymour (1791–1851) (copy after Isabey, 1840)

William Egley (1798 – 19 March 1870), was an English miniature painter.

== Life and work ==
Egley was born at Doncaster in 1798. Shortly after the boy's birth his father moved to Nottingham, and became confidential agent to the Walkers of Eastwood. The gift of a box of colours which William received in early youth strengthened his desire to be a painter. However, his father wanted both himself and his brother to go into the trade of bookselling.

They went to work at the publishing house and bookshop of William Darton, on Holborn Hill, London; but while Thomas pursued this calling to the end of his life, William, by chance visits to the exhibitions in Somerset House, London cultivated and stimulated his love of painting. Without any professional teaching he succeeded in finishing two pictures, the portraits of Colonel Ogleby and of Richard yates, the actor, which were received and exhibited by the Royal Academy in 1824. From that time until the year before his death he was a constant exhibitor, sending, in all, 160 miniatures to the academy exhibitions, 2 pictures to the British Institution, and 6 to the Suffolk Street Gallery. He was very successful in portraying children, with whom his genial temper made him a great favourite.

Egley died in London on 19 March 1870, aged 72. He was twice married, and by his first wife left a son, William Maw Egley, a painter of historical subjects and a regular exhibitor.
