= Tullahoma campaign =

Military campaign of the American Civil War

Coordinates: 35.3621°N 86.2117°W

- Part of the American Civil War
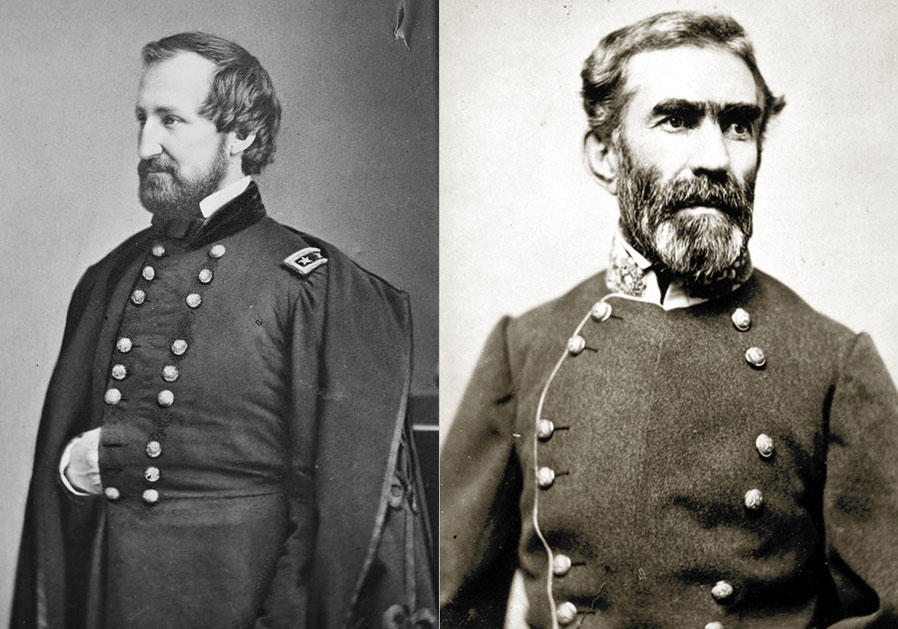
- Commanding generals Rosecrans and Bragg
Date	June 24 – July 3, 1863
Location	Tennessee
Result	Union victory

Belligerents
United States (Union)	(Confederate States of America) CSA (Confederacy)

Commanders and leaders
William Rosecrans	Braxton Bragg

Strength
50,000–60,000	About 45,000

Casualties and losses
569 (83 killed, 473 wounded, and 13 captured or missing)	Total unknown, 1,634 captured

The Tullahoma campaign (or Middle Tennessee campaign) was a military operation conducted from June 24 to July 3, 1863, by the Union Army of the Cumberland under Maj. Gen. William Rosecrans, and is regarded as one of the most brilliant maneuvers of the American Civil War. Its effect was to drive the Confederates out of Middle Tennessee and to threaten the strategic city of Chattanooga.

The Confederate Army of Tennessee under General Braxton Bragg occupied a strong defensive position in the mountains. But through a series of well-rehearsed feints, Rosecrans captured the key passes, helped by the use of the new seven-shot Spencer repeating rifle. The Confederates were handicapped by dissension between generals, as well as a lack of supplies, and soon had to abandon their headquarters at Tullahoma.

The campaign ended in the same week as the two historic Union victories at Gettysburg and Vicksburg, and Rosecrans complained that his achievement was overshadowed. However, Confederate casualties had been few, and Bragg's army soon received reinforcements that enabled it to defeat Rosecrans at the Battle of Chickamauga two months later.

== Background ==
Following the costly but tactically inconclusive Battle of Stones River (December 31, 1862 – January 2, 1863) between Rosecrans and Bragg at Murfreesboro, Tennessee, Bragg withdrew his army about 30 miles to the south, along the Duck River and behind the ridge known as the Highland Rim, which encircles the Nashville Basin. Small groups of pickets protected the passes through the Highland Rim and cavalry protected each flank, a front of almost 70 miles. Bragg, headquartered in Tullahoma, was concerned that Rosecrans would advance to seize the strategic city of Chattanooga, a vital rail junction and the gateway to northern Georgia. His cavalry was spread over such a wide front because he was also concerned at a tactical level that Rosecrans might be able to turn his position, forcing him to retreat or to fight at a disadvantage. Bragg assumed that any attack would be made against his left flank through the easy-to-cross Guy's Gap in the direction of Shelbyville, so he placed his larger infantry corps commanded by Lt. Gen. Leonidas Polk in strong entrenchments at Shelbyville. Eight miles to his right, the corps of Lt. Gen. William J. Hardee was fortified in Wartrace, protecting the main road to Chattanooga and positioned to reinforce the other three passes through the Highland Rim—(from west to east) Bell Buckle Gap, Liberty Gap, and Hoover's Gap. Hoover's Gap was almost undefended; it was a four-mile-long pass between the 1100-foot ridges separating the Stones and Duck Rivers. The pass was so narrow that two wagons could barely pass side by side and was commanded by the surrounding ridges. Strong entrenchments were constructed, but they were manned by only a single cavalry regiment. After the campaign, Bragg was criticized for the inadequate nature of his Tullahoma position. Hardee told him that it was subject to both frontal and flanking attacks.

Rosecrans kept his army in place occupying Murfreesboro for almost six months, spending the time resupplying, building a logistical base (Fortress Rosecrans), and training, but also because he was reluctant to advance on the muddy winter roads. He received numerous entreaties from President Abraham Lincoln, Secretary of War Edwin M. Stanton, and General-in-Chief Henry W. Halleck to resume campaigning against Bragg, but rebuffed them through the winter and spring. A primary concern of the government was that if Rosecrans continued to sit idly, the Confederates might move units from Bragg's army in an attempt to relieve the pressure that Union Maj. Gen. Ulysses S. Grant was applying to Vicksburg, Mississippi. Lincoln wrote to Rosecrans, "I would not push you to any rashness, but I am very anxious that you do your utmost, short of rashness, to keep Bragg from getting lost to help Johnston against Grant." Rosecrans offered the excuse that if he were to start to move against Bragg, then Bragg would likely relocate his entire army to Mississippi and threaten Grant's Vicksburg campaign even more. Thus, by not attacking Bragg, he was helping Grant. Frustration with Rosecrans's excuses led Halleck to threaten to relieve him if he did not move, but in the end he merely protested "against the expense to which [Rosecrans] put the government for telegrams."

Bragg's army suffered from the delays. The area his troops occupied, known as the Barrens, was a zone of poor farmland that made it difficult for him to obtain subsistence for his army while he waited for Rosecrans to attack him. Ironically, though the Confederates were stationed for the protection of agricultural supplies of the South moving by rail through Chattanooga, they were close to starving while large portions of those agricultural supplies were shipped east to General Robert E. Lee's Army of Northern Virginia.

Bragg's subordinate generals were nearly mutinous in expressing their dissatisfaction with Bragg's command during his Kentucky campaign (Battle of Perryville) and Stones River. Confederate President Jefferson Davis responded to the complaints by dispatching Gen. Joseph E. Johnston to investigate the condition of the army. Davis assumed that Johnston, Bragg's superior, would find the situation wanting and take command of the army in the field, easing Bragg aside. However, Johnston arrived on the scene and found the men of the Army of Tennessee in relatively good condition. He told Bragg that he had "the best organized, armed, equipped, and disciplined army in the Confederacy." Johnston explicitly refused any suggestion that he take command, concerned that people would think he had taken advantage of the situation for his own personal gain. When Davis ordered Johnston to send Bragg to Richmond, Johnston delayed because of Mrs. Elise Bragg's illness. When her health improved, Johnston was unable to assume command because of lingering medical problems from his wound at the Battle of Seven Pines in 1862.

During the winter and spring, both sides occupied themselves with their favorite—and generally profitless—practice of sending cavalry on raids. Almost a third of Bragg's army consisted of cavalry—16,000 effectives versus about 9,000 Union. In a February raid against Fort Donelson (the Battle of Dover) Confederate Maj. Gen. Joseph Wheeler, commanding two brigades of cavalry, failed to capture the garrison in Dover, Tennessee or disrupt Union shipping on the Cumberland River. In March, Rosecrans sent a detachment to cut Bragg's communications, but it was forced to surrender in the Battle of Thompson's Station. Also in March, Confederate Brig. Gen. Nathan Bedford Forrest raided Rosecrans's communications at Brentwood, a station on the Nashville & Decatur Railroad, in the Battle of Brentwood. When Johnston brought Confederate Maj. Gen. Earl Van Dorn into the Army of Tennessee's area of operation, Van Dorn was unsure of his mission, of where he was supposed to take position, and of who would serve under him. He was unsuccessful in cutting Rosecrans's communications between February and May, with raids that included two minor cavalry fights north of Spring Hill in March, and Forrest's pursuit and capture of Col. Abel Streight in Streight's Raid in Alabama in April. In May, Van Dorn was murdered and Forrest assumed command of the cavalry on Bragg's left flank; most of Van Dorn's Mississippi troopers were transferred back to their home state in May. The Confederates lost 4,000 cavalrymen during this period but did cause Rosecrans some concern over his supply lines. The Union lost 3,300 men and received little in return.

On June 2, Halleck telegraphed that if Rosecrans was unwilling to move, some of his troops would be sent to Mississippi to reinforce Grant, who by then was besieging Vicksburg, but was potentially threatened by the army of Joseph E. Johnston in his rear. Rosecrans sent a questionnaire to his corps and division commanders in the hopes of documenting support for his position—that Bragg had so far detached no significant forces to Johnston in Mississippi, that advancing the Army of the Cumberland would do nothing to prevent any such transfer, and that any immediate advance was not a good idea. Fifteen of the seventeen senior generals supported most of Rosecrans's positions and the counsel against advancing was unanimous. The only dissenter was the newly assigned chief of staff, Brig. Gen. James A. Garfield, who recommended an immediate advance.

Meanwhile, Brig. Gen. John Hunt Morgan's Confederate cavalry brigade had been detached from Bragg's army, and was, at this time, moving north in preparation of the imminent launch of his famous Great Raid into Kentucky, Indiana and Ohio - an operation that cavalry historian Stephen Z. Starr called "militarily insane", and that would ultimately end in Morgan's capture.

On June 16, Halleck wired a blunt message: "Is it your intention to make an immediate movement forward? A definite answer, yes or no, is required." Rosecrans responded to this ultimatum: "If immediate means tonight or tomorrow, no. If it means as soon as all things are ready, say five days, yes." Seven days later, early in the morning of June 24, Rosecrans reported that the Army of the Cumberland had begun to move against Bragg.

== Opposing forces ==
=== Union ===
The Union Army of the Cumberland, commanded by Rosecrans, began campaigning with 50–60,000 men, (Note: Strength figures vary widely in different accounts. Hallock, p. 15: 82,000; Eicher, p. 496: 56,000; Esposito, map 108: 64,000; Korn, p. 21: 70,000; Lamers, p. 275: 50,017.) composed of the following major organizations:

- XIV Corps, commanded by Maj. Gen. George H. Thomas, 26,058 present for duty with division commanders Maj. Gen. Lovell H. Rousseau, Maj. Gen. James S. Negley, Brig. Gen. John M. Brannan, and Maj. Gen. Joseph J. Reynolds.
- XX Corps, commanded by Maj. Gen. Alexander McD. McCook, 16,047 present with division commanders Brig. Gen. Jefferson C. Davis, Brig. Gen. Richard W. Johnson, and Maj. Gen. Philip H. Sheridan.
- XXI Corps, commanded by Maj. Gen. Thomas L. Crittenden, 17,023 present with division commanders Brig. Gen. Thomas J. Wood, Maj. Gen. John M. Palmer, and Brig. Gen. Horatio P. Van Cleve.
- Reserve Corps, commanded by Maj. Gen. Gordon Granger, 20,615 present with division commanders Brig. Gen. Absalom Baird, Brig. Gen. James D. Morgan, and Brig. Gen. Robert S. Granger.
- Cavalry Corps, commanded by Maj. Gen. David S. Stanley, 12,281 present with division commanders Brig. Gen. Robert B. Mitchell, and Brig. Gen. John B. Turchin.

=== Confederate ===
The Confederate Army of Tennessee, commanded by Bragg, with about 45,000 men, (Note: Strength figures vary in different accounts. Hallock, p. 15: 55,000; Connelly, p. 116: 38,000 effectives; Eicher, p. 496: 44,000; Esposito, map 108: 44,000; Korn, p. 21: 40,000; Lamers, p. 275: 46,665; Official Records, Series I, Vol. XXIII, Part 1, p. 585: 43,089 "effective total present".) was composed of the following major organizations:

- Polk's Corps, commanded by Lt. Gen. Leonidas Polk, 14,260 effective total present.
- Hardee's Corps, commanded by Lt. Gen. William J. Hardee, 14,949 effective total present.
- Wheeler's Cavalry Corps, commanded by Maj. Gen. Joseph Wheeler, 8967 effective total present.
- Forrest's Cavalry Division, commanded by Brig. Gen. Nathan B. Forrest, 4107 effective total present.

== Campaign ==
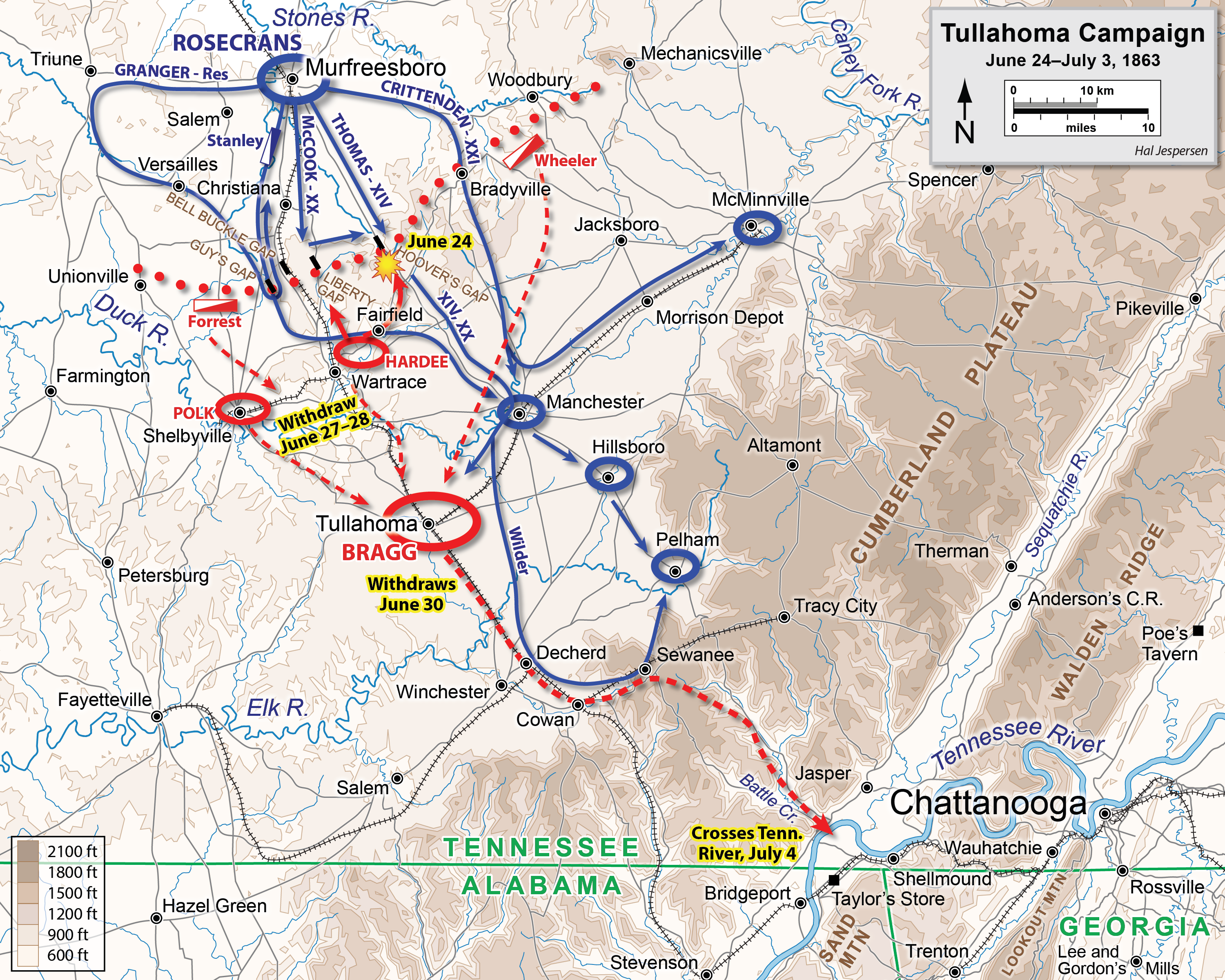
Tullahoma campaign Confederate Union

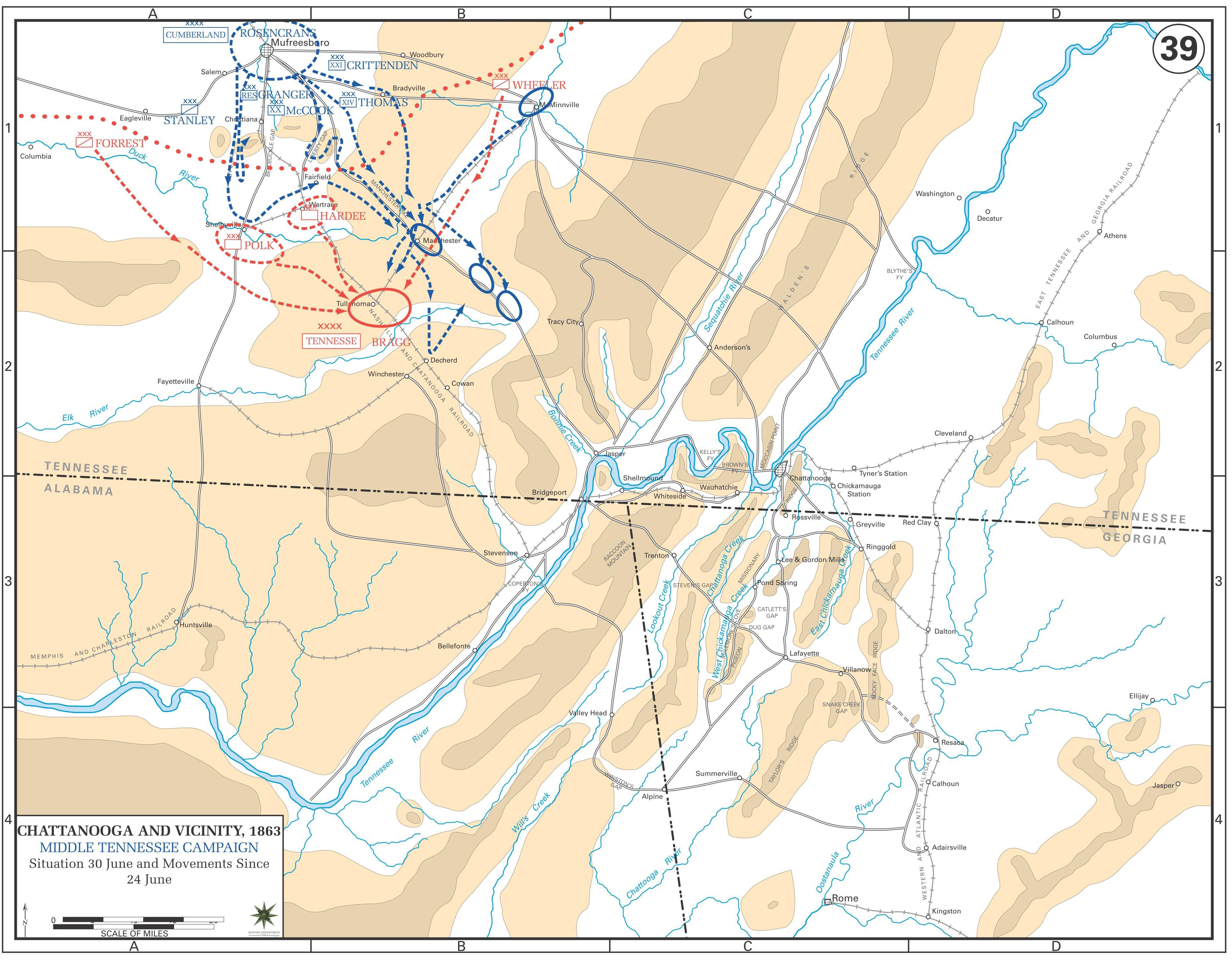
Tullahoma campaign (additional map)

The first movements of the campaign had actually begun on June 23 when elements of the Reserve Corps under Granger, with a cavalry division under Mitchell, moved due west from Murfreesboro to Triune to begin an elaborate feint. (Note: The scope of the campaign is described differently by different sources. Frisby, p. 1980, cites January–August 1863, but on p. 1981, June 24 – September 9. Eicher, p. 496, describes a "weeklong" campaign starting on June 23. Esposito, text for map 108, describes a nine-day campaigns starting on June 24, but includes Tullahoma as part of an overall Chickamauga Campaign. The National Park Service equates the Battle of Hoover's Gap and the Tullahoma or Middle Tennessee campaign, but also defines five battles from February through April, preceding Hoover's Gap, as the Middle Tennessee Operations campaign. Woodworth, p. 42, describes the period of June 24 through July 3, but quotes Rosecrans as calling it a nine-day campaign. Hallock, p. 7, cites June 23 through July 3.) This was designed to play into Bragg's assumption that the main attack would come on his left flank in the direction of Shelbyville. At the same time, the XXI Corps division of John Palmer moved to Bradyville, well beyond the Confederate right flank, where he could push back Confederate cavalry and move in the direction of Manchester, getting into the Confederate rear. It was only after these movements were under way that Rosecrans brought his corps commanders together to hear the detailed orders for the upcoming campaign.

Rosecrans's elaborate plan, which would test the extensive training program he had spent the six months conducting, was to slide Granger's corps to the left, covering the Shelbyville approaches, and perform a giant right wheel of the army. While Bragg's attention was focused on the strongly fortified Shelbyville, Thomas's corps would march southeast on the Manchester Pike, headed for Hoover's Gap on Hardee's right flank. Since the gap was lightly manned, speed was of the essence to Rosecrans's plan.

During the spring, Rosecrans had repeatedly asked for more cavalry resources, which were denied by Washington, but he did receive permission to outfit an infantry brigade as a mounted unit. Col. John T. Wilder's brigade of Reynolds's division—1,500 men of the 17th and 72nd Indiana regiments and the 98th and 123rd Illinois—found horses and mules in the countryside and armed themselves with long handled hatchets for hand-to-hand combat, which caused their unit to be derisively nicknamed the "Hatchet Brigade". Their more lethal armament were the seven-shot Spencer repeating rifles carried by all the men. Wilder's brigade had the mobility and firepower, but also the high unit morale, necessary to lead the surprise advance on Hoover's Gap before it could be reinforced.

Our regiment lay on the hill side in mud and water, the rain pouring down in torrents, while each shell screamed so close to us as to make it seem that the next would tear us to pieces. Presently the enemy got near enough to us to make a charge on our battery, and on they came; our men are on their feet in an instant and a terrible fire from the "Spencers" causes the advancing regiment to reel and its colors fall to the ground, but in an instant their colors are up again and on they come, thinking to reach the battery before our guns can be reloaded, but they "reckoned without their host," they didn't know we had the "Spencers," and their charging yell was answered by another terrible volley, and another and another without cessation, until the poor regiment was literally cut to pieces, and but few men of that 20th Tennessee that attempted the charge will ever charge again. - Major James A. Connolly, Wilder's Brigade

Wilder's brigade was successful in racing toward Hoover's Gap and capturing it on the first day of battle, which led to his unit's subsequent nickname, the Lightning Brigade. Their opponents, the 1st Kentucky Cavalry, skirmished briefly and withdrew under pressure, but were unable to reach the gap before the better-fed horses of the Lightning Brigade. The Kentuckians fell apart as a unit and failed in their cavalry mission to provide intelligence of the Union movement to their higher headquarters. Although Wilder's main infantry support was well behind his mounted brigade, he determined to continue pushing through the Gap and hold it before the Confederate reinforcements could arrive. The Confederate brigade of Brig. Gen. William B. Bate, supported by Brig. Gen. Bushrod Johnson's brigade and some artillery, assaulted Wilder's position, but was driven back by the concentrated fire of the Spencers, losing 146 killed and wounded (almost a quarter of his force) to Wilder's 61. Wilder's brigade held the Gap until the main infantry units of the XIV Corps arrived to secure the position against any further assaults. The corps commander, General Thomas, shook Wilder's hand and told him, "You have saved the lives of a thousand men by your gallant conduct today. I didn't expect to get to this gap for three days."

At Liberty Gap, 6 miles to the west, a similar battle occurred. The leading elements of McCook's advance was the 39th Indiana, commanded by Col. Thomas J. Harrison, which was also mounted and armed with Spencer rifles. Taking a few prisoners of the Confederate pickets that opposed them, they found that there were only two Confederate regiments in the Gap. Not waiting for the main infantry support to arrive, McCook ordered the brigade of Brig. Gen. August Willich to move forward as quickly as possible. Deploying a regiment on each side of the road, Willich's men drove up the slope. A frontal assault against the breastworks was not feasible, so a fierce battle of flanking maneuvers resulted against the Confederate brigades of Brig. Gens. St. John R. Liddell and S.A.M. Wood. As a second Union brigade arrived in the evening to support Willich, the Union troops had pushed a half mile beyond the southern entrance to the Gap.

The first day of the campaign had been conducted in heavy rain, a weather pattern that would persist for 17 days. (Union soldiers spread the humorous rumor during the campaign that the name Tullahoma was a combination of the Greek words "tulla", meaning "mud", and "homa", meaning "more mud".) This slowed the Union advances, but the day was marked by the Army of the Cumberland's "absolutely flawless execution of Rosecrans's plan." The Union army possessed two key passes in the Highland Rim and was in position to turn Bragg's right flank.

On June 25, Bate and Johnson renewed their attempts to drive the Union men out of Hoover's Gap, while Cleburne did the same at Liberty Gap. Both were unsuccessful, although Cleburne pushed back Willich for a time, causing 20% casualties in the 77th Pennsylvania, until reinforcements arrived. Rosecrans brought the forward movement of the Army of the Cumberland to a halt as the roads had become quagmires. But during this lull, Bragg took no effective action to counter Rosecrans because his cavalry commanders were not relaying intelligence to him reliably—Forrest was not informing of the weak nature of the Union right flank attack and Wheeler failed to report the movement of Crittenden's corps through Bradyville and toward Bragg's rear.

Bragg became aware on June 26 of the significant fighting on his right flank and that the actions on his left were a feint. He ordered Polk to take his corps on a night march toward Murfreesboro through Guy's Gap and attack the Union force at Liberty Gap from the rear, while Hardee pressed them in front. Polk objected to the difficulty of the assignment and Bragg eventually called off the attack as he came to realize the threat from Thomas. Meanwhile, Rosecrans ordered McCook to withdraw from Liberty Gap to the north, skirt around the upper reaches of the Highland Rim, and exploit Thomas's breakout at Hoover's Gap.

Hardee also contributed to Bragg's difficulties. The mistrust among the general officers of the Army of Tennessee for the past months led to little direct communication about strategy and neither Polk nor Hardee had a firm understanding of Bragg's plans. Hardee complained about the unsuitability of the Tullahoma position, but rather than assuming that Bragg and Joseph E. Johnston understood the strategic situation and that he had insufficient knowledge of their plans, as historian Steven E. Woodworth described it, "He simply took the situation as further proof of his long-held notion that Bragg was an idiot" and pursued the course "he deemed best for saving an army whose commander was an idiot." That course was to order his force under Maj. Gen Alexander P. Stewart at Hoover's Gap to retreat towards Wartrace. If he had withdrawn in the direction of Manchester, he might have used the successive defensive positions along that route to delay Rosecrans enough for Bragg to implement a successful counterattack, but he simply made Thomas's breakout more effective, leaving Bragg with no alternatives than to order Polk and Hardee to withdraw to Tullahoma on June 27.

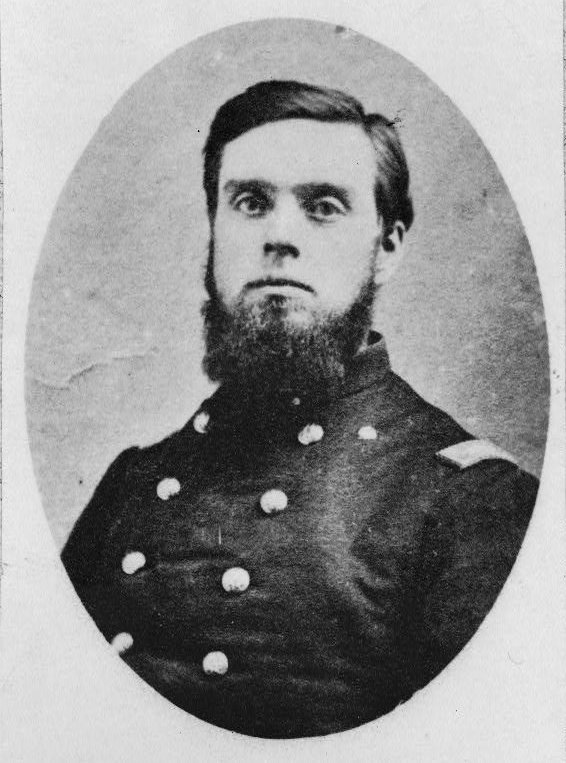
John T. Wilder

Wilder's Brigade reached Manchester at 8 a.m. on June 27 and occupied the town by noon. Rousseau and Brannon pushed their divisions toward Wartrace as Stewart withdrew. In the west, Granger and Stanley, still demonstrating before Guy's Gap, received orders to attempt to move forward. Stanley's cavalry easily pushed aside their Confederate counterparts and approached the breastworks at Shelbyville, now mostly abandoned after Polk's withdrawal. Some resistance remained and Col. Robert H. G. Minty personally led his "Saber Brigade" of Michigan cavalrymen in a mounted charge over the breastworks after the retreating Confederates.

On June 28, Wilder's brigade left on a raid to damage the railroad infrastructure in Bragg's rear, heading south toward Decherd, a small town on the Nashville & Chattanooga Railroad. The rain-swollen Elk River proved a significant obstacle, but they disassembled a nearby mill and constructed a raft to float their howitzers across. They defeated a small garrison of Confederates in Decherd, tore up 300 yards of track and burned the railroad depot filled with Confederate rations. The next morning they rode into the foothills of the Cumberland Mountains, reaching the town of Sewanee, the place Leonidas Polk had selected a few years before as the future site of the University of the South, where they destroyed a branch rail line. Although pursued by a larger Confederate force, the Lightning Brigade was back in Manchester by noon, June 30. They had not lost a single man on their raid.

Bragg was not overly concerned by the raid in his rear area and the damage to the railroad was repaired quickly. His men waited in their Tullahoma fortifications for a frontal assault that Rosecrans planned for July 1. However, Polk was overly concerned about the fate of the army with its communications cut off—even temporarily—and counseled Bragg to retreat. Hardee, who had no faith in Bragg, refused to specifically recommend a retreat, but offered no encouragement to stay and fight. A day later, at 3 p.m. on June 30, Bragg issued orders for a nighttime withdrawal across the Elk. By leaving before the Union assault, Bragg gave up an opportunity to inflict potentially serious damage on the Army of the Cumberland.

The Army of Tennessee took up positions below the Elk River, but Hardee and Polk convinced Bragg to move farther south, to the town of Cowan. Steven Woodworth wrote that "The resolute and well-conceived Union advance and the constant carping and noncooperation of his generals seemed to have broken Bragg down physically and emotionally" and he suffered from a collection of physical ailments, including a painful case of boils that prevented him from mounting his horse to survey the battle lines. The Cowan position was not well defensible and the army remained there only until the evening of July 2. Without consulting his corps commanders, on July 3 Bragg ordered a retreat to Chattanooga. The army crossed the Tennessee River on July 4; a cavalry pursuit under Phil Sheridan was not successful in trapping the rear guard of Bragg's army before they crossed the river. All the Confederate units had encamped near Lookout Mountain by July 7.

== Aftermath ==
Thus ended a nine days' campaign, which drove the enemy from two fortified positions and gave us possession of Middle Tennessee, conducted in one of the most extraordinary rains ever known in Tennessee at that period of the year.

— Maj. Gen. William Rosecrans

Tullahoma is considered a "brilliant" campaign by many historians. (Note: For example: Lamers, p. 290; Woodworth, p. 42; Korn, p. 30, "a model of planning and execution".) Abraham Lincoln wrote, "The flanking of Bragg at Shelbyville, Tullahoma and Chattanooga is the most splendid piece of strategy I know of." Union Cavalry Corps commander David Stanley wrote, "If any student of the military art desires to make a study of a model campaign, let him take his maps and General Rosecrans's orders for the daily movements of his campaign. No better example of successful strategy was carried out during the war than in the Tullahoma campaign." The Union Army had driven the Confederates out of Middle Tennessee with minimal losses. Union casualties were reported as 569 (83 killed, 473 wounded, and 13 captured or missing). Bragg made no casualty report; his losses, he said, were "trifling." But the Union army captured 1,634 Confederates, primarily from Hardee's Corps. As Bragg rode into the Tennessee mountains he told Bishop Charles Quintard, the chaplain of the 1st Tennessee, that he was "utterly broken down" and that the campaign was "a great disaster".

Rosecrans did not receive all of the public acclaim his campaign might have under different circumstances. The day it ended was the day Robert E. Lee launched Pickett's Charge and lost the Battle of Gettysburg. The following day, Vicksburg surrendered to Grant. Secretary of War Stanton telegraphed Rosecrans, "Lee's Army overthrown; Grant victorious. You and your noble army now have a chance to give the finishing blow to the rebellion. Will you neglect the chance?" Rosecrans was infuriated by this attitude and responded, "Just received your cheering telegram announcing the fall of Vicksburg and confirming the defeat of Lee. You do not appear to observe the fact that this noble army has driven the rebels from middle Tennessee. ... I beg in behalf of this army that the War Department may not overlook so great an event because it is not written in letters of blood."

Rosecrans did not immediately pursue Bragg and "give the finishing blow to the rebellion" as Stanton urged. He paused to regroup and study the difficult choices of pursuit into mountainous regions. When the campaigning resumed, Bragg's army proved to be only temporarily defeated. Reinforced with additional troops from Lee's Virginia army, Bragg attacked Rosecrans at the Battle of Chickamauga in September and won the only significant Confederate victory in the Western Theater of the war, driving Rosecrans back to Chattanooga and besieging him there.
