= George W. Joy =

British painter

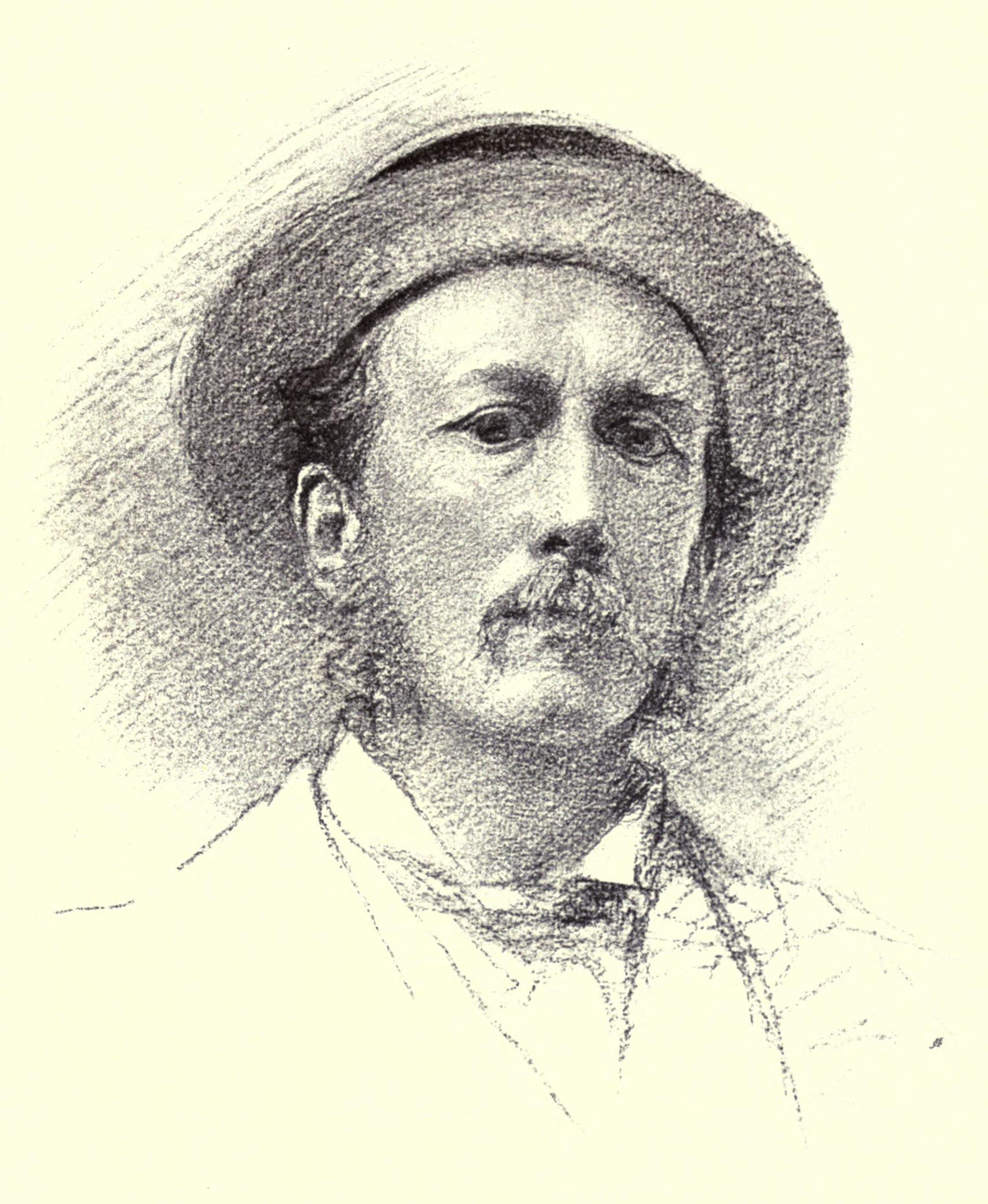
- Self-portrait, 1900
- Born: 7 July 1844; Dublin, Ireland
- Died: 28 October 1925 (aged 82); Purbrook, Hampshire, England
- Education: Harrow School; South Kensington School of Art, London
- Known for: Painter of genre, historical scenes and Orientalist themes
- Movement: Orientalist

George William Joy (7 July 1844 in Dublin, Ireland – 28 October 1925 in Purbrook, Hampshire) was an Irish painter in London.

== Life and career ==
Joy was the son of William Bruce Joy, MD, and the brother of sculptor Albert Bruce-Joy, descendants of an old Huguenot family which settled in County Antrim in 1612.

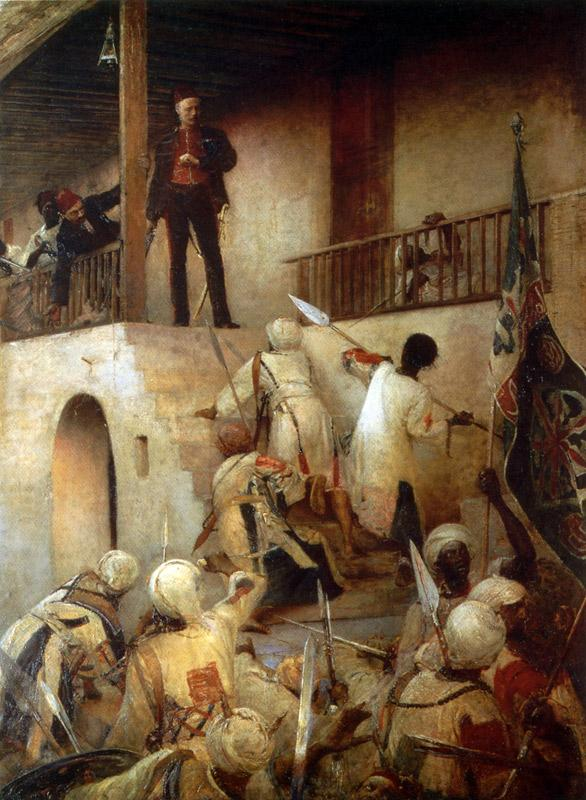
General Gordon's Last Stand. Joy's portrayal of Gordon's death

He was initially destined for the military and was also an accomplished violin player. After a foot injury at young age, his father declared him unfit for military service. Joy was then educated at Harrow School and eventually pursued a career as an artist. He studied in London's South Kensington School of Art and later at the Royal Academy under John Everett Millais, Frederic Leighton and George Frederic Watts; among his fellow students was Hubert von Herkomer.

In 1868 Joy went to Paris where for two years he was a student of Charles-François Jalabert and Léon Bonnat. There he met masters like Gérôme, Cabanel, Jules Breton, Jules Lefebvre und Philippe Rousseau.

Going back to London, Joy established himself as a history and genre painter, and became a frequent exhibitor at the Royal Academy, the Salon des artistes français and the Royal Hibernian Academy. He became a member of the Royal Institute of Oil Painters in 1895.

To satisfy his early military ambitions, Joy entered the Artists Rifles where he was known as a good shot, representing Ireland several times. He spent many winters in Swanage from 1896 and eventually retired to Purbrook. Both of his sons were killed in 1915 during World War I.

== Works ==
Joy's paintings covered a variety of themes from strictly historical to religious and allegorical. He also painted portraits.

His pursuit of the perfect female form in nude paintings like Laodamia (1878; Portsmouth City Museum), The Danaids (1887) and Truth (1892-93) are unusually bold for England and refer back to the French classicist tradition of Ingres and Girodet-Trioson.

Opposing home rule for Ireland and advocating the unity of the British Isles, Joy painted several patriotic images with allegories like Rose, Shamrock and Thistle (1889) and The First Union Jack (1892) as well as historic examples of rebellions like Flora MacDonald's Farewell to Prince Charlie and The King's Drum Shall Never be Beaten for Rebels, 1798 (1891; Bournemouth, Russell-Cotes Art Gallery and Museum).

He was perhaps best known for his depiction of heroism in a painting entitled The Death of General Gordon, Khartoum, 26 January 1885 (1893; Leeds City Museum). Picturing a final moment in the very recent British history of the Siege of Khartoum, Gordon is pictured bravely facing his fate in the Governor-General's Palace, Khartoum, standing above the followers of the invading Mahdi army moments before being struck down by a spear.

Another different work by Joy is the highly contemporary scene The Bayswater Omnibus (1895; Museum of London - image here).

One of his most evocative paintings is Joan of Arc, guarded in her sleep by an angel (1895; Rouen, Musée des Beaux Arts - image here).

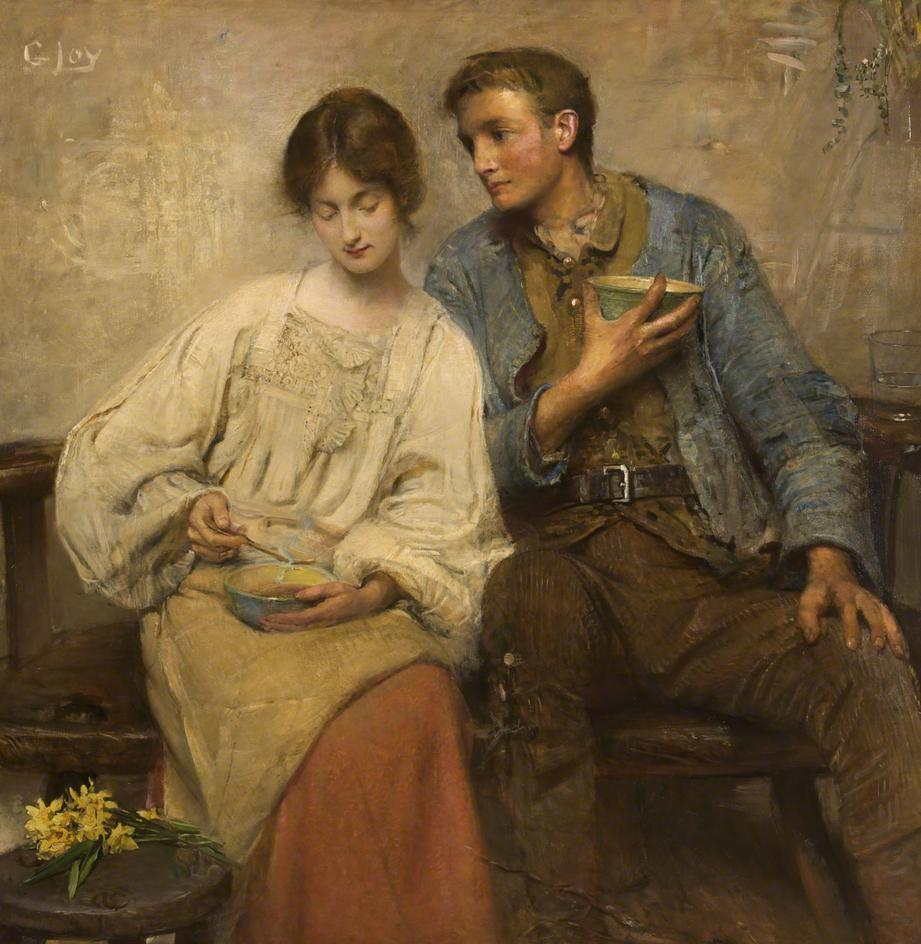
A dinner of herbs

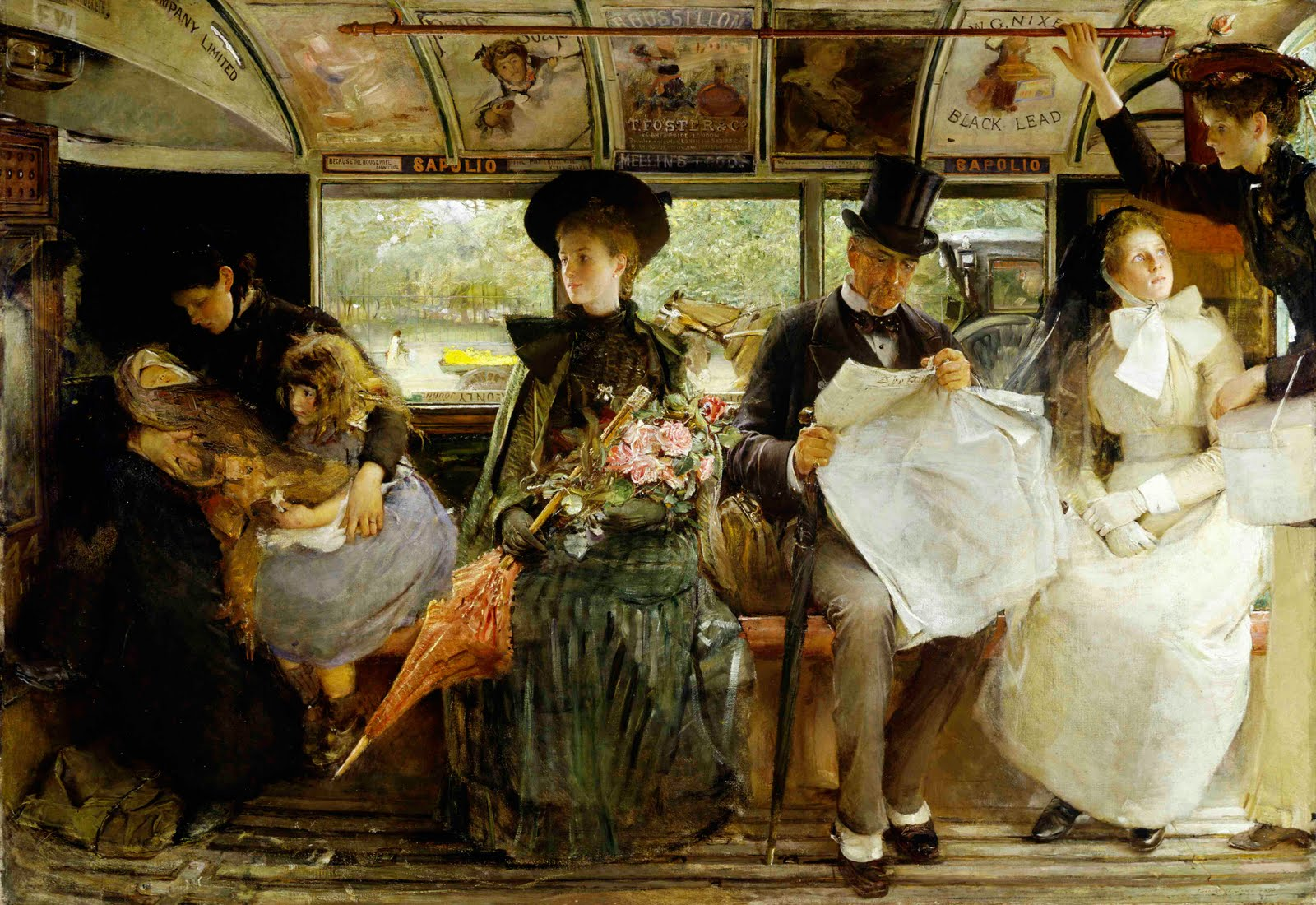
The Bayswater Omnibus

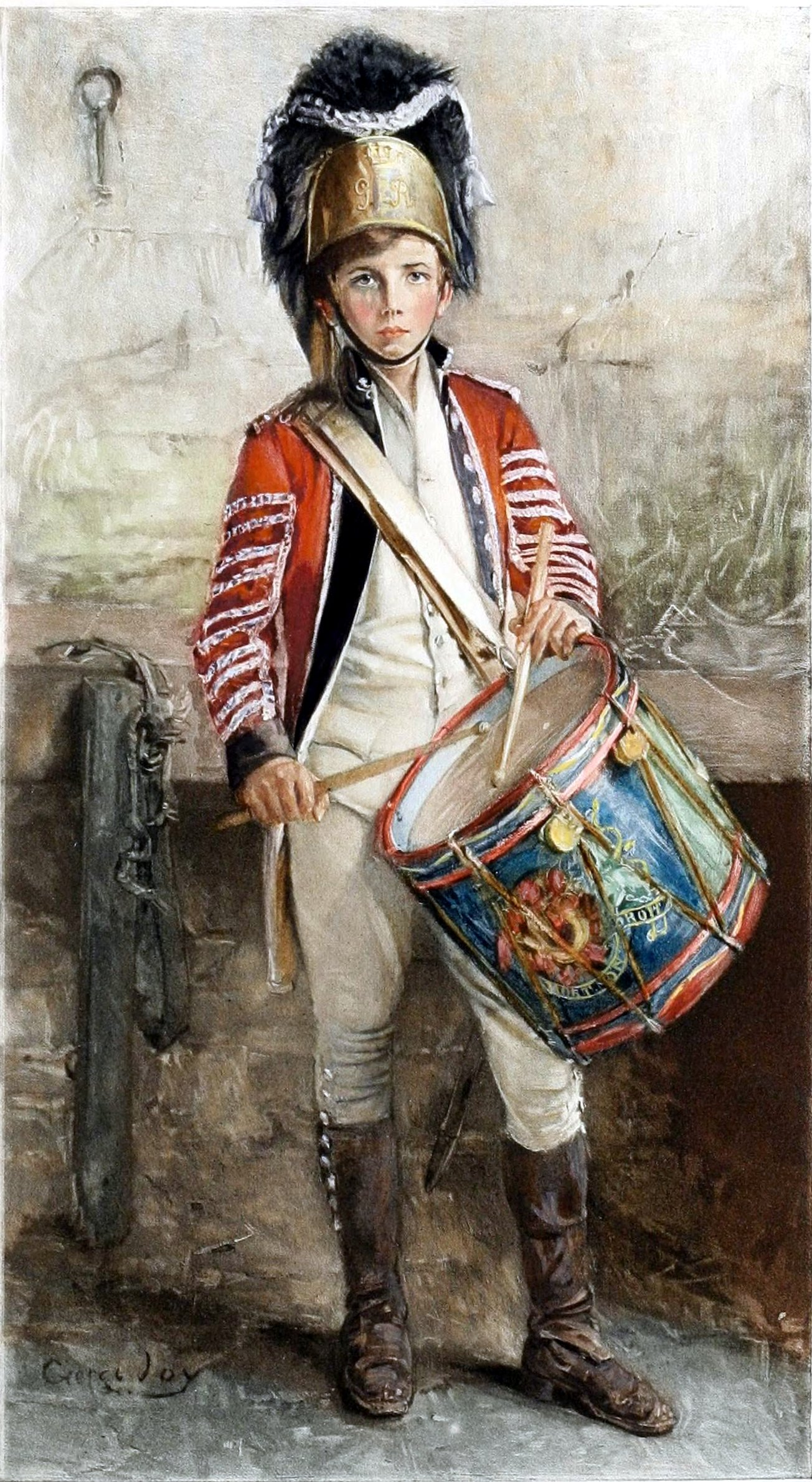
An English Drummer Boy (1902)
