= James S. Negley =

American Civil War general, farmer, railroader and politician (1826–1901)

James Scott Negley
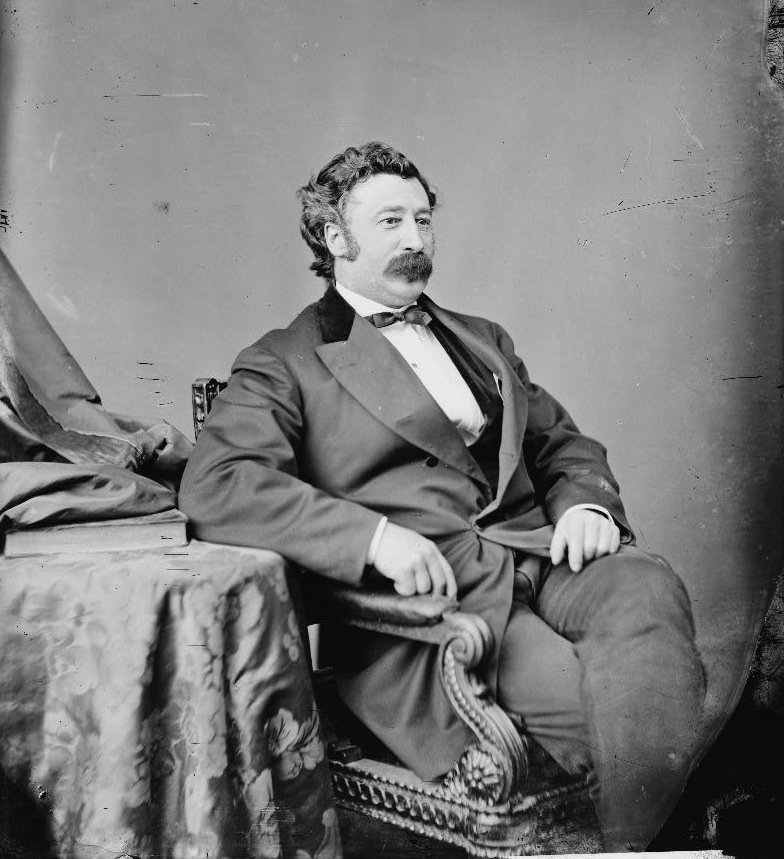
- Born: December 22, 1826; Pittsburgh, Pennsylvania
- Died: August 7, 1901 (aged 74); Plainfield, New Jersey
- Burial place: Allegheny Cemetery, Pittsburgh, Pennsylvania
- Alma mater: University of Pittsburgh
- Military career
- Allegiance: United States of America; Union
- Branch: United States Army; Union Army
- Service years: 1846–1848, 1861–1865
- Rank: Major General
- Conflicts: Mexican-American War; American Civil War

Signature
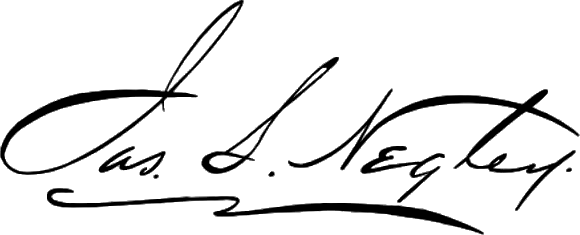

James Scott Negley (December 22, 1826 – August 7, 1901) was an American Civil War General, farmer, railroader, and U.S. representative from Pennsylvania. He played a key role in the Union victory at the Battle of Stones River.

== Early life ==
Negley was born in Pittsburgh, Pennsylvania, the son of Jacob Negley and Mary Ann Scott. His aunt Sarah married Thomas Mellon. He was educated in public schools and graduated from the University of Pittsburgh (then the Western University of Pennsylvania). He served in a volunteer regiment, Company K of the Duquesne Greys, 1st Pennsylvania Volunteers, during the Mexican–American War. After the war, he became a farmer and horticulturist.

== Civil War ==
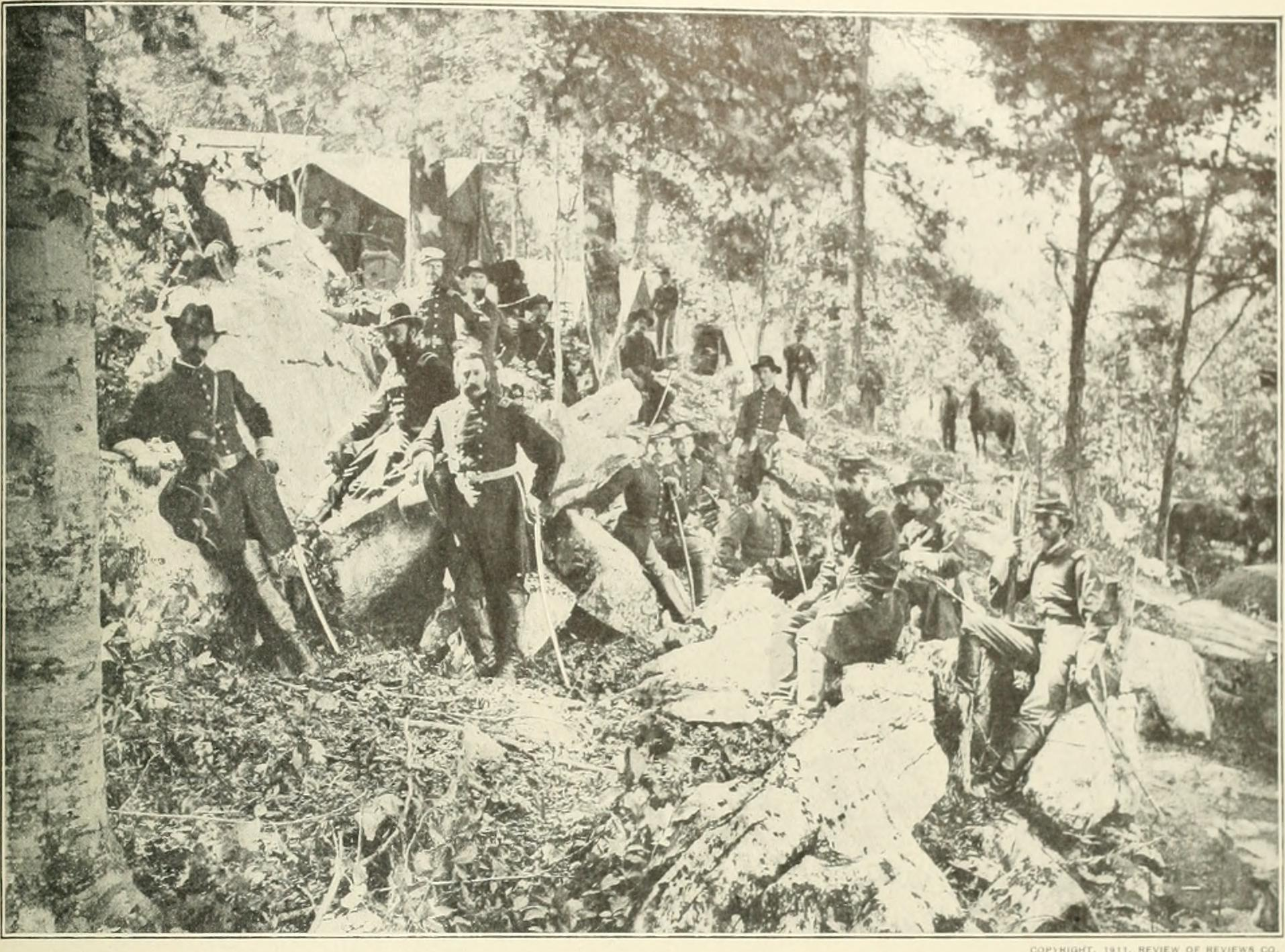
General James S. Negley (standing uncovered) and Staff during the Battle of Lookout Mountain

On April 19, 1861, Negley was appointed brigadier general in the Pennsylvania Militia. He raised a brigade of Pennsylvania volunteers and served under Robert Patterson in the Shenandoah Valley in 1861. His appointment as brigadier general expired on July 20, but he was reappointed brigadier general of volunteers on October 1, 1861. In October, he was placed in command of the 7th Brigade in the Department of the Ohio. He commanded the Union expedition (raid) against Chattanooga during the Confederate Heartland Offensive. The expedition proved to be a successful demonstration of the Union Army's ability to strike deep into the heart of Confederate-held territory.

On November 29, 1862, he was appointed major general of volunteers and took command of the 8th Division in the Army of the Ohio. His division became the 2nd Division in George H. Thomas' Center Wing of the XIV Corps during the Battle of Stones River. On the second day of fighting, he led a successful counterattack against Maj. Gen. John C. Breckinridge on the Union left flank. He commanded his division during the Tullahoma Campaign and the Battle of Chickamauga. During the maneuvering that preceded the Battle of Chickamauga, Negley's division, in the advance of Maj. Gen. George H. Thomas's corps, was almost trapped in a cul-de-sac named McLemore's Cove, but command confusion in the Confederate Army of Tennessee allowed them to escape in what became known as the Battle of Davis' Crossroads. After the Union defeat at Chickamauga, Negley, whose division became scattered during the second day's fighting, was relieved of command, but was acquitted of any wrongdoing during the battle. The most recent study of his actions is highly critical to the general for vanishing from sight without anyone knowing where to find him. Negley, however, blamed his misfortunes on the prejudices toward him of West Point graduates. When Ulysses S. Grant became general-in-chief in 1864 he discussed restoring Negley to command. However, after serving on several administrative boards, Negley resigned in January 1865.

Fort Negley, built in Nashville, Tennessee in 1862 was named after him. It was the largest stone inland fort built during the war.

== Postbellum career ==
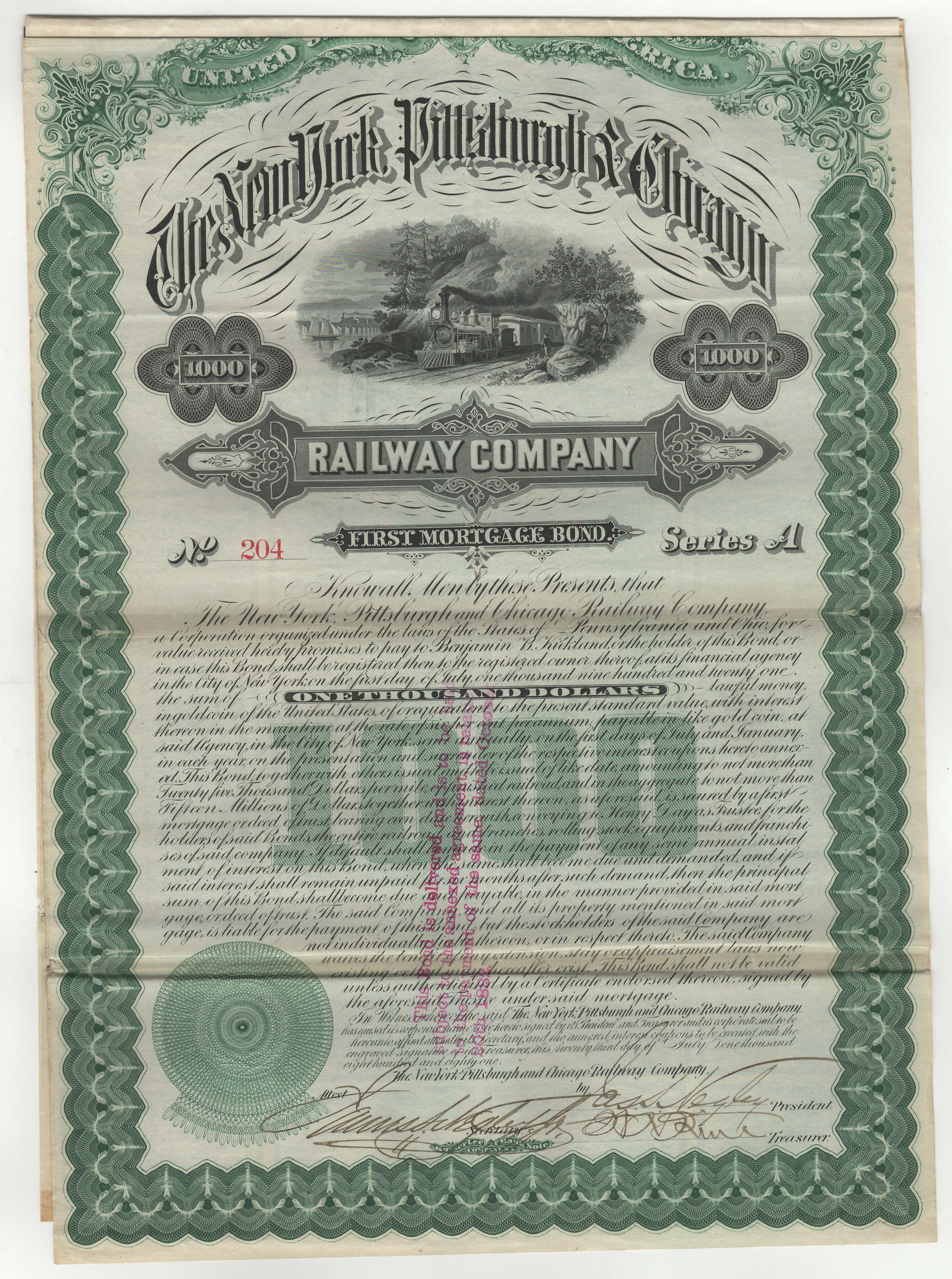
Bond of the New York, Pittsburgh & Chicago Company, issued 23 July 1881, signed by President Negley

After the war, Negley was elected as a Republican to the United States Congress in 1868 and served from 1869 to 1875. In 1877, during the Pittsburgh Railway Riots, Negley served as commander of the militia organized by the city of Pittsburgh to maintain order in the city.

He served on the board of managers of the National Home for Disabled Volunteer Soldiers from 1874 to 1878 and from 1882 to 1888. He was re-elected to Congress in 1884 and served from 1885 to 1887. After retiring from politics, he was engaged in the railroad industry. The community of Negley, Ohio bears his name after being founded by the New York, Pittsburgh & Chicago Railway line. In 1897, he became a Veteran Companion of the Pennsylvania Commandery of the Military Order of Foreign Wars.

Negley died in Plainfield, New Jersey, aged 74. He is buried in the Allegheny Cemetery in Pittsburgh.

The famous twentieth century foreign correspondent Negley Farson was a relative and namesake of the general.

== See also ==
- List of American Civil War generals (Union)

== Notes ==
U.S. House of Representatives
Preceded by James K. Moorhead	Member of the U.S. House of Representatives from Pennsylvania's 22nd congressional district 1869–1875	Succeeded by James H. Hopkins
Preceded by James H. Hopkins	Member of the U.S. House of Representatives from Pennsylvania's 22nd congressional district 1885–1887	Succeeded by John Dalzell
