= William Maw Egley =

English artist

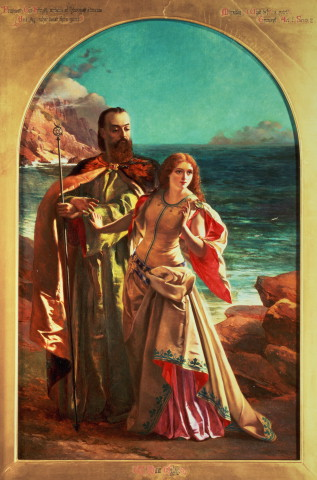
Prospero and Miranda by William Maw Egley; c. 1850

William Maw Egley (1826 in London – 20 February 1916) was an English artist of the Victorian era. The son of the miniaturist William Egley, he studied under his father. His early works were illustrations of literary subjects typical of the period, such as Prospero and Miranda from The Tempest. These were similar to the work of The Clique. William Powell Frith, one of The Clique, hired Egley to add backgrounds to his own work. Egley soon developed a style influenced by Frith, including domestic and childhood subjects. Most of his paintings were humorous or "feelgood" genre scenes of urban and rural life, depicting such subjects as harvest festivals and contemporary fashions. His best-known painting, Omnibus Life in London (Tate Gallery), is a comic scene of people squashed together in the busy, cramped public transport of the era.

Egley always showed great interest in specifics of costume, to which he paid detailed attention, but his paintings were often criticised for their hard, clumsy style.

In the 1860s, Egley adopted the fashion for romanticised 18th-century subjects. Though he produced a very large number of reliably salable paintings, his work was never critically admired.
