= Fort Negley =

Civil War Union Army fort in Nashville, TN

- U.S. National Register of Historic Places
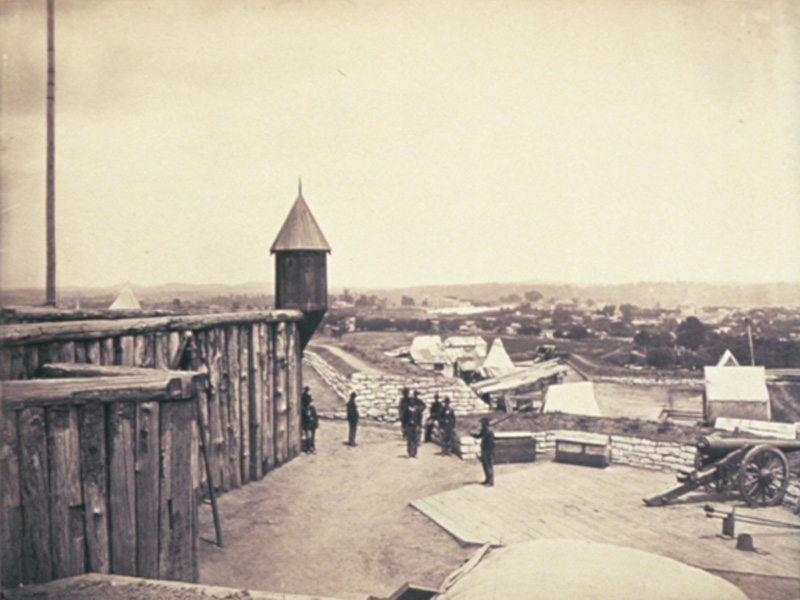
- Fort Negley in 1864
- Location: 1100 Fort Negley Blvd. Nashville, Tennessee
- Nearest city: Nashville, Tennessee
- Coordinates: 36°08′42.35″N 86°46′28.77″W
- Area: 180,000 sq ft (fort only)
- Built: 1862
- Architect: James St. Clair Morton
- NRHP reference No.: 75001748
- Added to NRHP: April 21, 1975

Fort Negley was a fortification built by Union troops after the capture of Nashville, Tennessee during the American Civil War, located approximately 2 miles (3.2 km) south of the city center. It was the largest inland fort built in the United States during the war.

== History ==
Once Confederate forces were routed in February, 1862, from Forts Henry and Donelson (on the Tennessee and Cumberland Rivers, respectively), Confederate commanders decided that any further effort in the defense of Nashville would be pointless, and they abandoned any attempt to keep Nashville behind their lines. It was almost immediately occupied by Union forces, who rapidly began preparations for its defense. The largest of the fortifications erected was Fort Negley, a star-shaped limestone block structure atop St. Cloud Hill, south of the city. The construction of the fort was overseen by Captain James St. Clair Morton. The fort was constructed out of 62,500 cubic feet (1,770 m^{3}) of stone, 18,000 cubic feet (510 m^{3}) of earth and cost $130,000. It was largely constructed using the labor of local enslaved people (including women), newly freed people who had flocked to Nashville once it was taken by Union forces with the understanding that their slavery status was to be revoked were they to work for the Union, and by free blacks forcibly conscripted for the work. Records show that 2,768 black people were officially enrolled in its construction. The fort was named for Union Army commander General James S. Negley.

13-star American flown over the fort in 1864, based off W.H.H. Fletcher lithographs

When the Battle of Nashville finally began in December 1864, it was largely fought on the heights even farther south of the city than Fort Negley, which despite its then-impressive appearance never played a leading military role. Shortly after the war, the fort was abandoned and fell into ruin; however, its outline could be readily discerned for many years afterwards in the encroaching woods. During the Reconstruction period, the area was occupied by federal troops until late 1867, after which it was used as a meeting place for the Ku Klux Klan, as confirmed by former Klansman Marcus B. Toney.

== Preservation ==
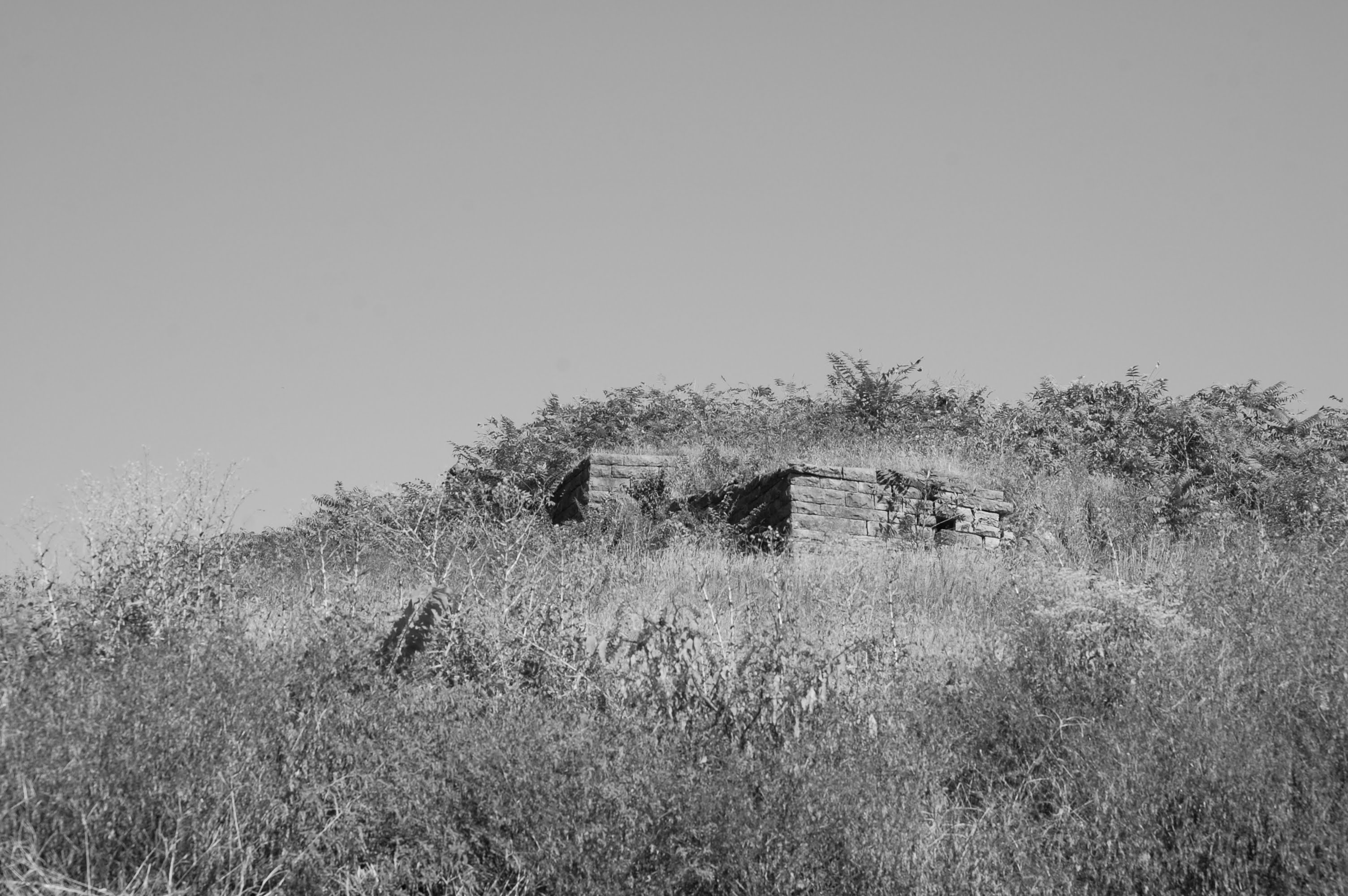
Ruins of Fort Negley

In the 1930s, the Works Progress Administration (WPA) made a major project of the restoration of Fort Negley. Almost simultaneous with the completion of this project, the United States' entered into World War II. Neither the manpower, funds, or the interest was available at the time to reopen the fort as an historic or interpretative center. After the war, the fort was allowed to become the site of vandalism and minor crime; entry to the site was finally prohibited and the area reverted to forest. The surrounding grounds became the site of a municipal park, first as the site of baseball and softball fields for youth and adult leagues, and later as the site of Herschel Greer Stadium, a Minor League Baseball ballpark. The Cumberland Science Museum, a continuation under a new name and in a new venue of the former Nashville Children's Museum (now the Adventure Science Center), was built on the northwestern slope. Most visitors to the stadium and the museum were generally unaware of what was on the wooded hilltop other than it was something which they were not allowed to access.

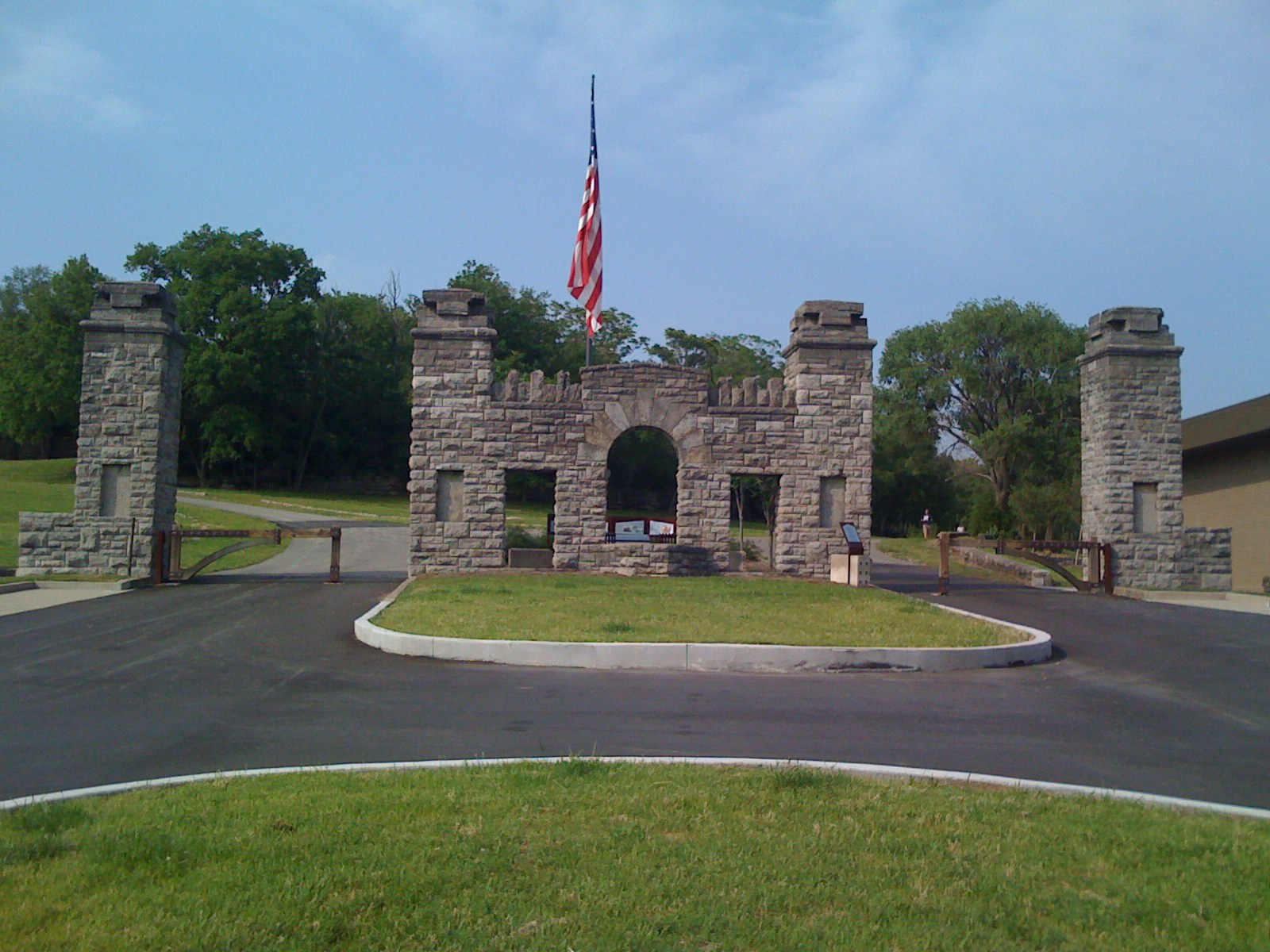
The entrance to Fort Negley Park

After years of discussions and negotiations, historic preservationists were successful in getting sufficient funding in the early 2000s for another restoration project, and the fort was reopened to the public for the first time in decades on December 10, 2004. The project went ahead when it was shown that similar places in other cities resulted in more economic stimulation and hence more tax revenue from the resultant tourism than was spent on the maintenance and operation of such sites. The recent restoration was not an attempt to restore the fort completely to its Civil War condition but rather to stabilize the ruins and make them more accessible and visible by removing many of the largest trees and moving some of the blocks back to their original positions resulting in a combination of the original fortification and the WPA restoration. In 2007, an additional $1 million in city funds was used to build a visitor center. More work on the site was planned.

Part of the city's 2017 proposed plan to redevelop the Greer Stadium site, it having sat vacant since 2015, involved highlighting the Fort's history through the creation of educational spaces and interpretive trails and the preservation of the fort and its sightlines. The plan also included redeveloping the adjacent Greer Stadium property to include music and art space, a community center, open park space, retail space, and affordable housing. The presence of significant Civil War and African American historical resources, the city's stated goal of adding 4,500 acres (1,800 ha) of park land by 2027, and the city's closed-door process of selecting a redevelopment plan were met with criticism. The developers cancelled their plans in January 2018 after archaeologists determined that undisturbed areas on the edge of the Greer property, but not part of the stadium itself, were the unmarked burial sites of slaves forced to build Fort Negley. Mayor Megan Barry expressed her desire that the site honor the history of those who died building the fort.

Fort Negley is listed as a Site of Memory in the Slave Route Project of the United Nations Educational, Scientific and Cultural Organization (UNESCO). A master plan for restoration of the site as a park and for interpretation of the site's complex history was completed in 2022.
