= Old Fort Park and Golf Course =

Golf course in Murfreesboro, TN, USA

Coordinates: 35.8534°N 86.4153°W

Old Fort Park and Golf Course is a 50-acre (20 ha) park and public golf course located in Murfreesboro, Tennessee.

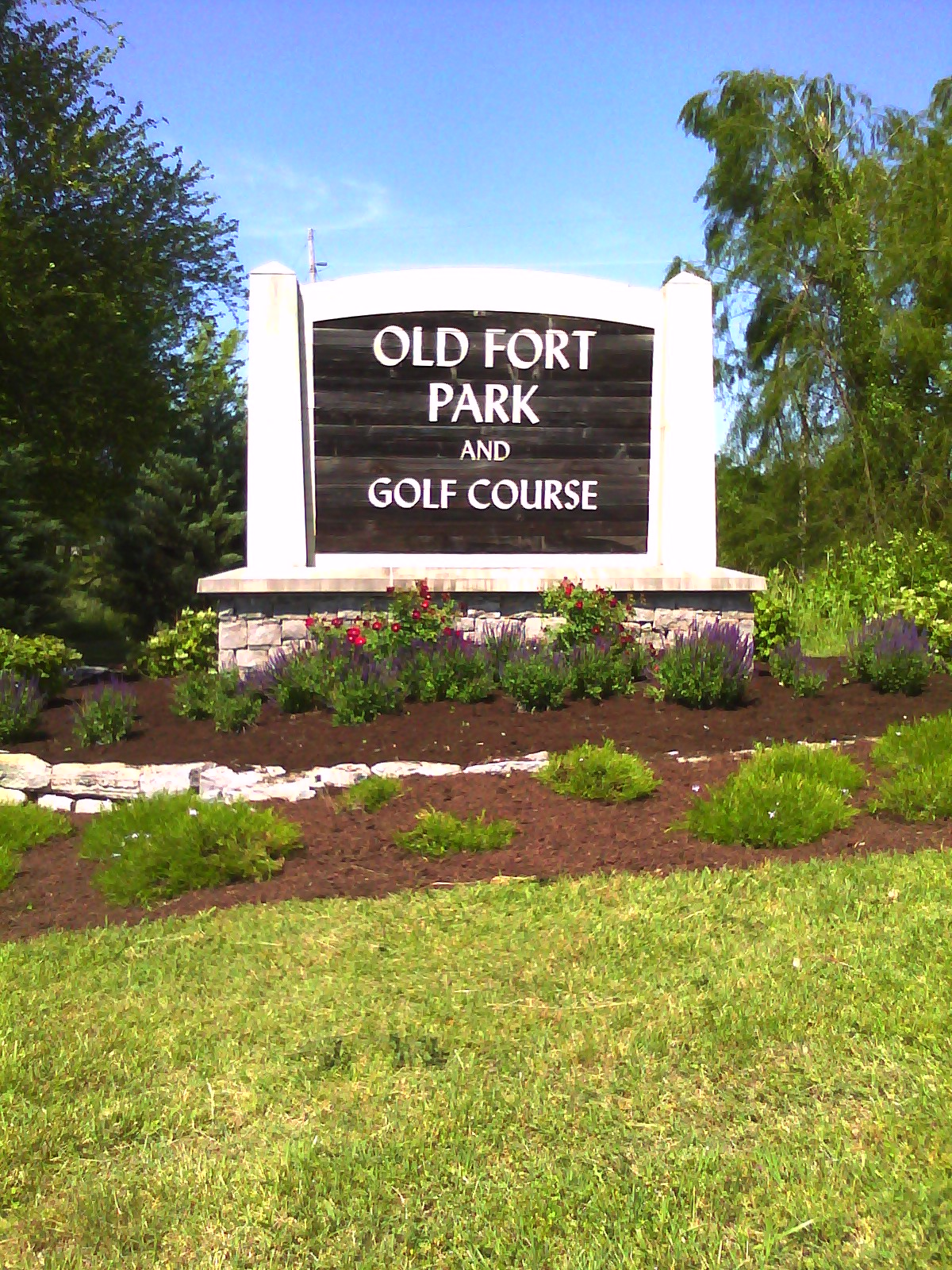
Entrance to Old Fort Park.

The park grounds include the Civil War era Fortress Rosecrans and two trailheads to the city's Greenway system. The park is bound on two sides by the West Fork of the Stones River and is bound on the east by Lytle Creek, with a small spring fed tributary to the Creek, Springs Branch, bisecting the public park.

== Old Fort Park ==
The original park site was once private farm land, which was then bought by the City of Murfreesboro in 1965. The park was dedicated on October 29, 1977. The park comprises 50 acres (20 ha) and has three picnic shelters, two play grounds, two baseball fields, eight tennis courts, and green areas. In 2010, the city began a $330,000 restoration project aimed at improving the quality of the waterways and preserving the natural spaces.

In October 2013, the City broke ground on a new $3.7 million indoor tennis facility. The joint-venture with Middle Tennessee State University will feature eight new tennis courts and will be open to the public as well as serve as the home of the Blue Raider men's and women's tennis programs.

=== Kids' Castle ===
The main playground of the park is "Kids' Castle" which was built in 1995 over the site of the original playground. Initially built of wood, the Castle was rebuilt in 2012 using synthetic materials at a cost of $300,000. The Castle was funded in part through the Tennessee Department of Environment and Conservation.

== Fortress Rosecrans ==
Fortress Rosecrans is a large earthwork fortification built in 1863 under the direction of Union General James Morton. The Fortress was given its name in honor of William Rosecrans, Commander of the Army of the Cumberland. The largest fort built during the American Civil War, it encompassed an area of 255 acres (103 ha) and had a perimeter of 3.5 miles (5.6 km).

Built following the Battle of Stones River, the Fortress originally included eight lunettes, four redoubts, a sawmill, magazines, and soldier's barracks. Sitting astride the Nashville and Chattanooga Railroad and two major roads, the fort became a center for logistical support for the Union Army. By June 12, 1863, the fort was garrisoned with 2,394 men and by October, the 22nd Wisconsin Volunteer Infantry Regiment had been stationed there.

=== Construction ===
The fort was built using the labor of 4,000 men, including a large number of African Americans. The walls averaged 10 to 15 feet (3.0 to 4.6 m) in height and 25 feet (7.6 m) in thickness at the base. They were made of compacted earth with wooden planks reinforcing the structure. A 10-foot (3 meter) ditch was dug in front of the walls and filled with abatis to deter an enemy charge.

=== Today ===
The fortress was never directly attacked during the War and by 1932 much of it had been lost, destroyed by development. Of its original 14,000 feet (4,300 m) of earthworks only 3,000 feet (910 m) remain. The remaining earthworks comprise the "Fortress Rosecrans" section of the Park. Of the four interior redoubts within Fortress Rosecrans, only Redoubt Brannan survives to this day. Redoubt Brannan lies outside of the Park boundaries.

The fortress lies between the tennis courts and the public golf course. A series of interpretive trails and boardwalks run through the remaining fortified sections and include construction facts, quotes, diagrams, and other information. The city's Greenway "Fortress Rosecrans" trailhead is also located here.

== Golf course ==
The Old Fort Golf Club was established by the City in 1985 and was designed by Leon Howard and Denis Griffiths. The 18-hole golf course runs 6,859 yards with a Par score of 72. The course rating is 72.8 and it has a slope rating of 125. The facility also has two 8,000 sq ft putting and chipping greens and a clubhouse. Junior, beginner, and intermediate classes can be taken at the facility. Private lessons are also available with the on-staff PGA instructor.

There are three golf associations at the club, the Men's Golf Association, Ladies' Golf Associate, and the Senior League.

== Gallery ==
Old Fort Park and Golf Course
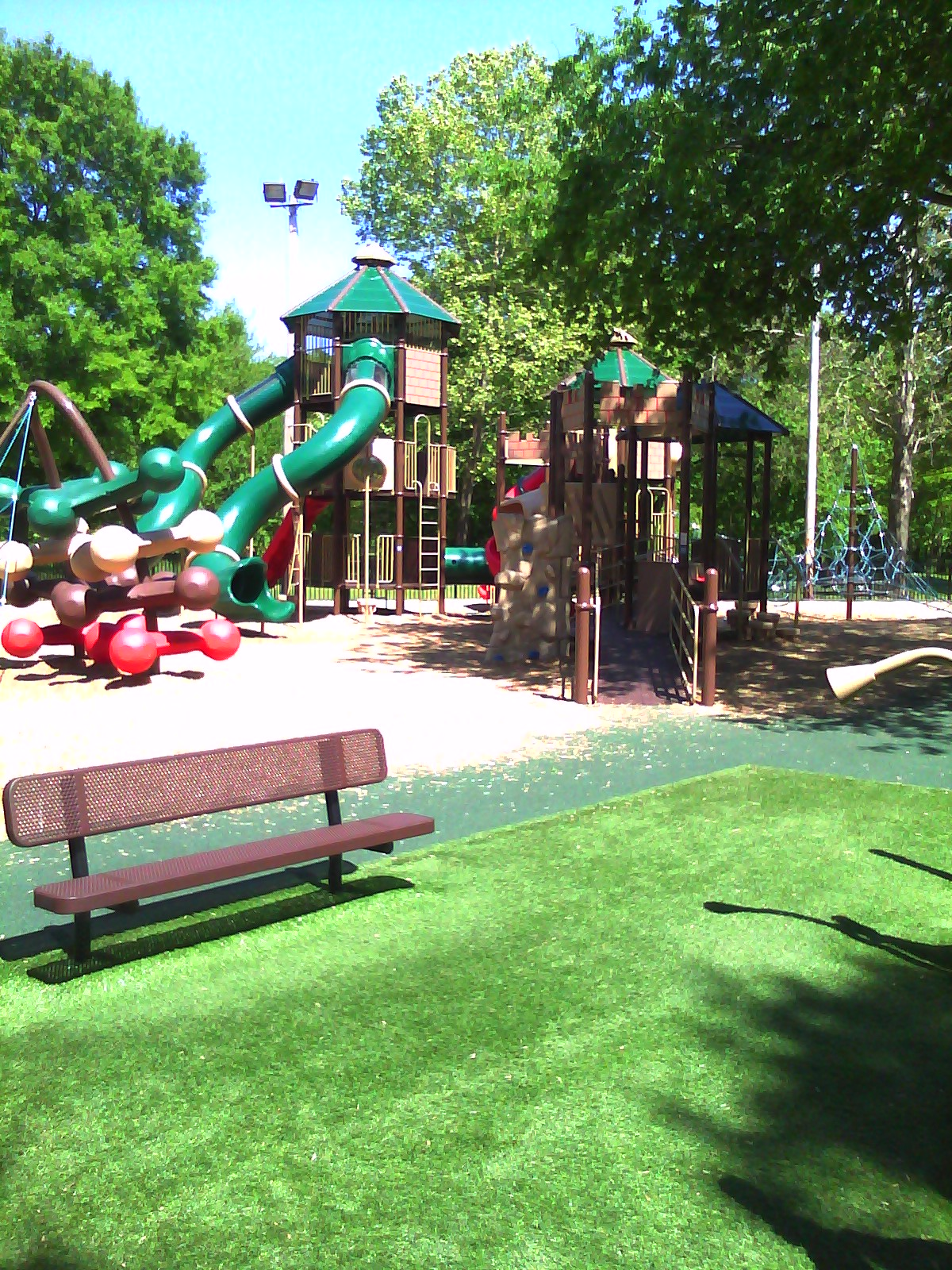
Kids' Castle.

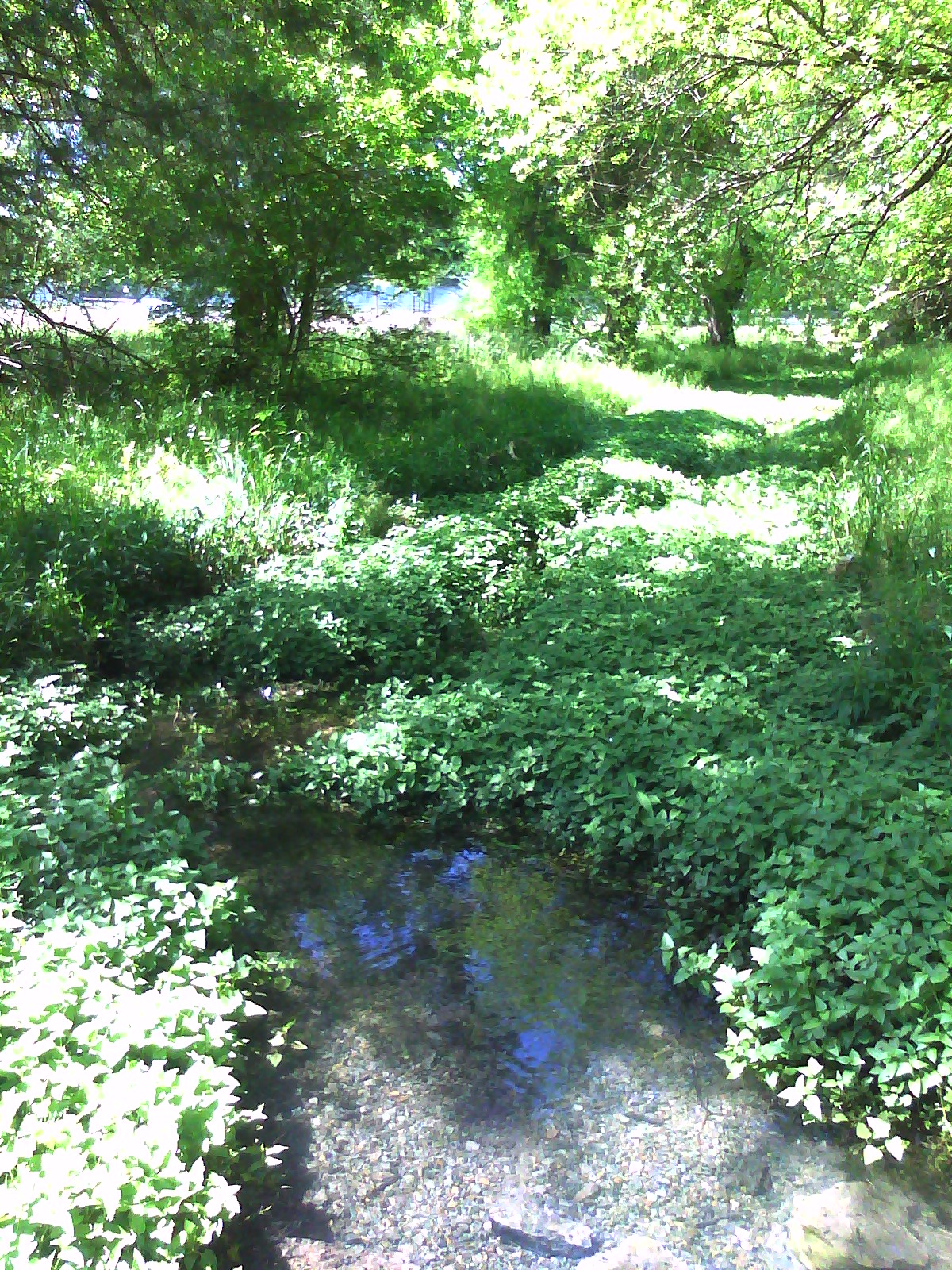
The Springs Branch stream.

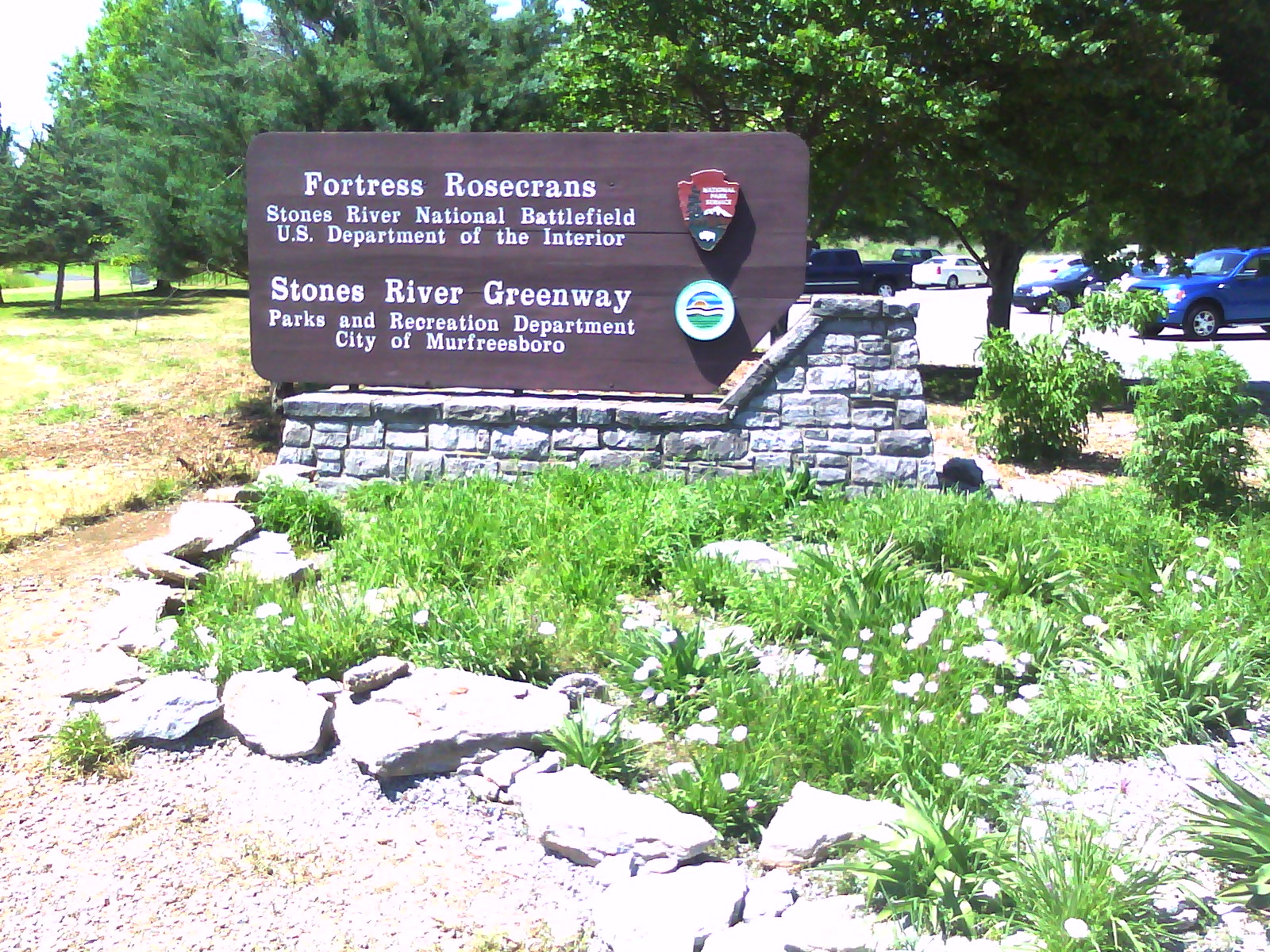
The entrance sign to Fortress Rosecrans.

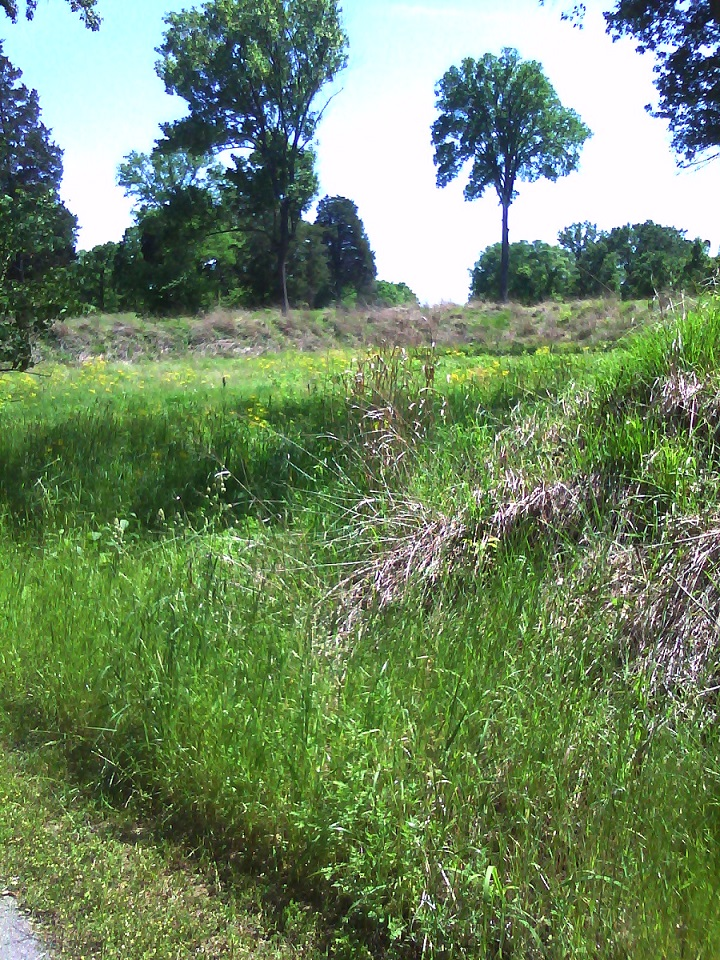
A portion of the curtain wall.

== See also ==
- Stones River National Battlefield
