= 1895 in art =

The year 1895 in art involved some significant events.

== Events ==
- January 1 – Alphonse Mucha's lithographed poster for the play Gismonda starring Sarah Bernhardt is posted in Paris. Bernhardt is so satisfied with its success that she gives Mucha a six-year contract.
- April 13 – The Russian Museum is established in Saint Petersburg by Nicholas II.
- April 30 – First Venice Biennale opens.
- May 6 – The Royal Academy Exhibition of 1895 opens at Burlington House in London
- July 3 – Paul Gauguin leaves France to settle permanently in Polynesia.
- October – Edvard Munch exhibits an extended series of his Love paintings in Christiania, Norway.
- November – Paul Cézanne has his first solo exhibition, at the Paris gallery of Ambroise Vollard.
- Munch (probably) writes "Could only have been painted by a madman" (Kan kun være malet af en gal Mand!) on his 1893 painting The Scream.
- Bernard Berenson publishes Lorenzo Lotto: An Essay in Constructive Art Criticism.
- P. H. Emerson publishes his last photographic book, Marsh Leaves.
- M. H. de Young Memorial Museum opened in Golden Gate Park, San Francisco.

== Works ==
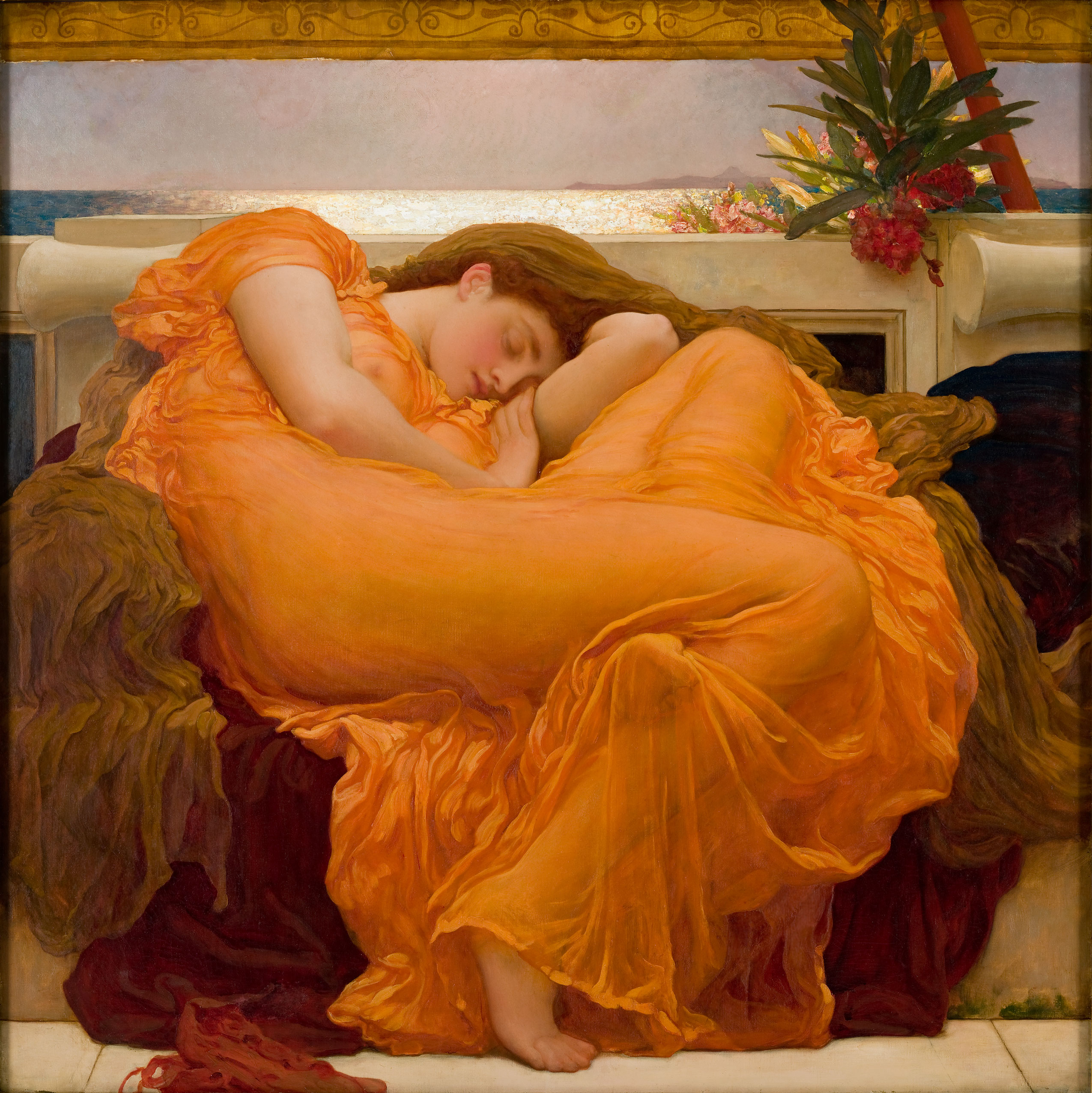
Flaming June (Leighton)

- Lawrence Alma-Tadema – A Coign of Vantage
- Rodolfo Amoedo – Más Notícias
- Aubrey Beardsley – Venus Between Terminal Gods (ink drawing)
- William Adolphe Bouguereau -The Abduction of Psyche
- Elizabeth Thompson, Lady Butler – Dawn of Waterloo
- John Cassidy – Statue of Edward Colston (Bristol)
- Paul Cézanne
  - The Boy in the Red Vest
  - Still Life with Cherub (approximate date)
- Edgar Degas
  - After the Bath, Woman drying herself (probable latest date)
  - Photographic self-portrait
- Thomas Eakins – Portrait of Maud Cook
- Paul Gauguin – Oviri (stoneware)
- Countess Feodora von Gleichen – Statue of Queen Victoria surrounded by children, Royal Victoria Hospital, Montreal
- J. W. Godward
  - Mischief And Repose
  - The Muse Erato At Her Lyre
- Andrew Carrick Gow – Napoleon on the Sands at Boulogne
- Sydney Prior Hall – Joseph Chamberlain and Arthur Balfour
- Winslow Homer
  - Cannon Rock
  - Northeaster
- George W. Joy
  - The Bayswater Omnibus
  - Joan of Arc
- Sir Frederic Leighton
  - Candida
  - Flaming June
  - Lachrymae
  - Listener
  - The Maid with the Golden Hair
  - A Study
  - 'Twixt hope and fear
- Isaac Levitan – Fresh Wind. Volga
- Juan Luna
  - La Bulaqueña
  - Tampuhan
- Henry Arthur McArdle – Battle of San Jacinto
- Louis Maurer – The Great Royal Buffalo Hunt
- Gustave Moreau – Jupiter and Semele
- Edvard Munch
  - After the Fall of Man (Ashes)
  - Jealousy
  - Madonna
  - Self-Portrait with Cigarette
  - Self-Portrait with Skeleton Arm (lithograph)
- Roderic O'Conor – La Jeune Bretonne
- Pierre-Auguste Renoir – Gabrielle et Jean
- Tom Roberts – Bailed Up
- John Singer Sargent – Frederick Law Olmsted
- Carlos Schwabe – La mort du fossoyeur ("The Death of the Gravedigger")
- Valentin Serov – Portrait of Countess Varvara Musina-Pushkina
- Marianne Stokes – St. Elizabeth of Hungary Spinning for the Poor
- Théophile Steinlen – Les Chanteurs des Rues
- Vardges Sureniants – Desecrated Shrine
- Dorothy Tennant – L'Amour Blessé
- James Tissot – La femme préhistorique
- Henri de Toulouse-Lautrec – Portrait of Oscar Wilde
- Louis Tuaillon – Amazone zu Pferde (bronze equestrian statue, Berlin)
- Laurits Tuxen – The Wedding of Tsar Nicholas II
- John Henry Twachtman – The White Bridge (Minneapolis Institute of Arts)
- Félix Vallotton – Clair de lune ("Moonlight")
- J. Alden Weir – The Ice Cutters
- W. L. Wyllie – The Opening of Tower Bridge

== Births ==
- January 21 – Cristóbal Balenciaga, Spanish fashion designer (died 1972)
- February 6 – Franz Radziwill, German painter (died 1983)
- March 1 – Ogura Yuki, Japanese nihonga painter (died 2000)
- March 4 – Mikuláš Galanda, Slovak modernist painter and illustrator (died 1938)
- March 29 – Anne Redpath, Scottish still life painter (died 1965)
- April 7
  - Jim Ede, English art collector (died 1990)
  - John Bernard Flannagan, American sculptor (suicide 1942)
- May 8 – Georg Muche, German painter (died 1987)
- June 3 – Frank McKelvey, Irish painter (died 1974)
- June 5 – William Roberts, British painter (died 1980)
- June 30 – Heinz Warneke, German-born American sculptor (died 1983)
- July 2 – Gen Paul, French painter and engraver (died 1975)
- July 19 – Xu Beihong, Chinese painter (died 1953)
- August 7 – Alain Saint-Ogan, French comics author and artist (died 1974)
- August 13 – Gluck, born Hannah Gluckstein, English painter (died 1978)
- August 17 – Talbert Abrams, American "father of aerial photography" (died 1990)
- November 1 – David Jones, British poet and painter (died 1974)
- December 26 – Jefto Perić, Serbian painter (died 1967)
- date unknown
  - Ilija Bašičević, Serbian painter and father of painter-sculptor Dimitrije Bašičević (died 1972)
  - Marguerite Huré, French stained glass artist (died 1967)

== Deaths ==
- January 5 – Władysław Podkowiński, Polish painter and illustrator (born 1866)
- February 1 – Mary Thornycroft, English sculptor (born 1809)
- February 8 – Jean-François Portaels, Belgian painter (born 1818)
- March 2 – Berthe Morisot, French Impressionist painter (born 1841)
- March 6 – Edwin Forbes, American landscape painter and etcher (born 1839)
- April 19 – Sir George Scharf, English art critic (born 1820)
- April 21 – Arthur Gilbert, English landscape painter (born 1819)
- May 24 – Joseph Quinaux, Belgian landscape painter (born 1822)
- September 9 – Gaetano Milanesi, Italian art historian (born 1813)
- September 21 – Silvestro Lega, Italian realist painter (born 1826)
- November 23 – Mauritz de Haas, Dutch-American marine painter (born 1832)
