= Nor'easter (disambiguation) =

Nor'easter or Northeaster may refer to:

- Nor'easter, a type of winter storm on the east coast of North America
- Black nor'easter, a type of storm that occurs on the southeast east coast of Australia
- Nor'easter (American Horror Story), an episode of the television show
- Northeaster (painting), an 1885 work
- Fly – The Great Nor'easter, a roller coaster in New Jersey
- Nor'easter (film), a film by Andrew Brotzman
- The Northeastern University Nor'easters, a collegiate a cappella group.
