= Cannon Rock (painting) =

Painting by Winslow Homer

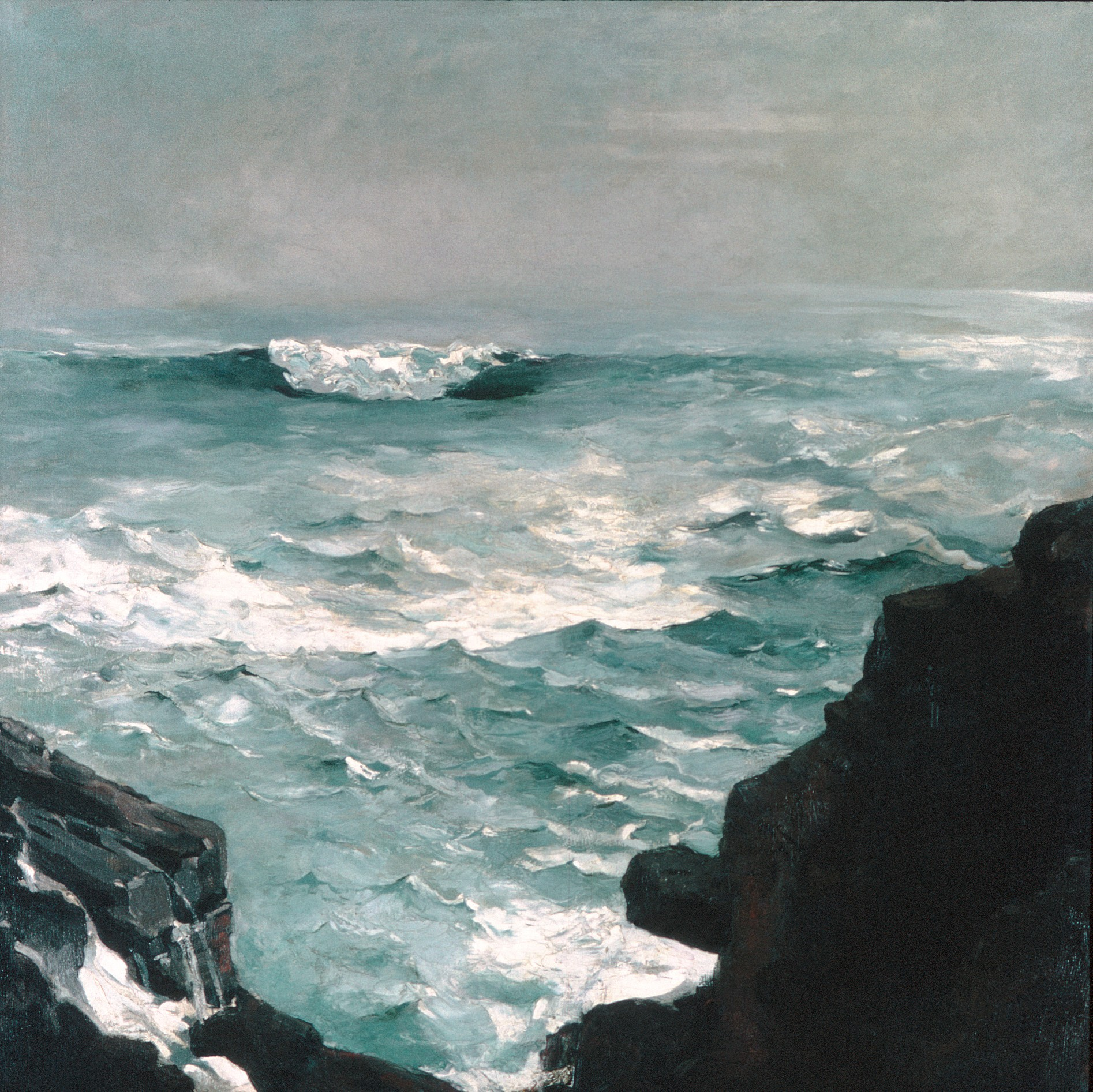
- Artist: Winslow Homer
- Year: 1895
- Medium: Oil on canvas
- Dimensions: 101.6 cm × 101.6 cm (40.0 in × 40.0 in)
- Location: Metropolitan Museum of Art; New York City, New York, United States

Cannon Rock is an 1895 oil painting by the American artist Winslow Homer. It is part of the Metropolitan Museum of Art's collection.

== Description ==
Cannon Rock depicts an offshore wave breaking over a submerged shelf, with water surging into an inlet created by rocks in the foreground.

== Background ==
In late 19th-century, Homer's painted several seascapes, such as The Gulf Stream (1899), Moonlight – Wood's Island Light (1886), and Northeaster (1895). Many of Homer's seascapes depict the strife of the sea and the shore, and the waves crashing onto the rocky shore. It has been said that they "are among the strongest expressions in all art of the power and dangerous beauty of the sea".

== Reception ==
The New York Times's Geraldine Fabricant said the painting is not a literal representation and "bears little resemblance to the actual place". She writes, "In reality, the offshore wave would break only at low tide, but the wave fills the inlet only at high tide." In his Winslow Homer in the 1890s: Prout's Neck Observed, Homer expert Philip Beam noted the artist's rearranging of the horizontal ledges of rock into a triangular shape so that "it rivets attention on his main motive".

== See also ==
- 1895 in art
- List of paintings by Winslow Homer
