= Royal Academy Exhibition of 1895 =

1895 art exhibition in London

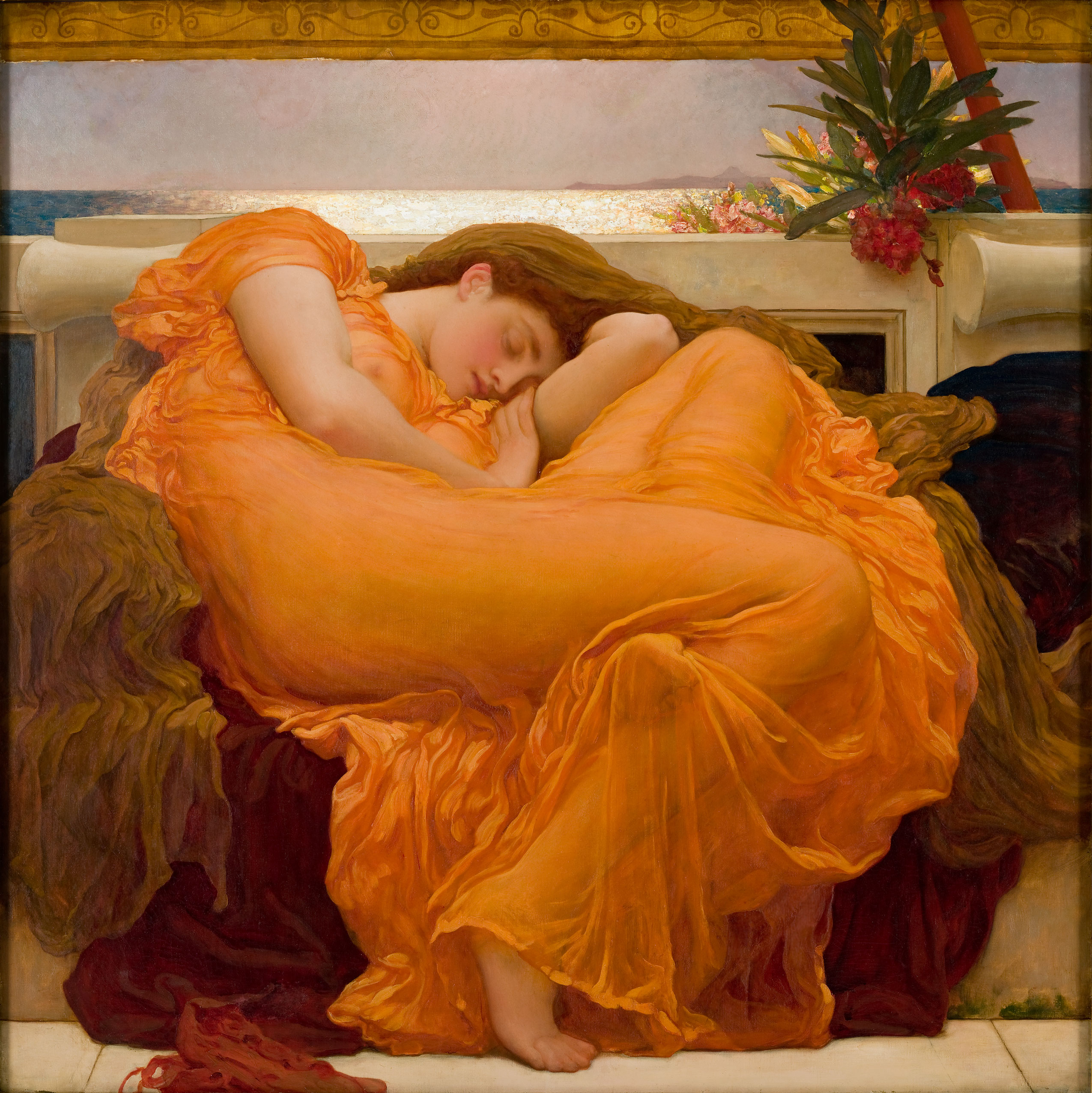
Flaming June by Frederic Leighton

The Royal Academy Exhibition of 1895 was the hundred and twenty seventh annual Summer Exhibition of the British Royal Academy of Arts. It was held at Burlington House in London's Piccadilly between 6 May and 5 August 1895 and drew over three hundred thousand visitors. It featured works by leading artists and architects of the late Victorian era. It was the final exhibition of the President of the Royal Academy Frederic Leighton who died in January of the following year. Leighton still managed to submit six paintings that for the exhibition. Amongst the works Leighton displayed is one of his most famous Flaming June.

As Leighton was too ill to attend the customary dinner held before the opening of the exhibition, John Everett Millais deputised for him at the event which was attended by the Prince of Wales, the Prime Minister Lord Rosebery as well as the writers Arthur Conan Doyle and Arthur Wing Pinero. Millais, who would go on to succeed Leighton as president, himself exhibited the works Saint Stephen and Speak! Speak!. Elizabeth Thompson displayed Dawn of Waterloo and Richard Caton Woodville presented the Charge of the Light Brigade.

== Gallery ==
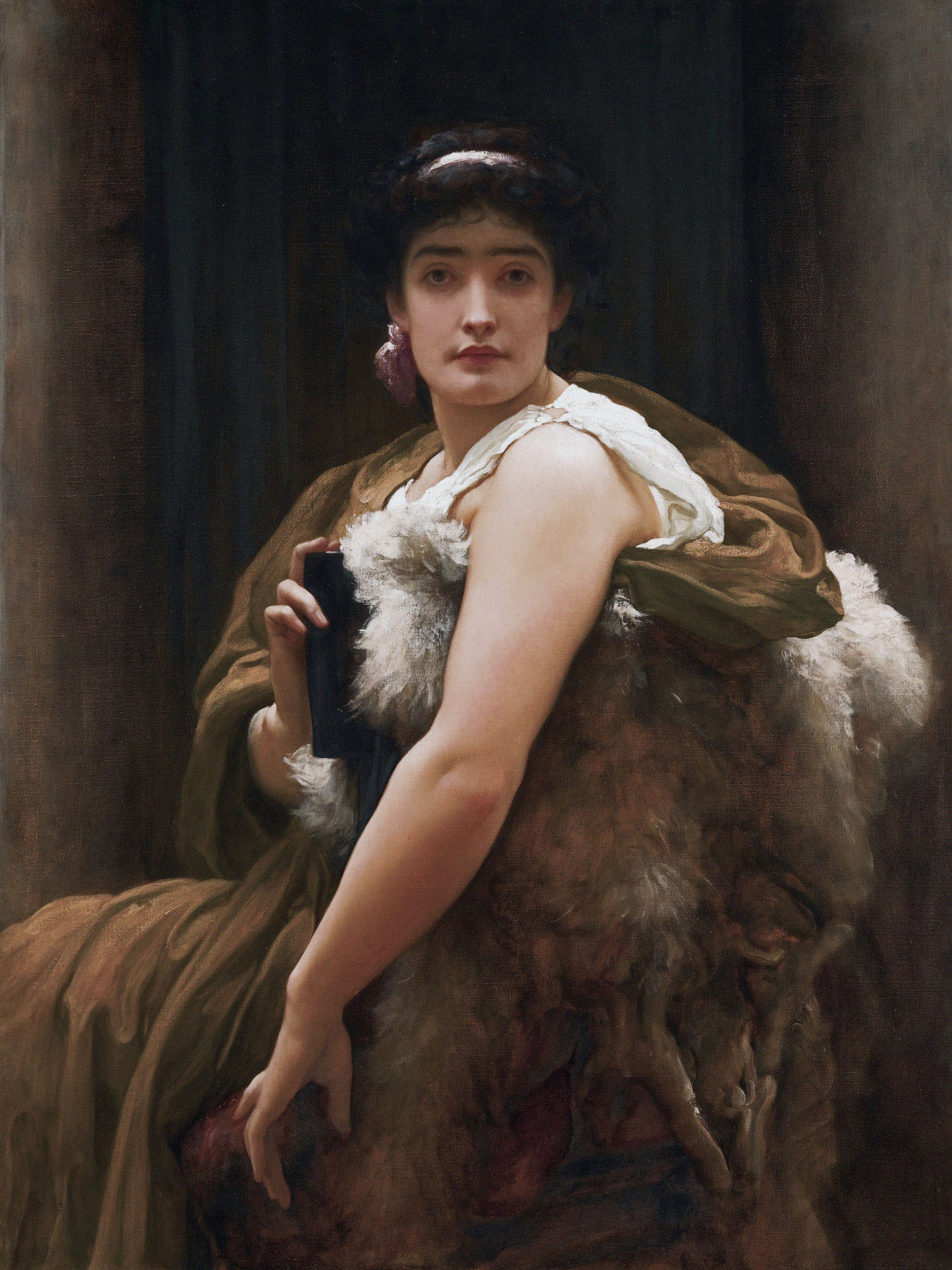
Twixt Hope and Fear by Frederic Leighton

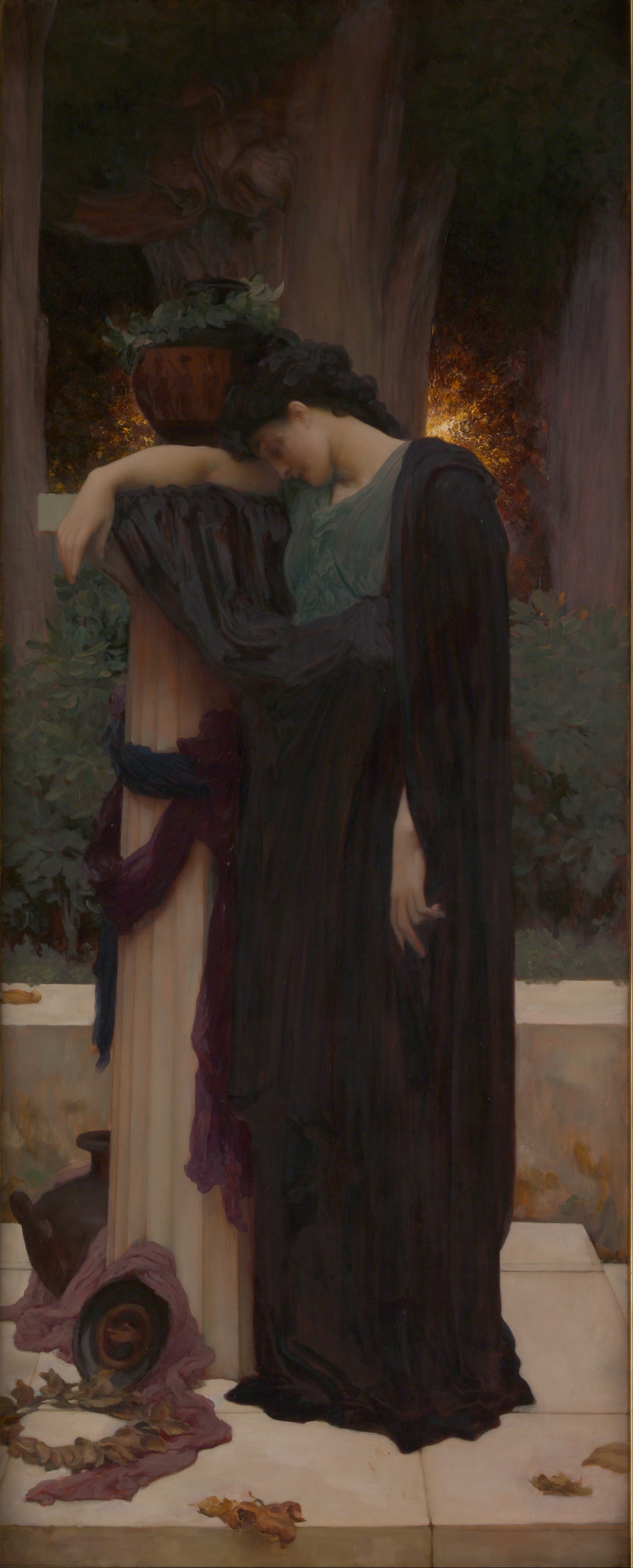
Lachrymae by Frederic Leighton

The Maid with the Golden Hair by Frederic Leighton

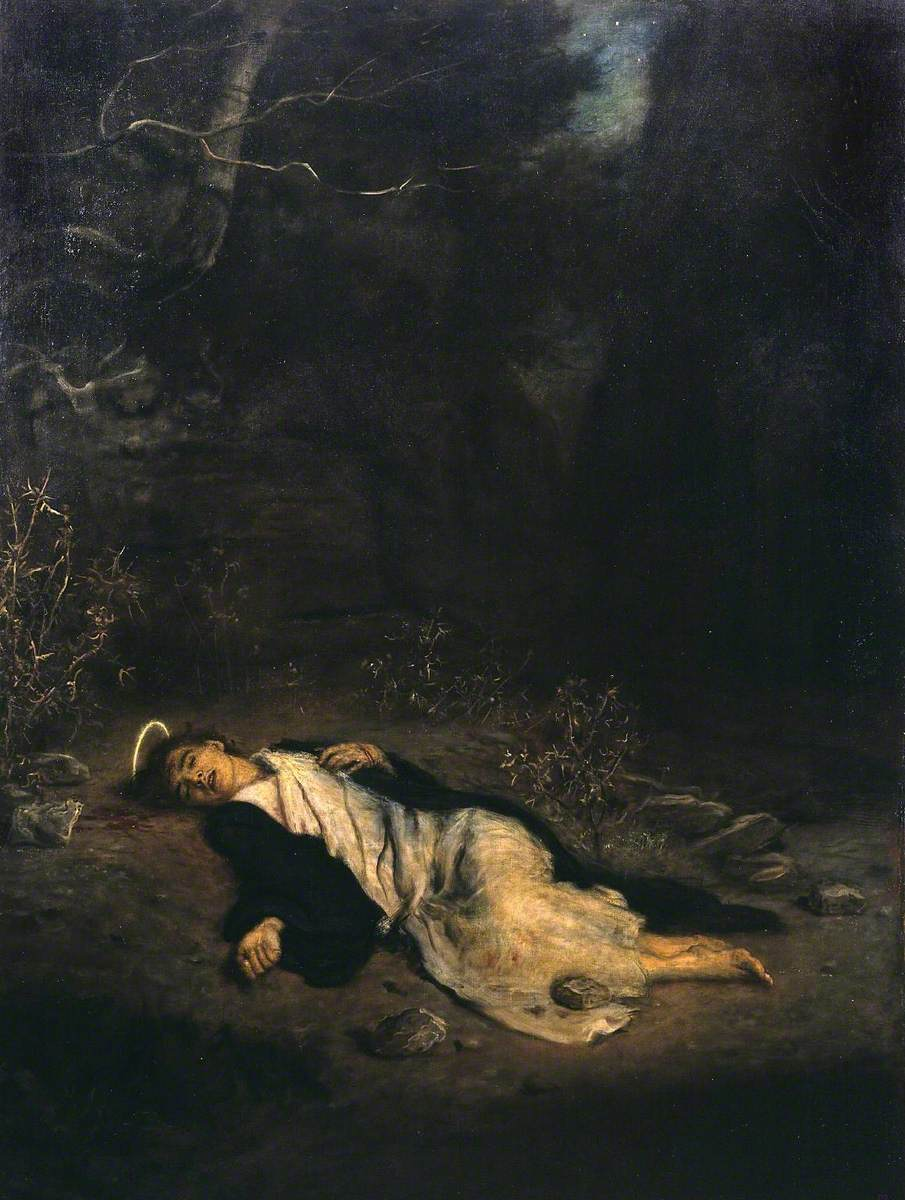
Saint Stephen by John Everett Millais

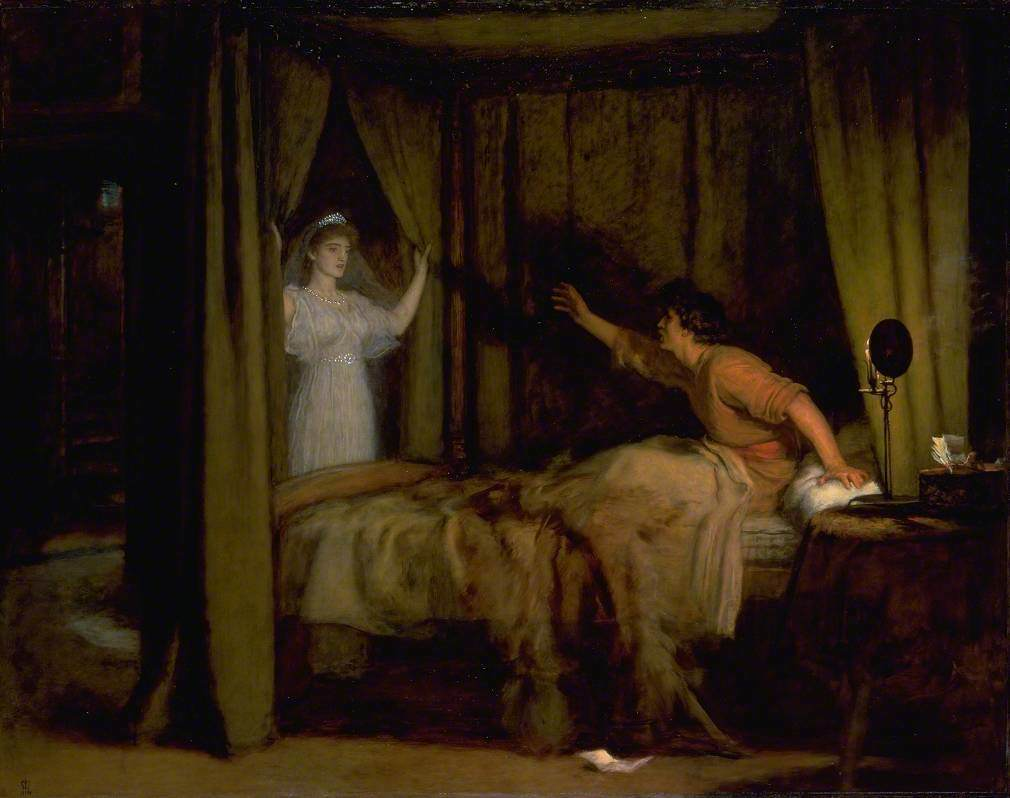
Speak! Speak! by John Everett Millais

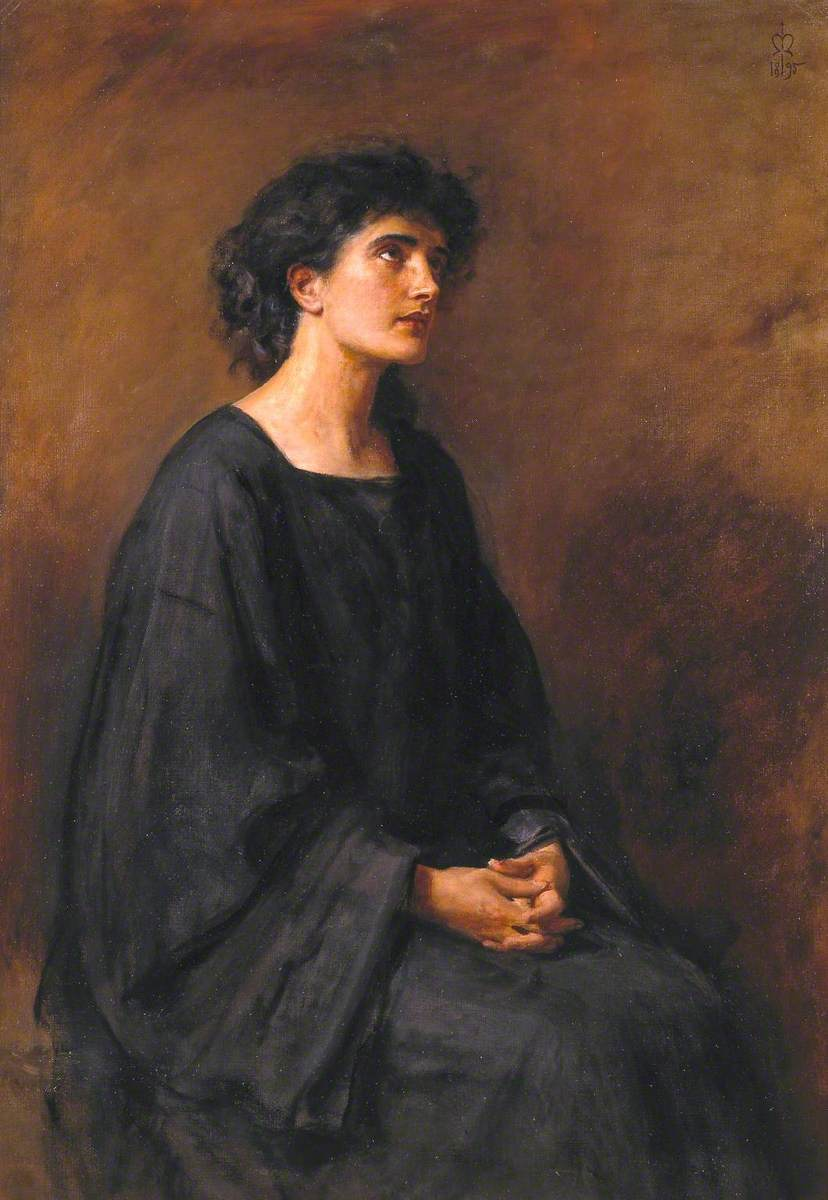
A Disciple by John Everett Millais

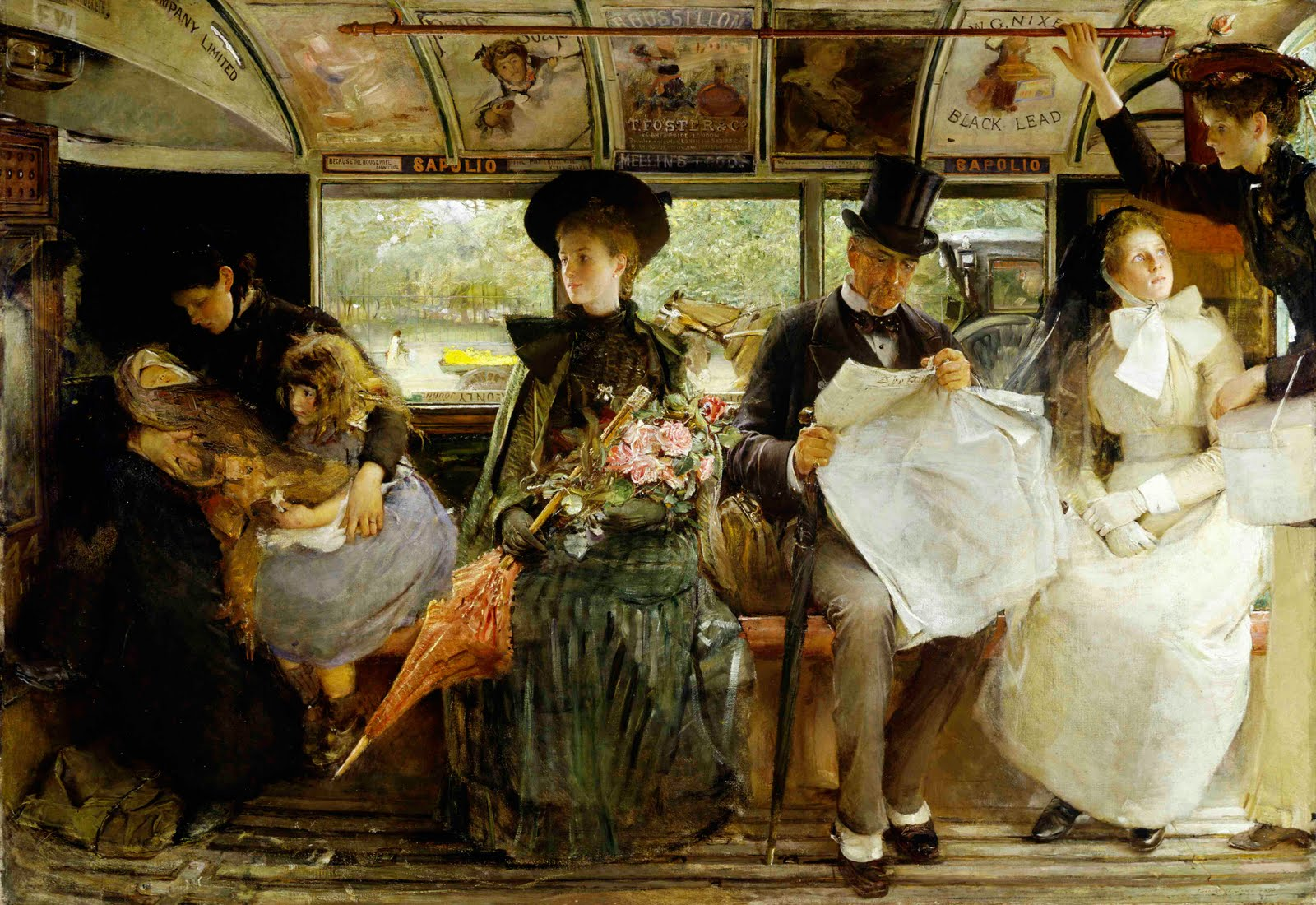
The Bayswater Omnibus by George William Joy

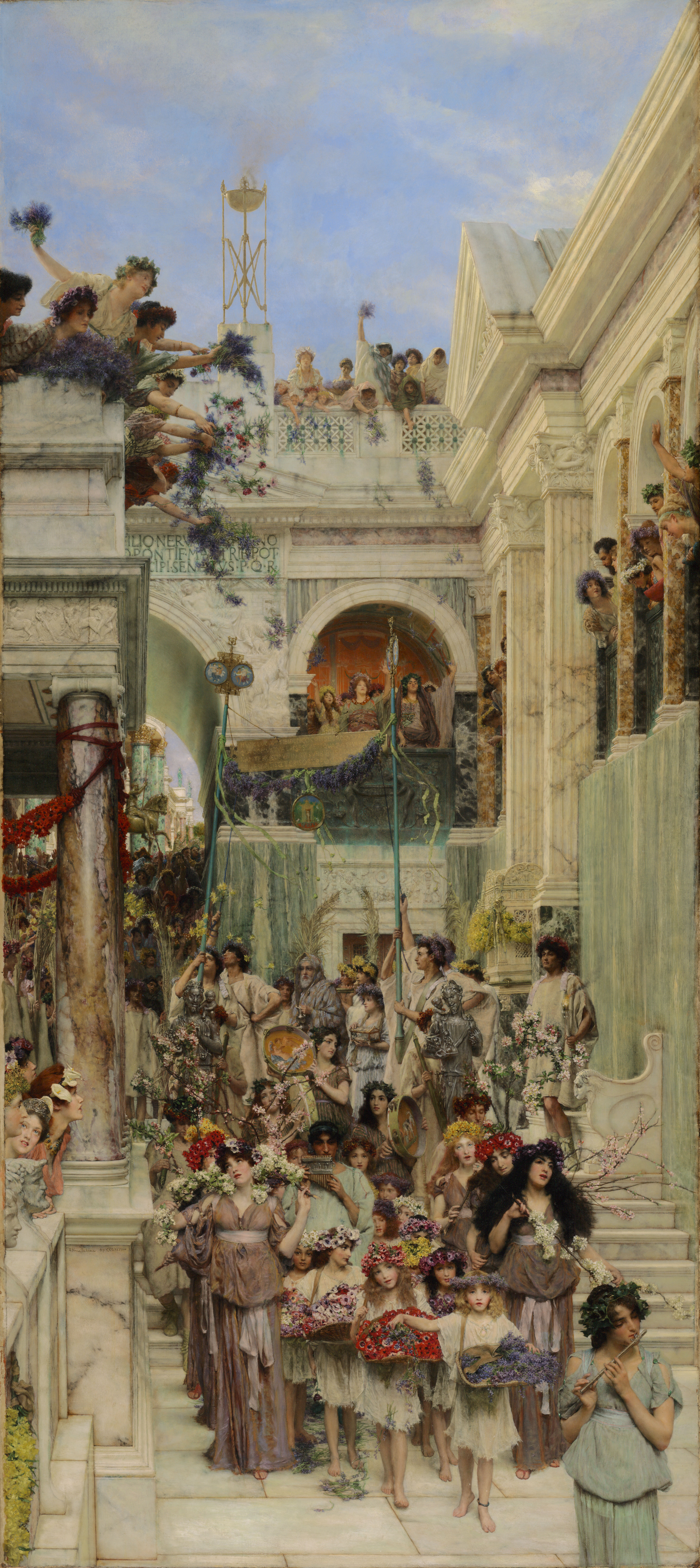
Spring by Lawrence Alma-Tadema

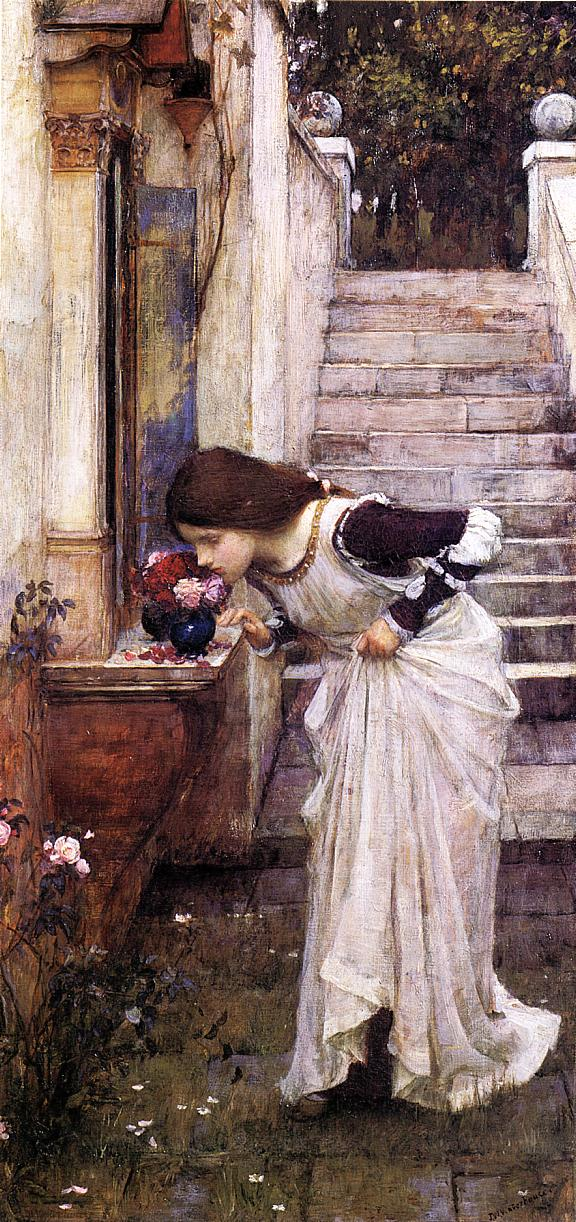
The Shrine by John William Waterhouse

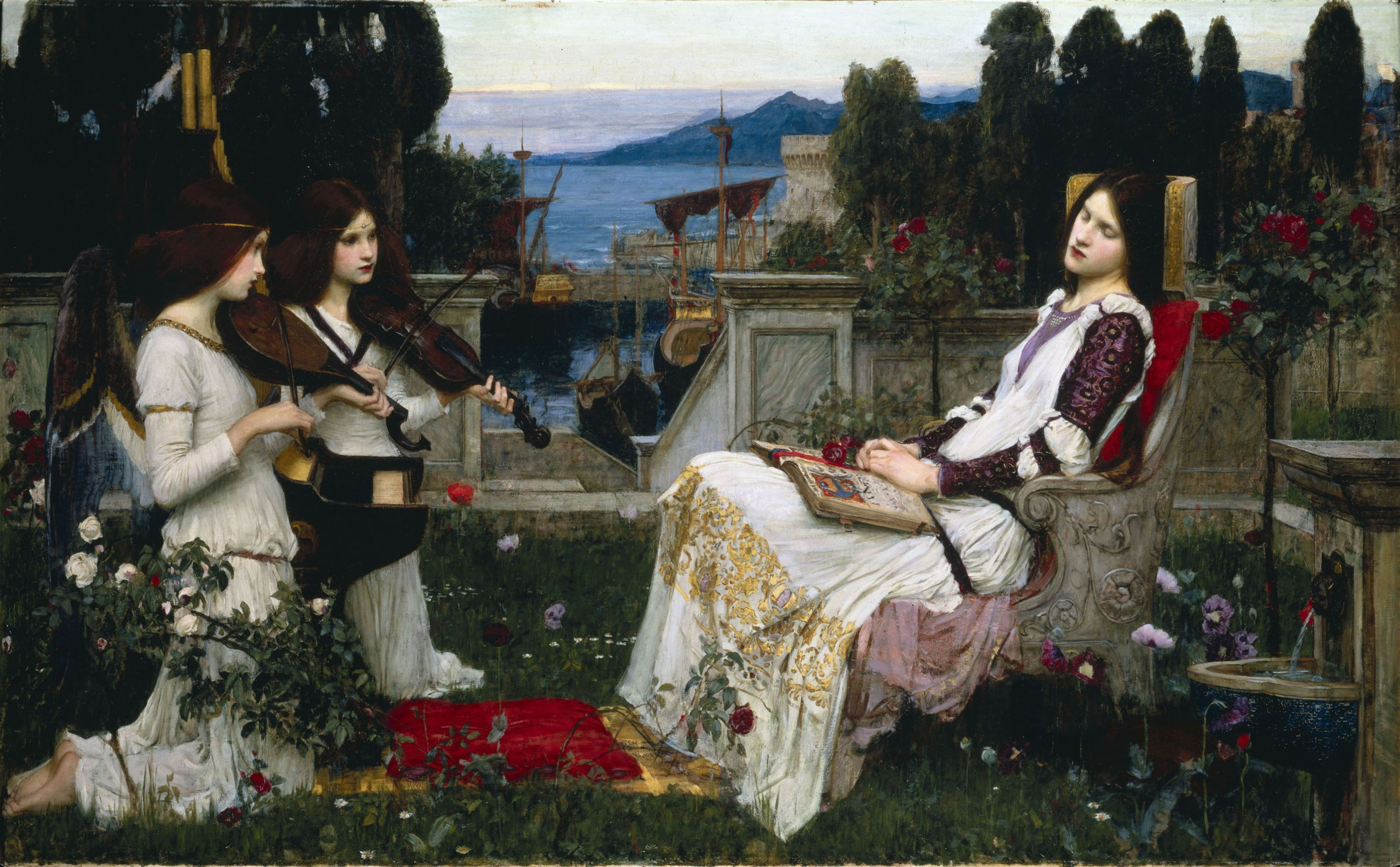
Saint Cecilia by John William Waterhouse

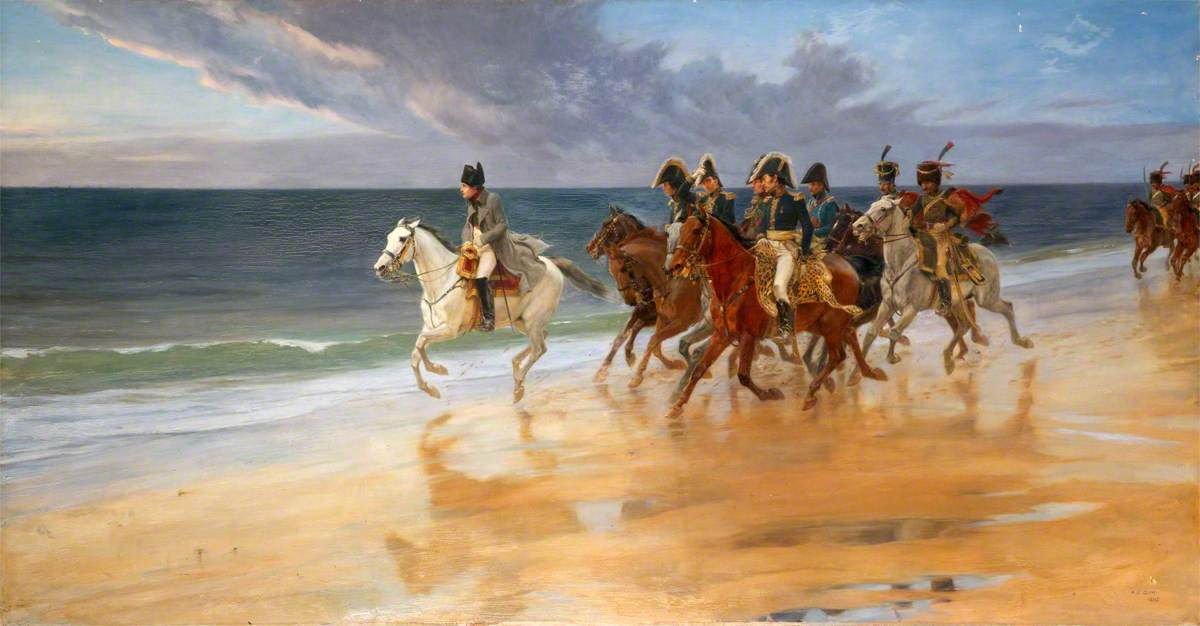
Napoleon on the Sands at Boulogne by Andrew Carrick Gow

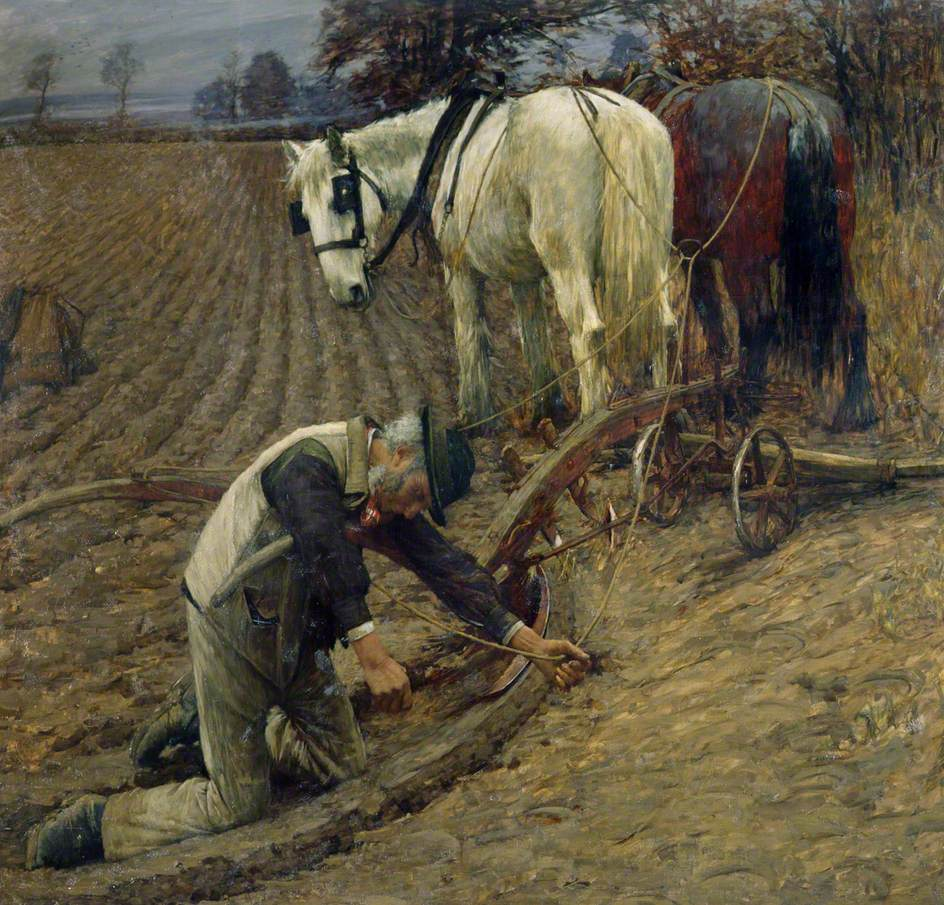
The Last Furrow by Henry Herbert La Thangue

Defendant and Counsel by William Frederick Yeames

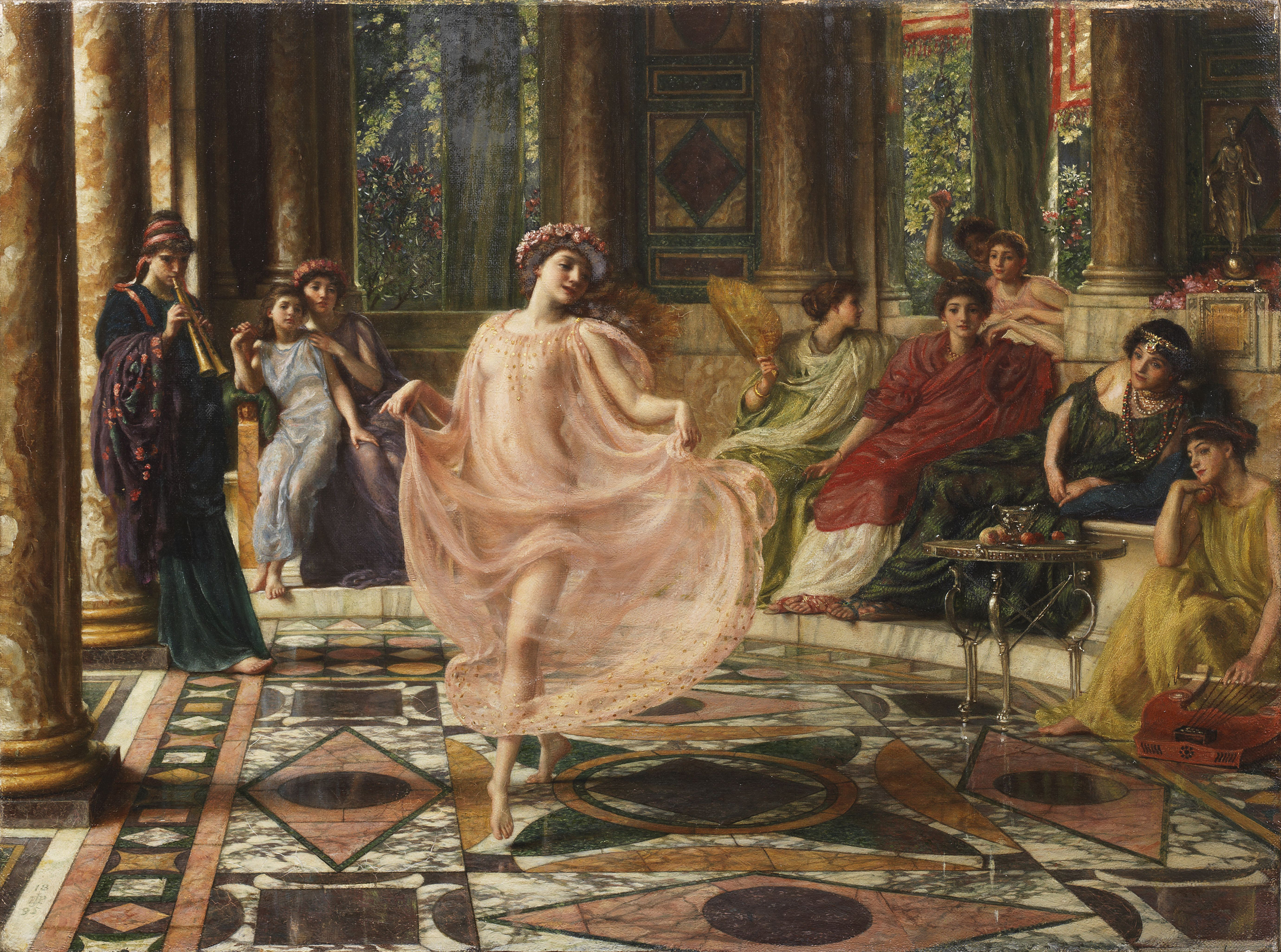
The Ionian Dance by Edward Poynter

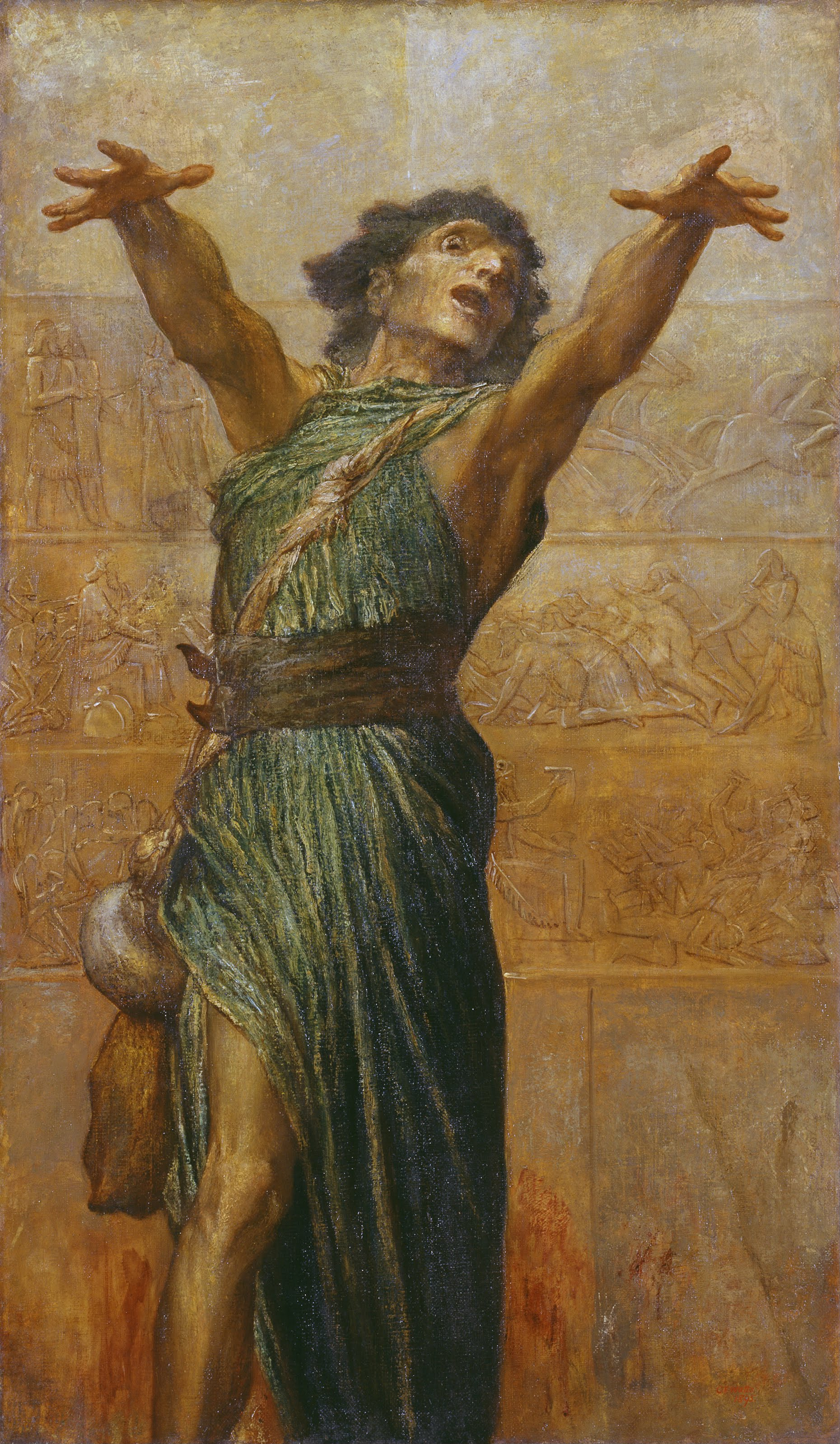
Jonah by George Frederic Watts

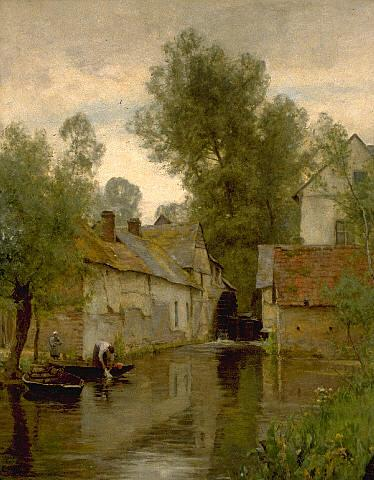
The Water Mill by Ernest Waterlow

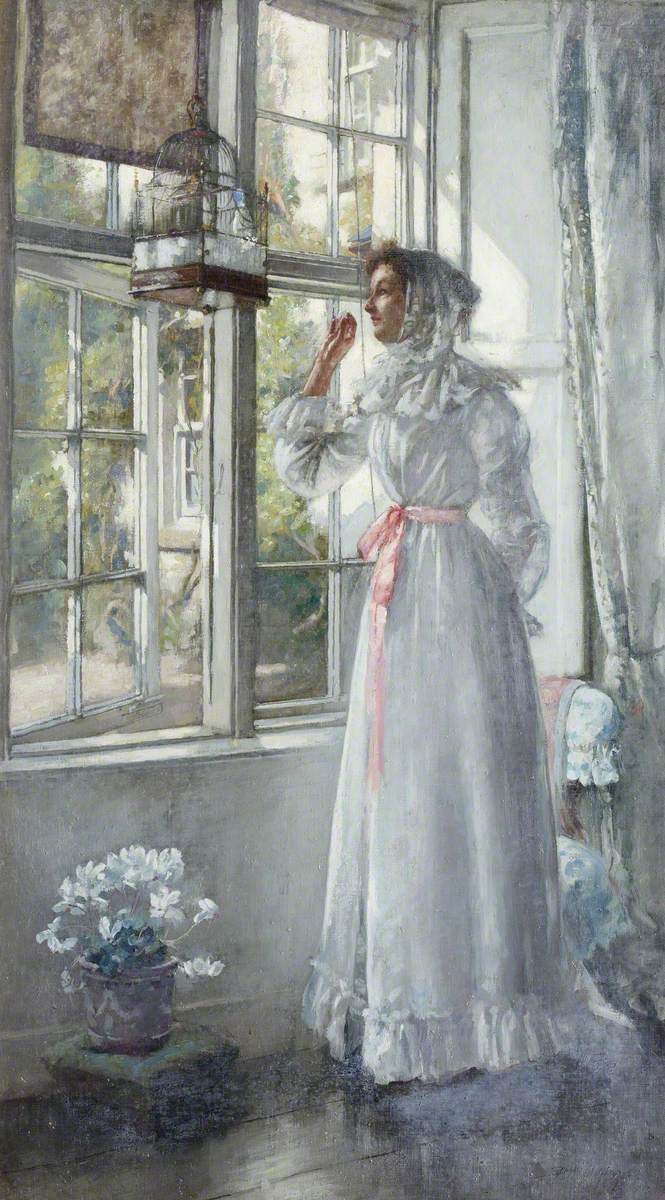
Morning by Patrick William Adam

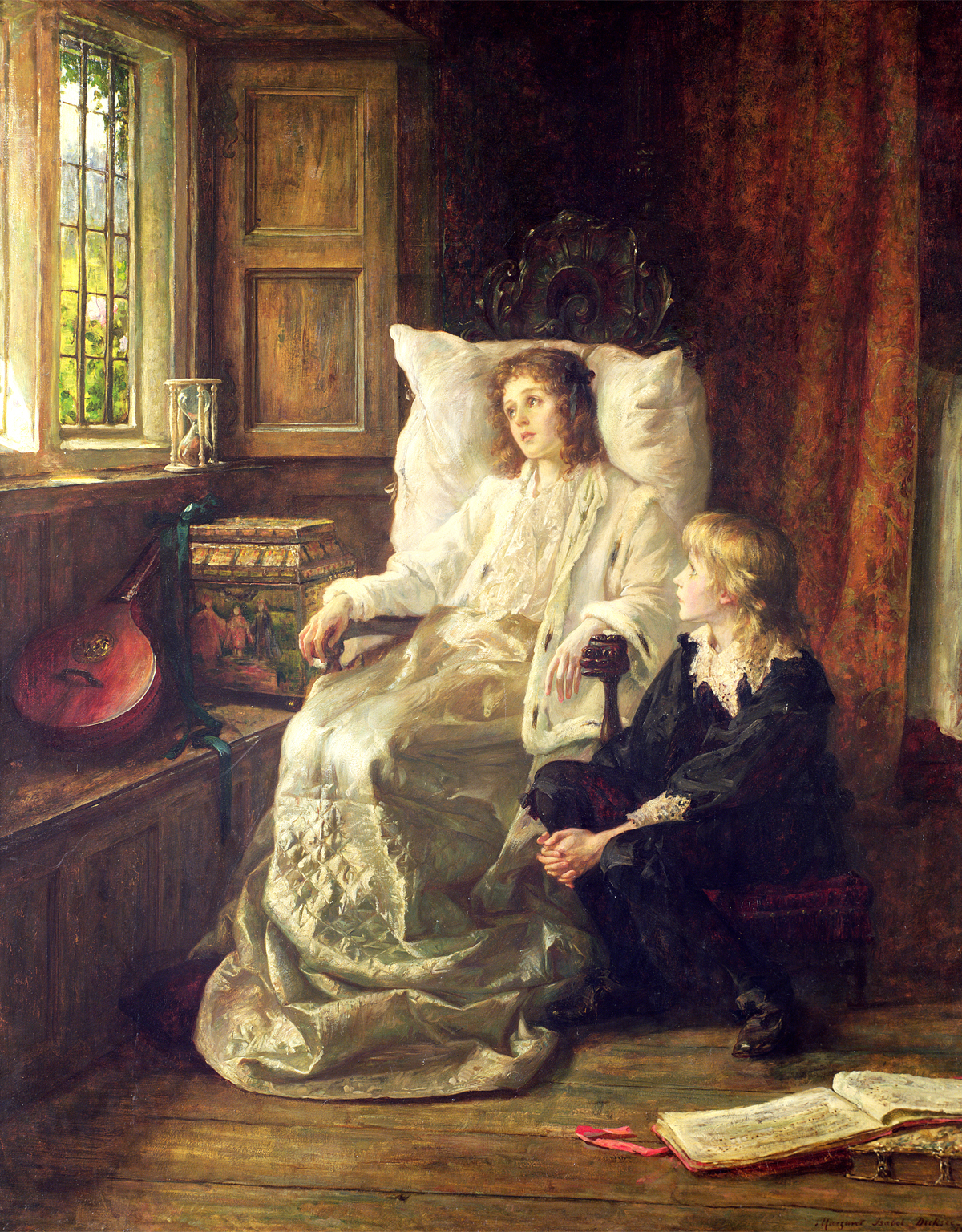
The Children of Charles I by Margaret Isabel Dicksee

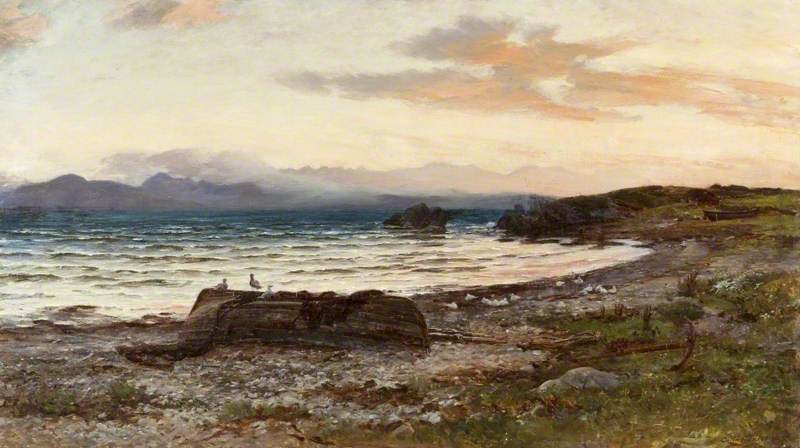
Good Night to Skye by Colin Hunter

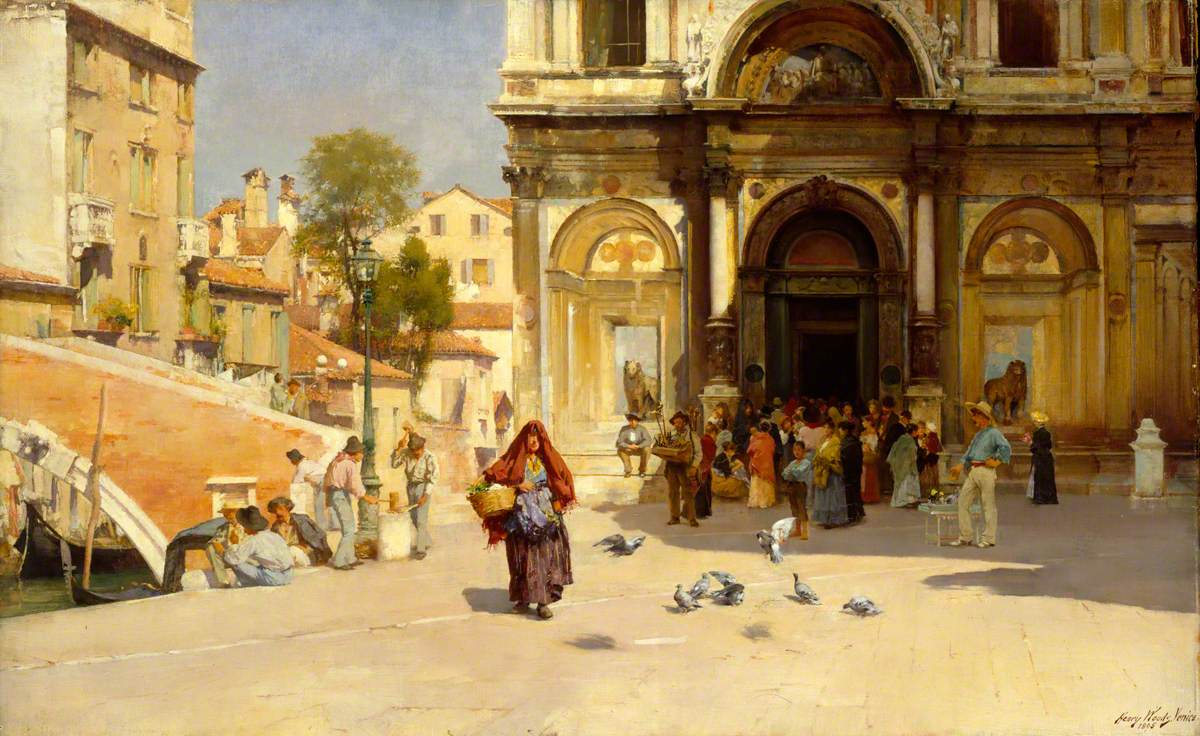
Il Campo SS Giovanni e Paolo, Venice by Henry Woods

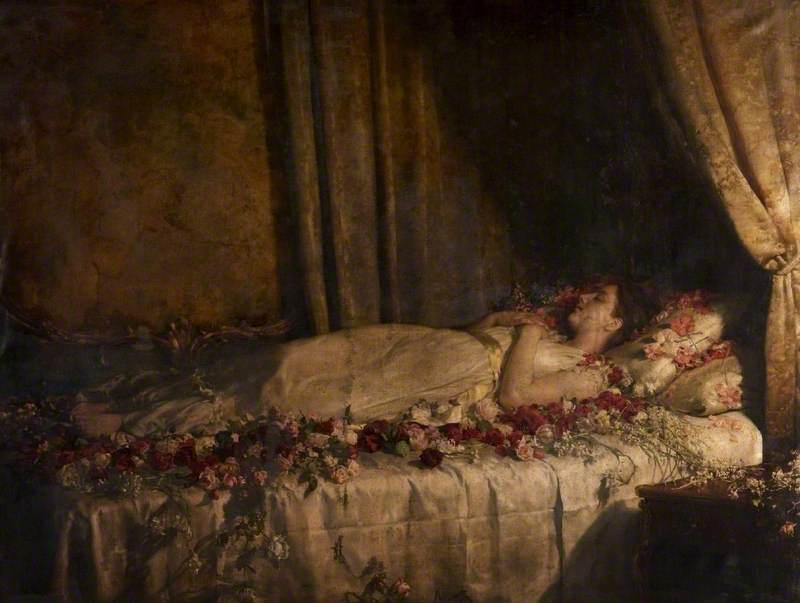
The Death of Albine by John Collier

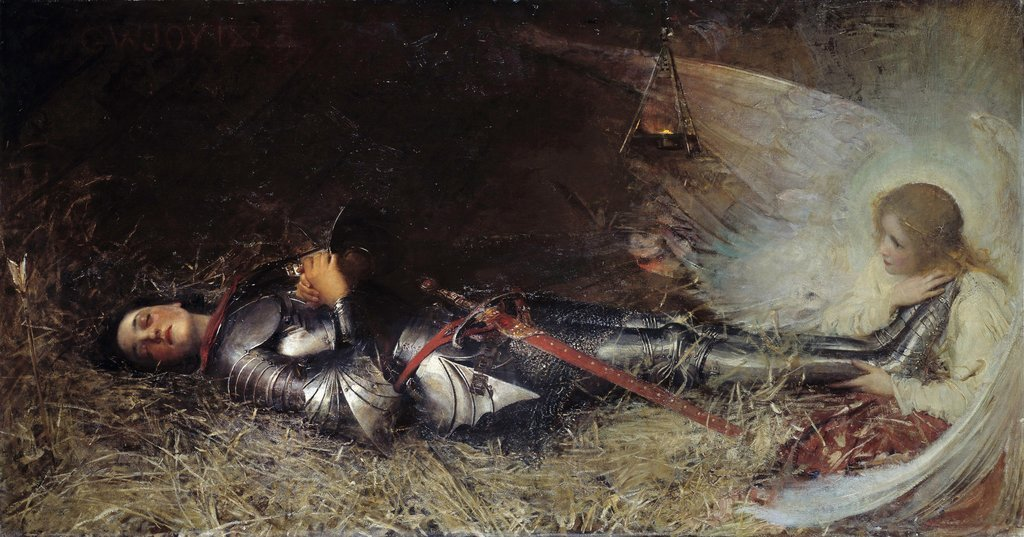
Joan of Arc by George William Joy

Dawn of Waterloo by Elizabeth Thompson

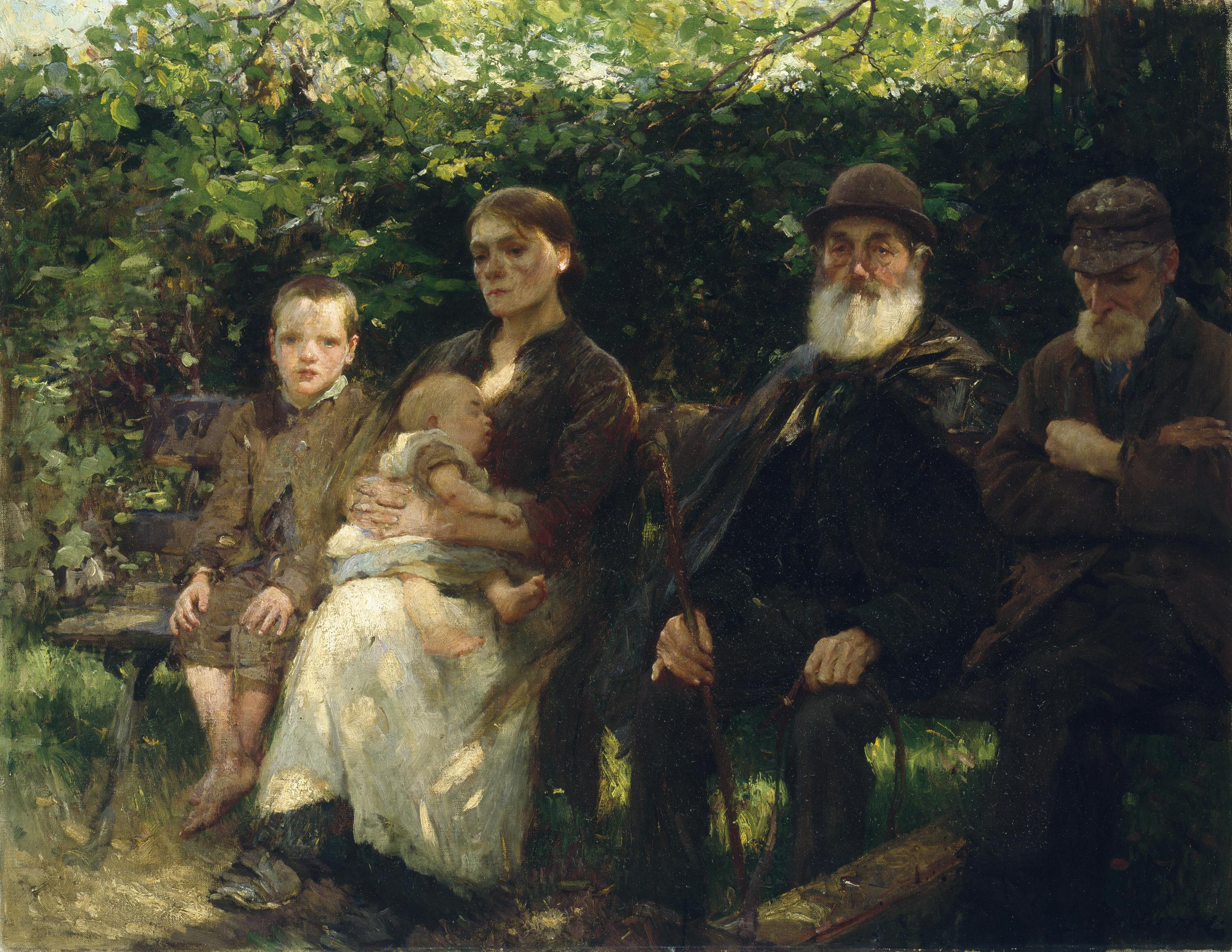
In a Dublin Park by Walter Osborne

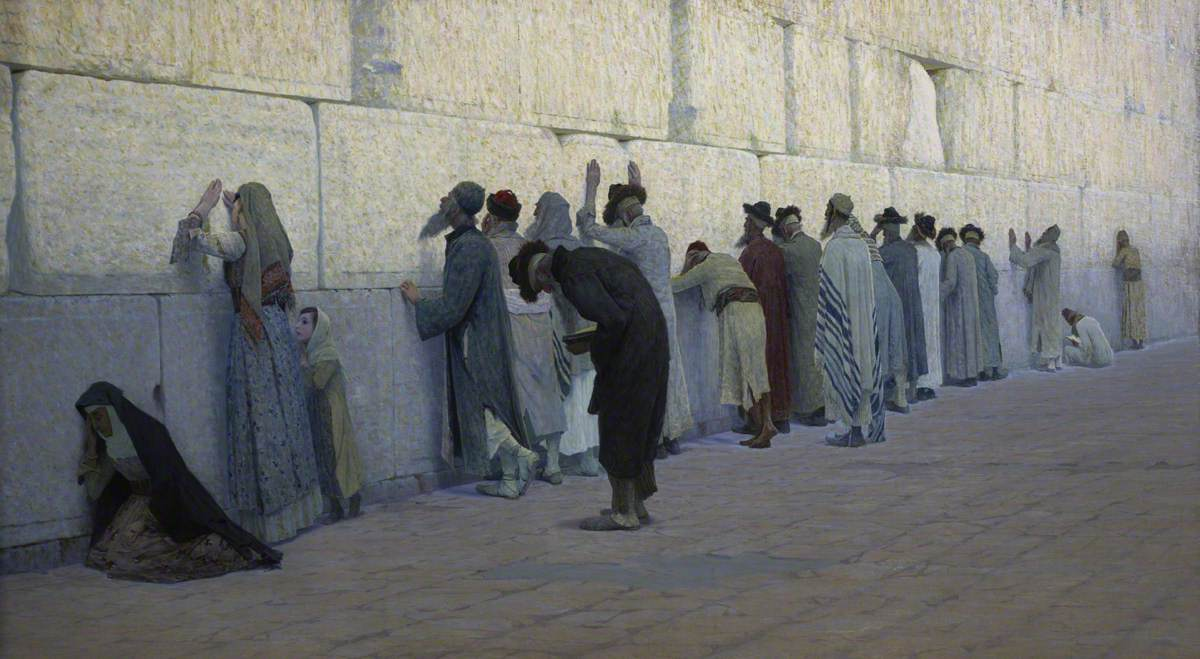
Wailing Place, Jerusalem by George Sherwood Hunter

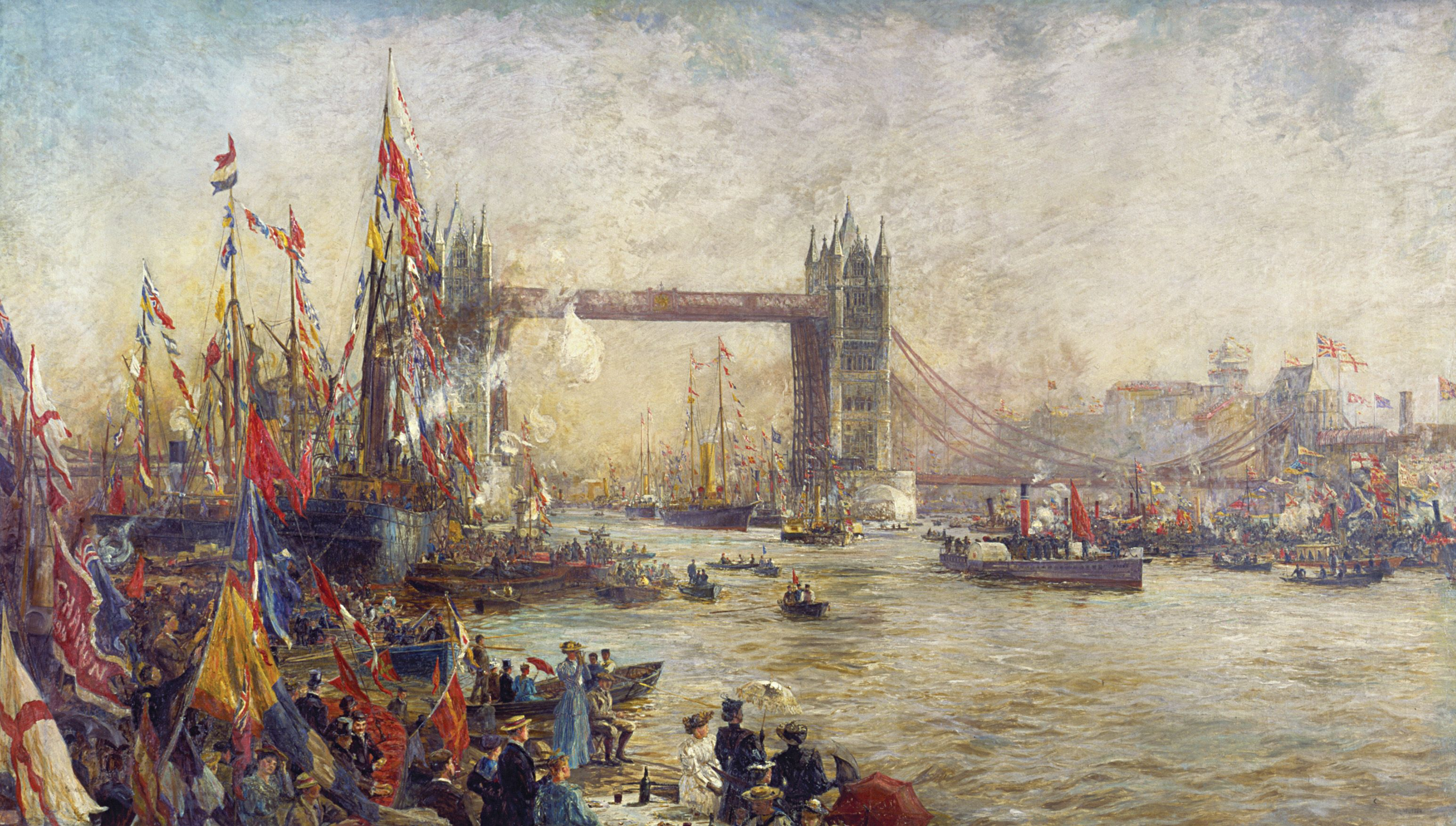
The Opening of Tower Bridge by William Lionel Wyllie

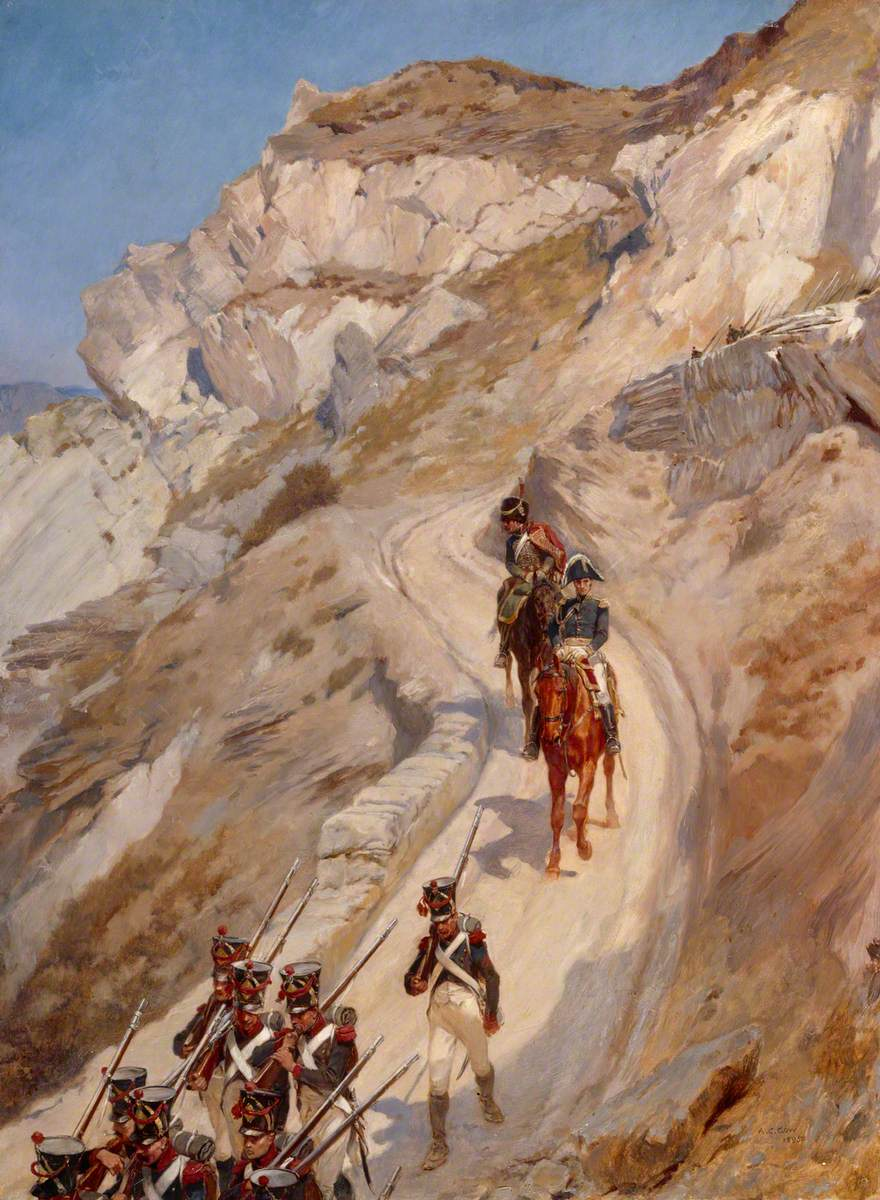
A Mountain Pass by Andrew Carrick Gow

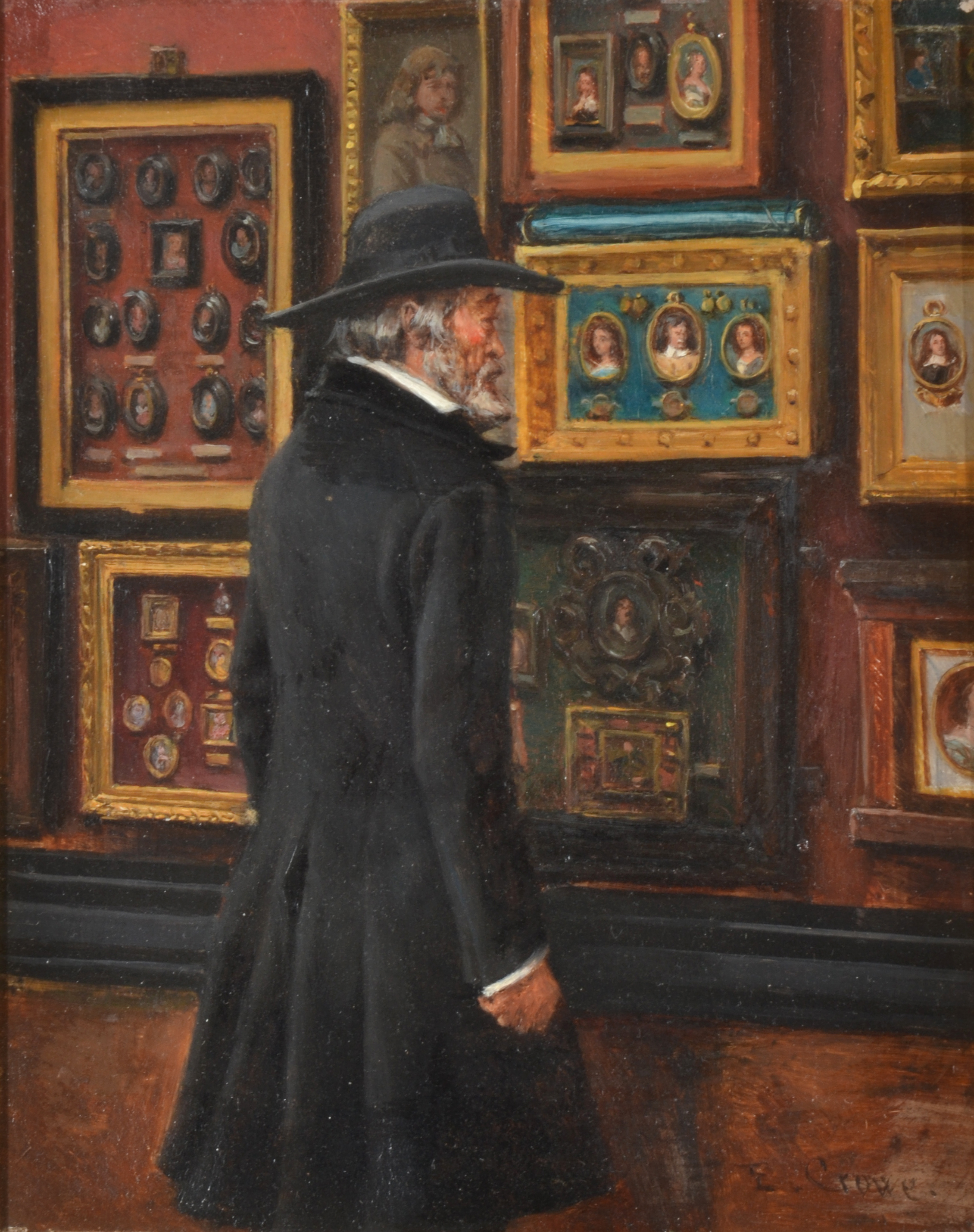
Thomas Carlyle Looking at the Duke of Buccleuch's Miniatures by Eyre Crowe

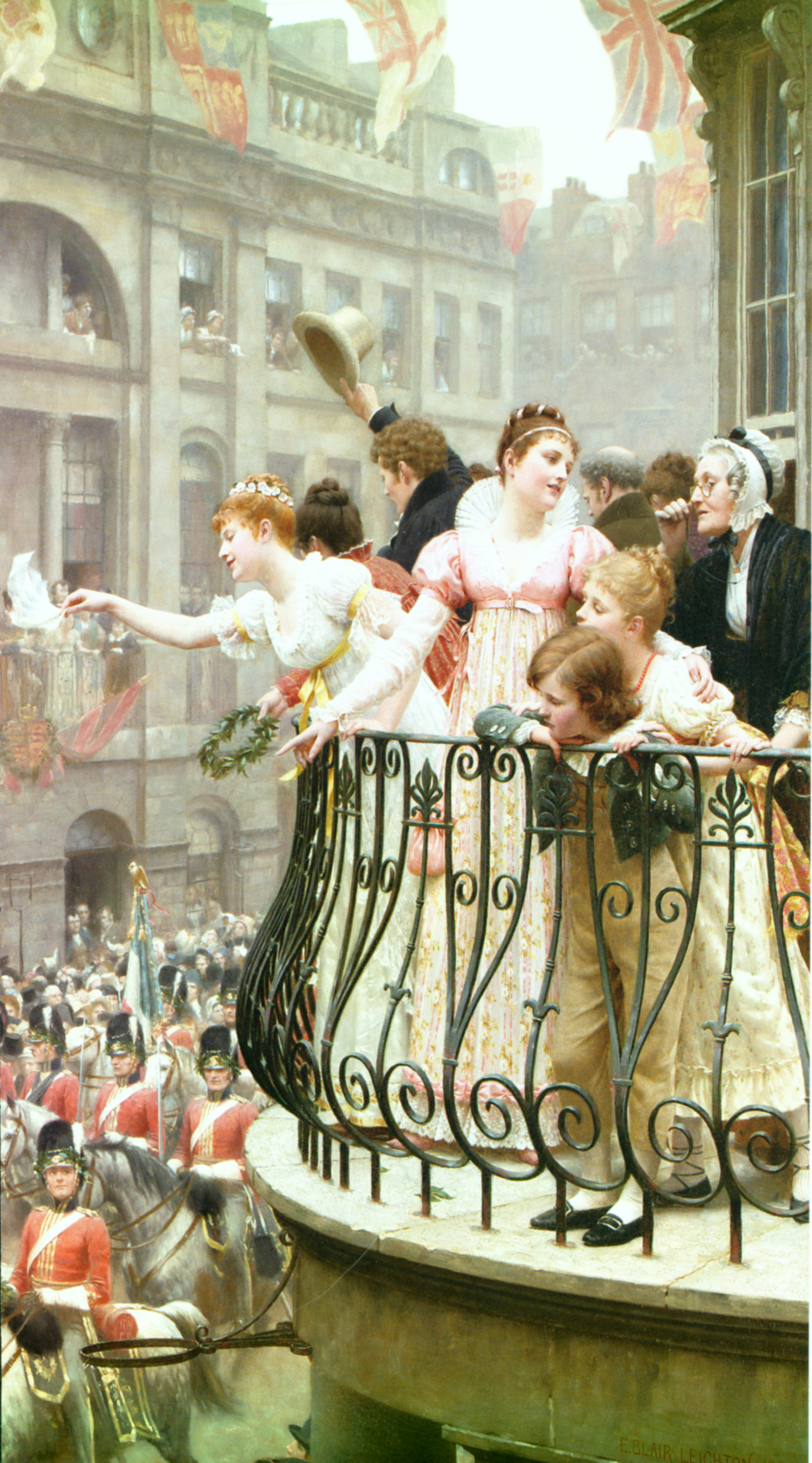
In 1816 by Edmund Leighton

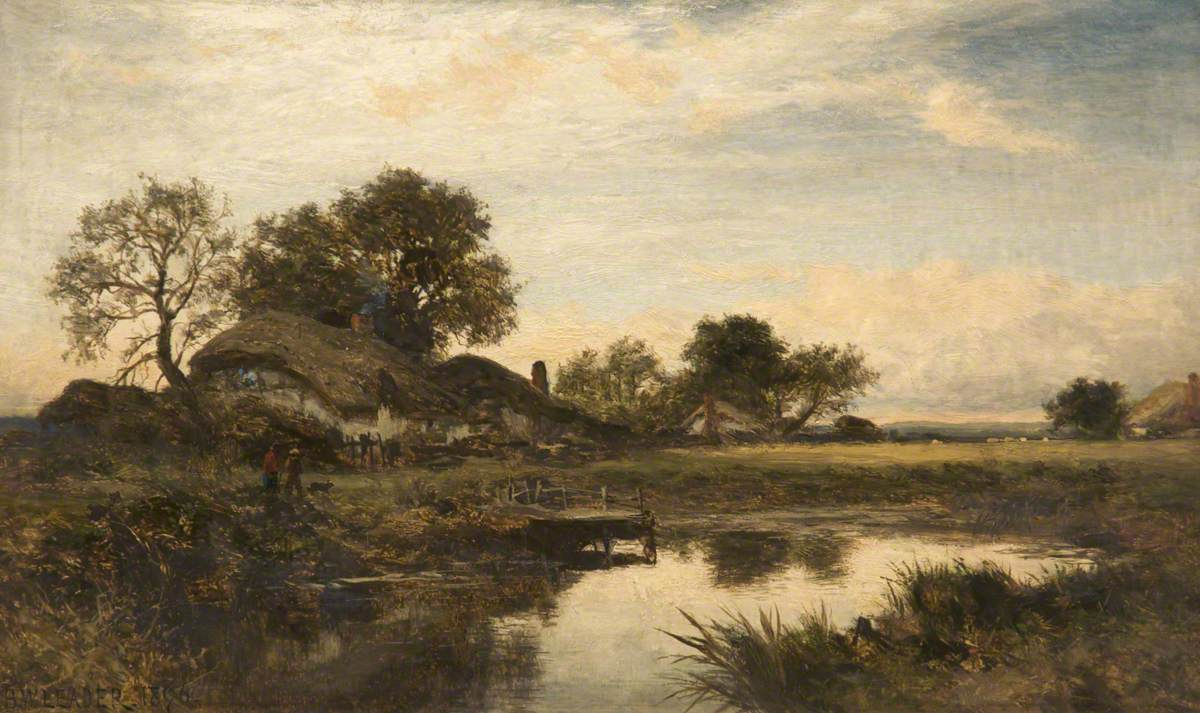
English Cottage Homes by Benjamin Williams Leader

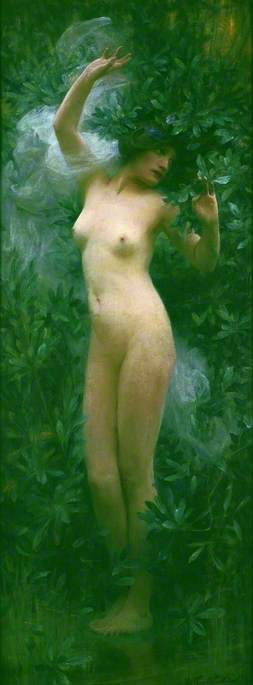
Daphne by Arthur Hacker

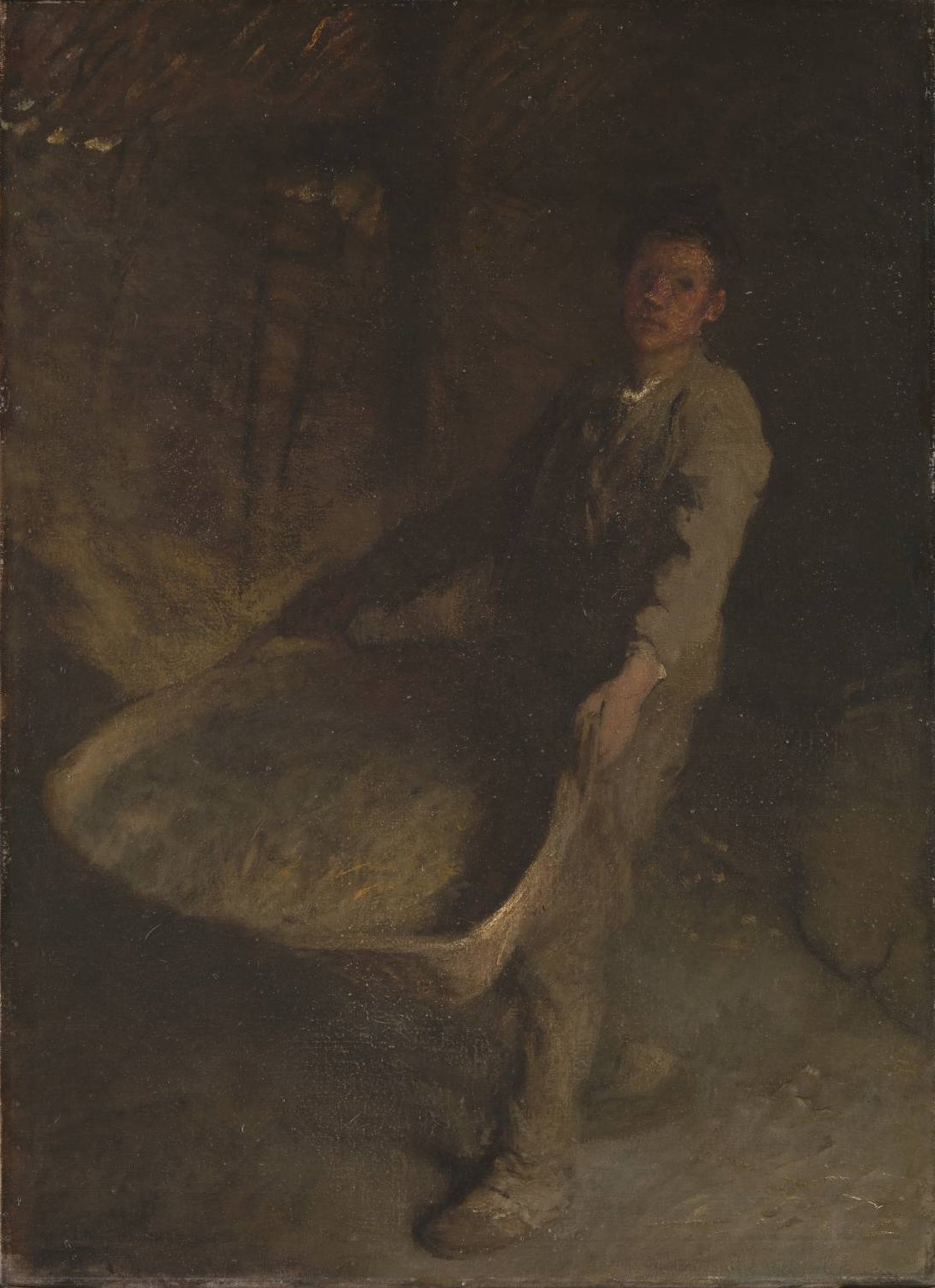
The Farmer's Boy by George Clausen

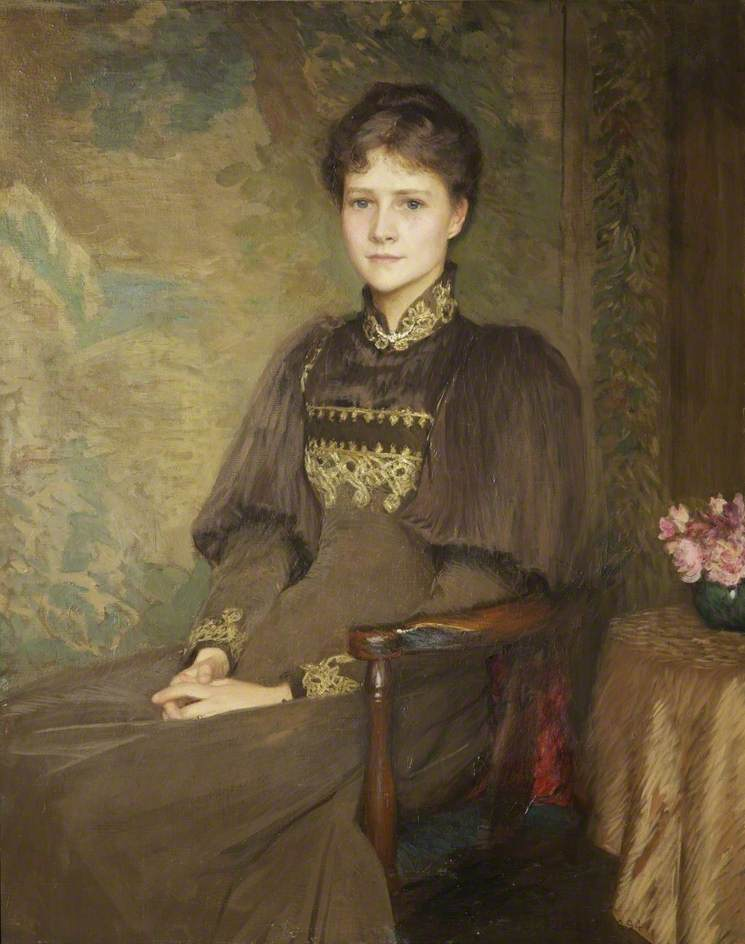
Mrs. Roberts by George Clausen

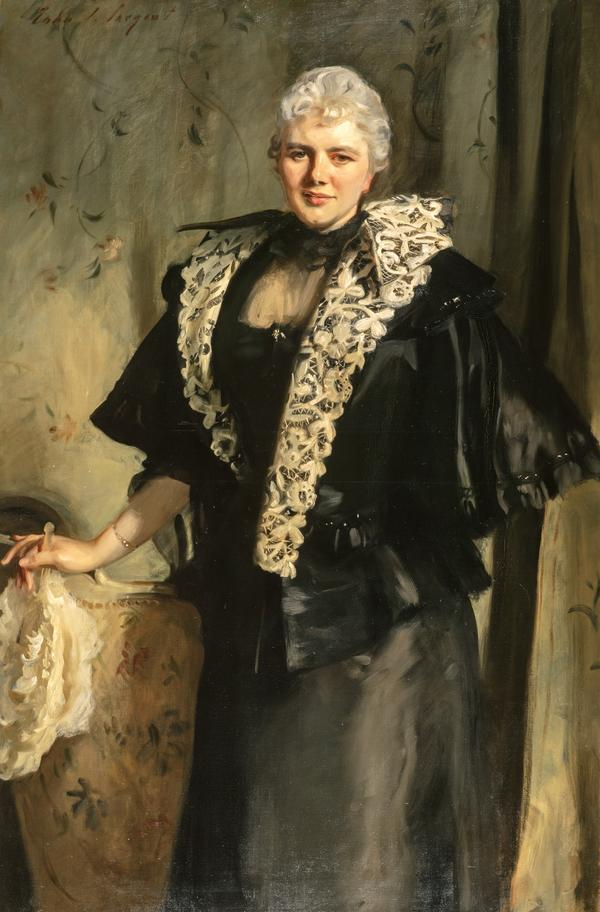
Mrs. Hills by John Singer Sargent

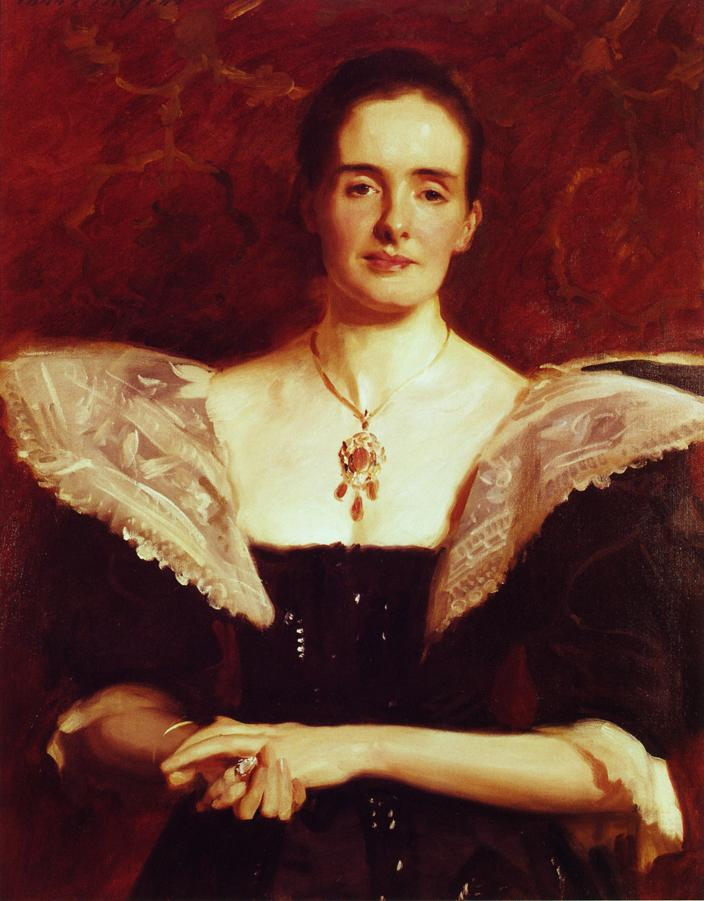
Mrs. Cooke by John Singer Sargent

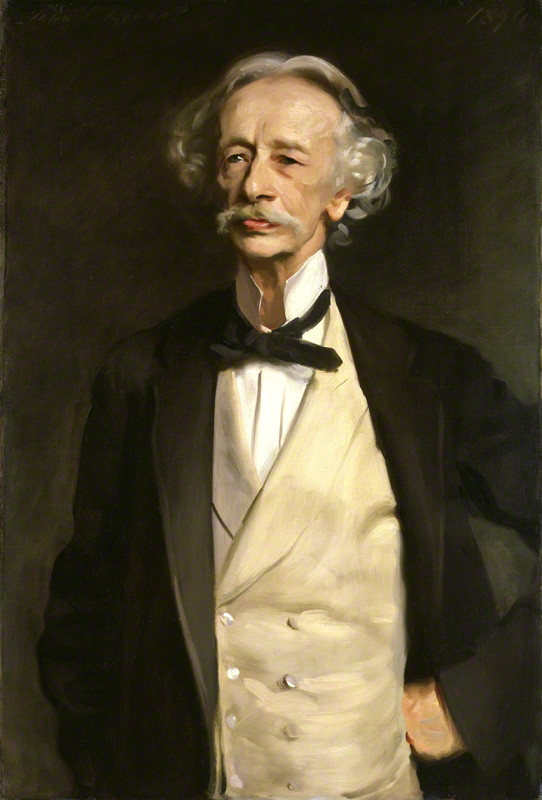
Coventry Patmore by John Singer Sargent

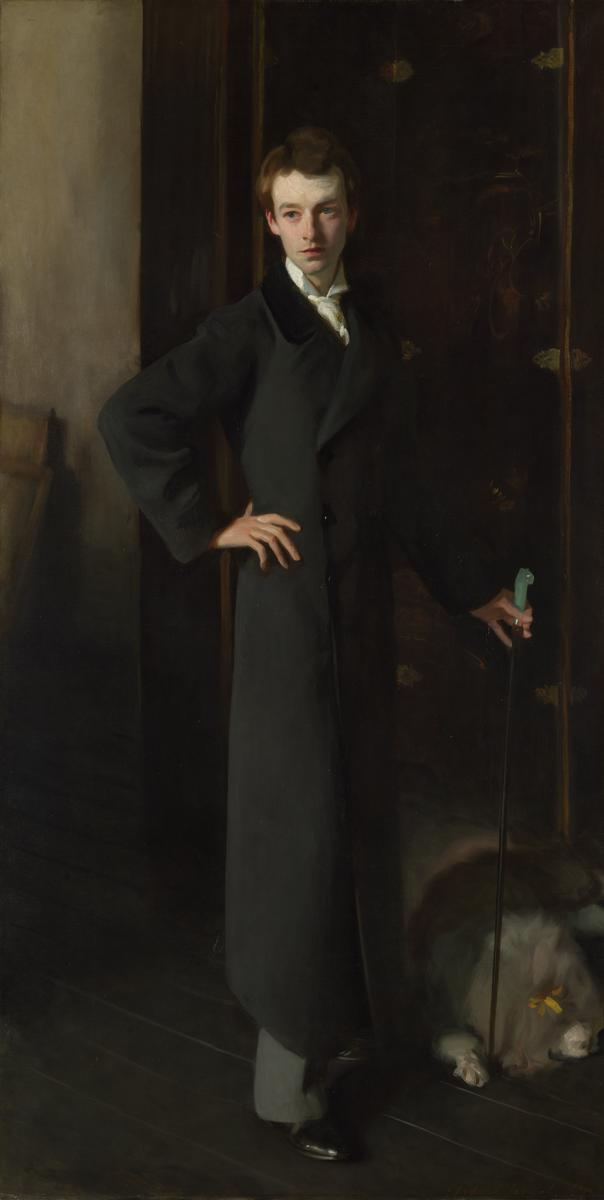
Walford Graham Robertson by John Singer Sargent

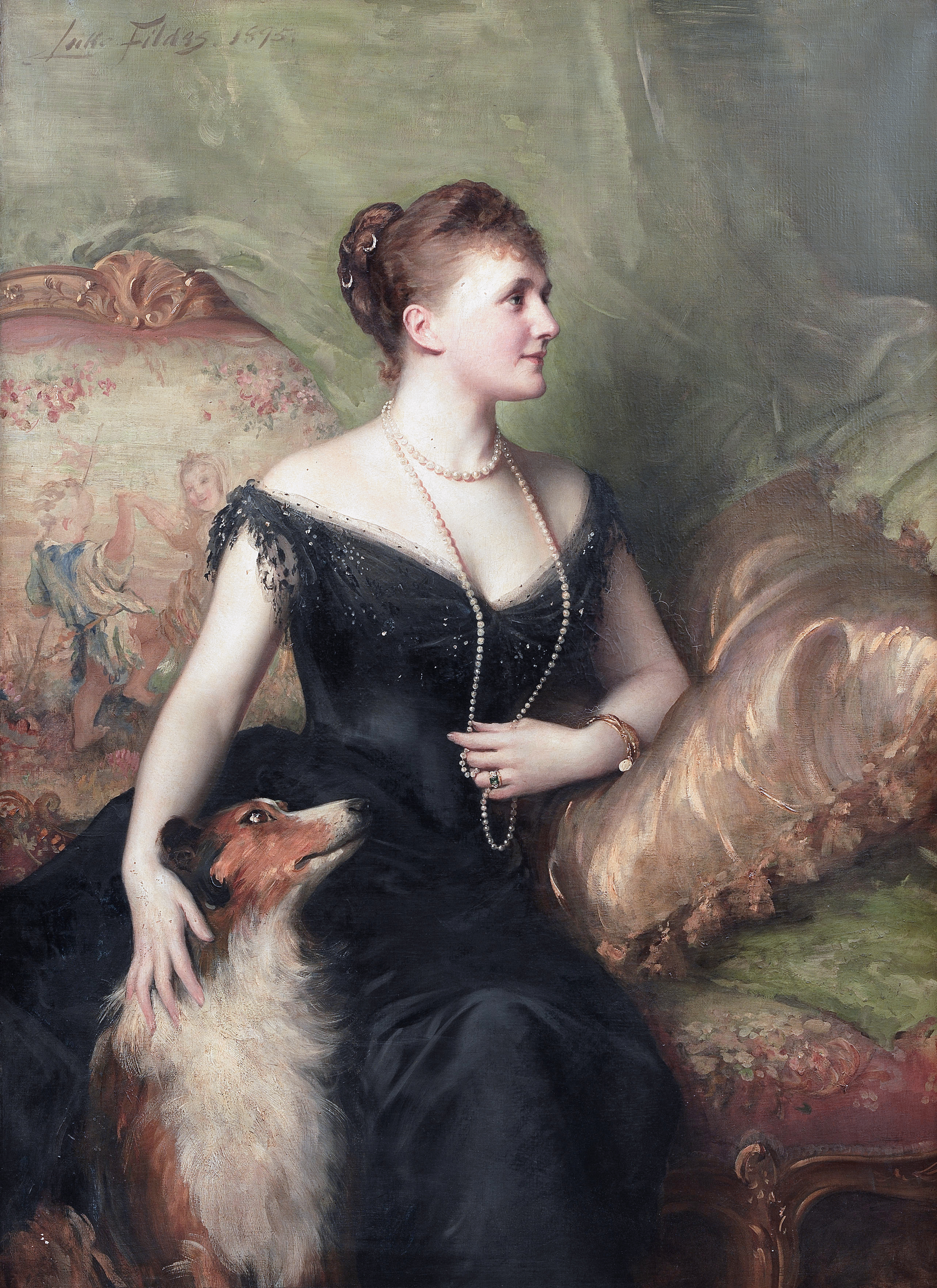
Mrs. James by Luke Fildes

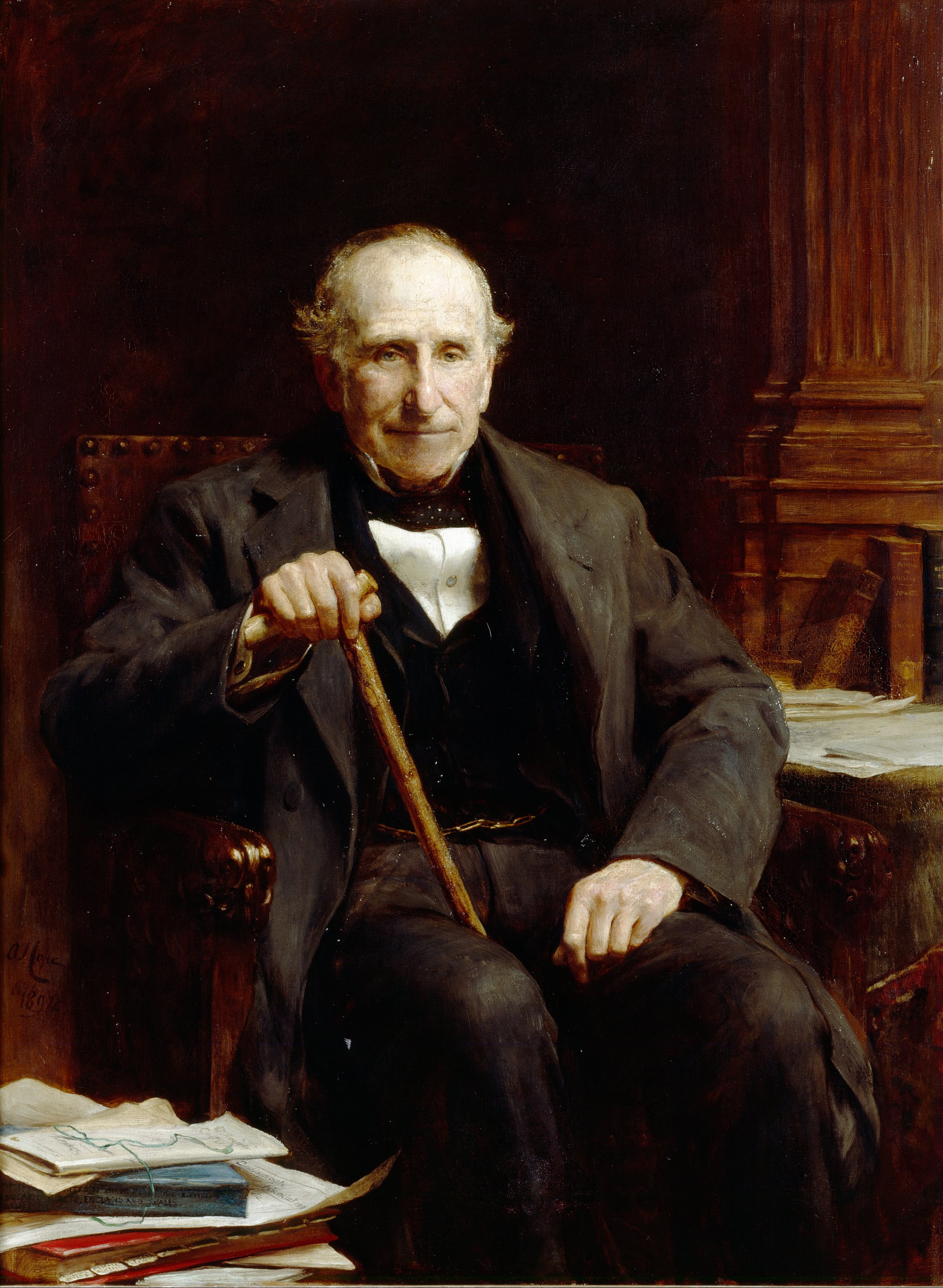
William Rogers by Arthur Stockdale Cope

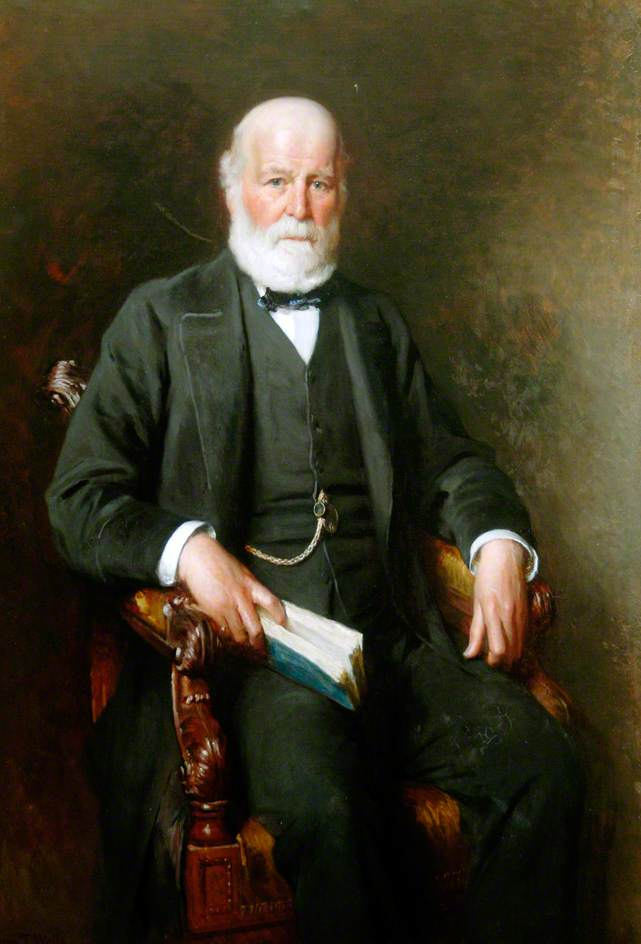
Lowthian Bell by Henry Tanworth Wells

== Bibliography ==
- Freeman, Nicholas. 1895: Drama, Disaster and Disgrace in Late Victorian Britain. Edinburgh University Press, 2011.
- Toll, Simon. Herbert Draper, 1863-1920: A Life Study. Antique Collectors' Club, 2003.
