= Dawn of Waterloo =

1895 painting by Elizabeth Thompson

- Artist: Elizabeth Thompson, Lady Butler
- Year: 1895
- Type: Oil on canvas, history painting
- Dimensions: 127 cm × 196 cm (50 in × 77 in)
- Location: National Army Museum, London

Dawn of Waterloo is an 1895 history painting by the British artist Elizabeth Thompson, Lady Butler. It depicts a scene at dawn on, 18 June 1815 the morning of the Battle of Waterloo. Men of the Scots Greys are awakened by trumpeters sounding reveille.

It could be considered a prequel to her celebrated 1881 work Scotland Forever! which shows the regiment in full motion as they charge the French lines. Butler was known for her depictions of British military history. Often the paintings, such as this one, had a poignant edge. Many of the men shown being roused would be killed in action that day. It was displayed at the Royal Academy Exhibition of 1895 held at Burlington House. Today the painting is in the collection of the National Army Museum in Chelsea, having been acquired in 2021. The Museum also holds eight preliminary sketches produced by Butler while working on the painting.

== Bibliography ==
- Kestner, Joseph A. Masculinities in Victorian Painting. Scolar Press, 1985.
- Morris, Edward. Elizabeth Thompson. Liverpool University Press, 2001.
- Usherwood, Paul & Spencer-Smith, Jenny. Lady Butler, Battle Artist, 1846-1933. Sutton, 1987.
