= The Opening of Tower Bridge =

Painting by William Lyon Wyllie

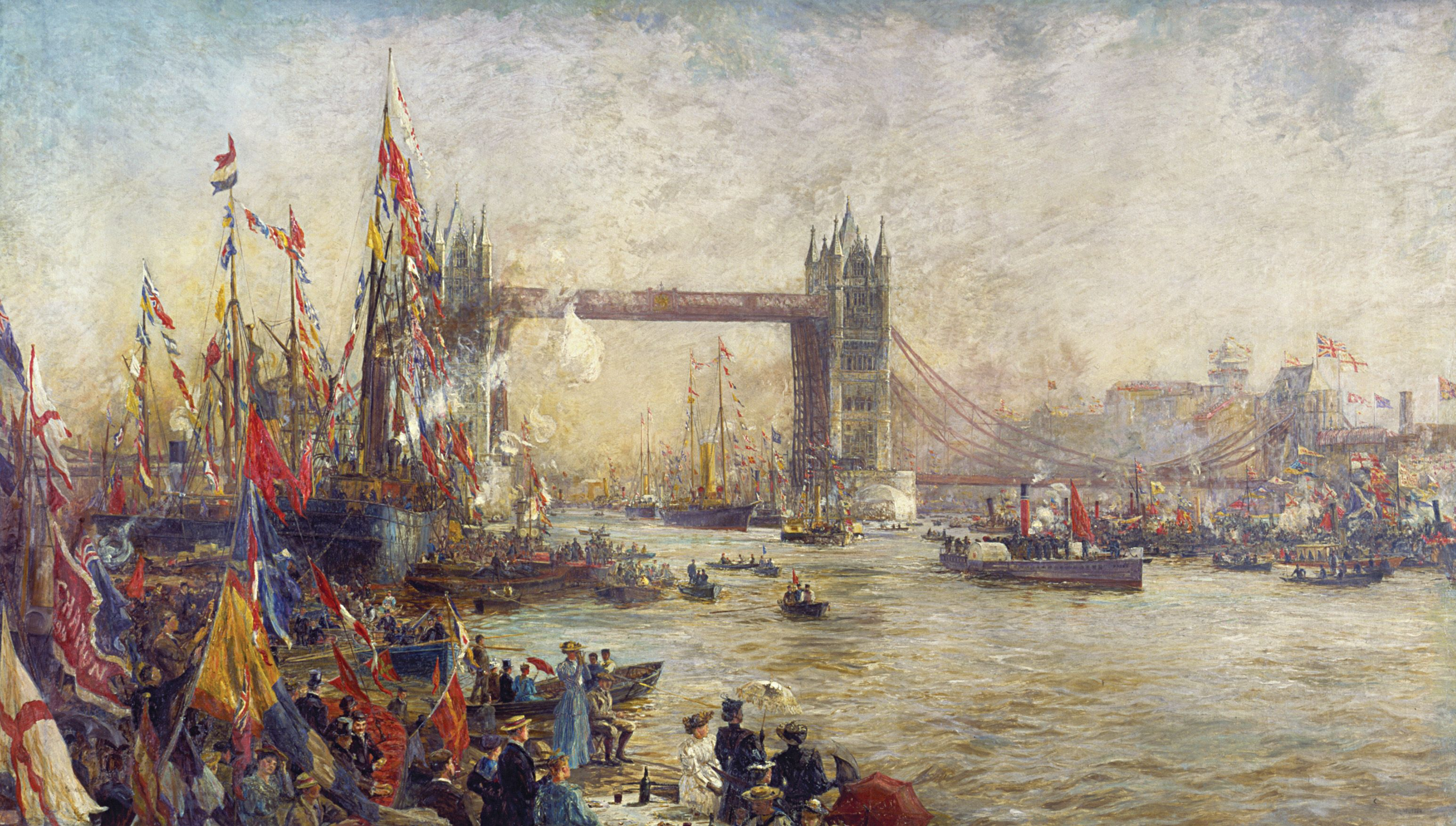
- Artist: William Lionel Wyllie
- Year: 1895
- Medium: Oil on canvas
- Dimensions: 122 cm × 213 cm (48 in × 84 in)
- Location: Guildhall Art Gallery, London

The Opening of Tower Bridge is an 1895 painting by English painter William Lionel Wyllie.

== History and description ==
The painting depicts the ceremonial opening of Tower Bridge in London on 30 June 1894. The ceremony was considered to be a significant event in London, described as a "semi-State" occasion. Displayed at the Royal Academy Exhibition of 1895, the exhibition's catalogue listed the painting with the following quote regarding the opening:

Obedient to the Prince's touch, the ponderous bascules, like the arms of a giant awaking, reared themselves into the air, and the craft adorned with flags innumerable, crowded through in a long triumphal procession, whilst the roaring of hoarse-throated sirens, the clang of bells, and boom of cannon proclaimed the great Tower Bridge open.

The bridge become one of Wyllie's favoured subjects. "London's Water Gate", a similar painting which also depicts Tower Bridge and also displayed at the 1895 exhibition was given to the architect of the bridge, John Wolfe Barry, beginning a lifetime friendship and making Barry one of Wyllie's top clients. The painting is held in the Guildhall Art Gallery collection.
