= Napoleon on the Sands at Boulogne =

Painting by Andrew Carrick Gow

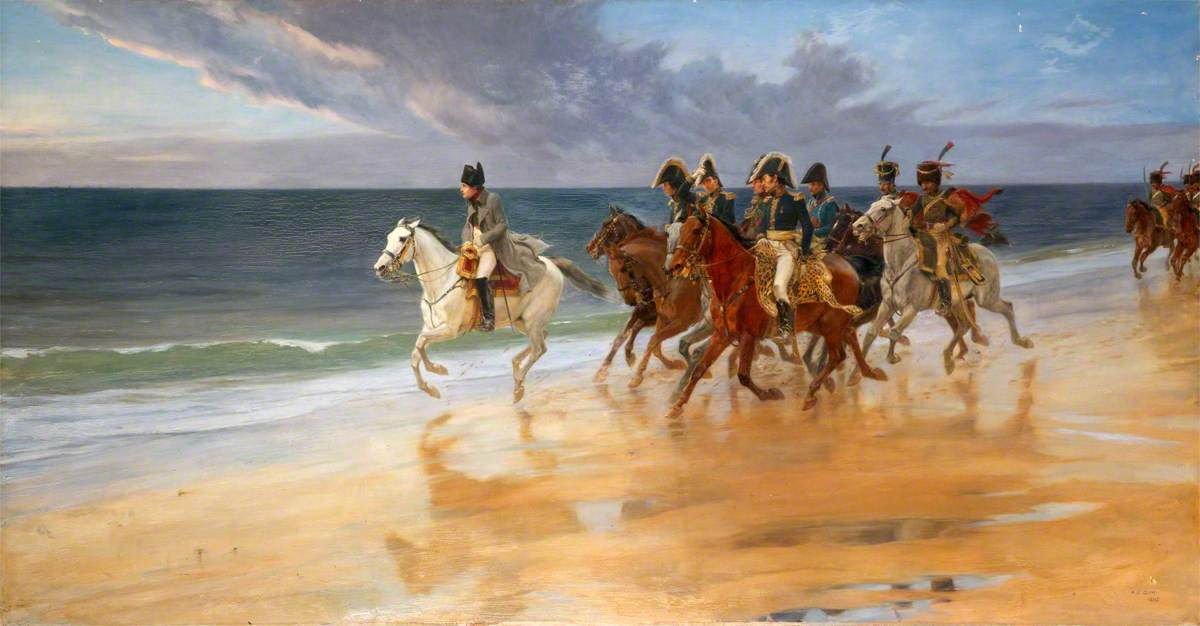
- Artist: Andrew Carrick Gow
- Year: 1895
- Type: Oil on canvas, history painting
- Dimensions: 65.5 cm × 125.5 cm (25.8 in × 49.4 in)
- Location: Gallery Oldham, Greater Manchester

Napoleon on the Sands at Boulogne is an 1895 oil painting by the British artist Andrew Carrick Gow. A history painting it depicts the French Emperor with senior subordinates and staff officers riding along the beach at Boulogne-sur-Mer in 1805 during the Napoleonic Wars. Planning to launch an invasion of Britain Napoleon assembled the Grande Armée at the Camp of Boulogne. However, unable to gain naval supremacy over the English Channel he ultimately abandoned the attempt.

The picture was displayed at the Royal Academy Exhibition of 1895 held at Burlington House in London. It was subsequently acquired by what is now Gallery Oldham in Greater Manchester in 1898 directly from the artist and remains part of the collection.

== Bibliography ==
- Harrington, Peter. British Artists and War: The Face of Battle in Paintings and Prints, 1700-1914. Greenhill Books, 1993.
