= Northeaster (painting) =

19th-century painting by Winslow Homer

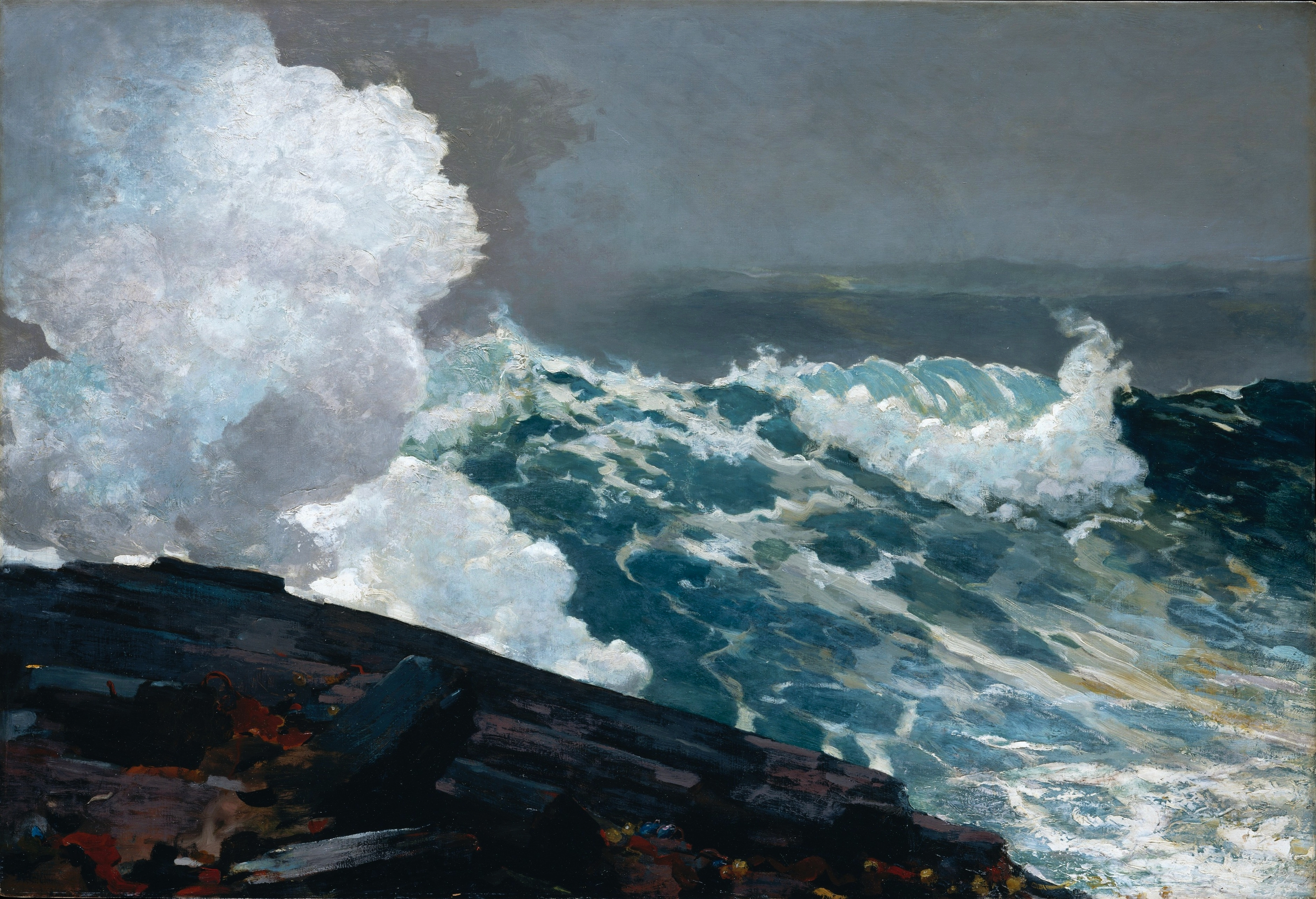
- Artist: Winslow Homer
- Year: 1895
- Medium: Oil on canvas
- Dimensions: 87.6 cm × 128 cm (34.5 in × 50 in)
- Location: Metropolitan Museum of Art, New York City, US
- Accession: 10.64.5
- Website: www.metmuseum.org/collection/the-collection-online/search/11130

Northeaster is one of several paintings on marine subjects by the late-19th-century American painter Winslow Homer. Like The Fog Warning and Breezing Up, he created it during his time in Maine. It is on display in the Metropolitan Museum of Art in New York. Viewers are presented a struggle of elements between the sea and the rocky shore. Winslow Homer excelled in painting landscape paintings that depicted seascapes and mountain scenery.

== Background and description ==
After extensive travel, Homer settled in Prouts Neck, Maine. He had a studio built for him, which was completed in 1884, and painted marine subjects, including the hard lives of the fishermen and their families. He increasingly chose to depict the sea itself, and was especially attracted to stormy seas. During this period he painted a wide array of seascapes such as The Gulf Stream (1899), Moonlight – Wood's Island Light (1886), Northeaster and Cannon Rock (both 1895) and Early Morning After a Storm at Sea (1902). Many of his paintings depict the battlefront of the sea and the shore, and the waves crashing onto the rocky shore. It has been said that they "are among the strongest expressions in all art of the power and dangerous beauty of the sea". Northeaster shows the waves while the Northeaster blows. Northeasters are storms along the upper East Coast of the United States that derive their name from the direction of the wind as it rotates onto land. The painting dates from 1895, but Homer reworked it by 1901.

== Provenance ==
Northeaster was at M. Knoedler and Company of New York in 1895 and then in 1895–96 with Thomas B. Clarke, also in New York. It was then returned to Homer in Maine. In 1900 it was again with Knoedler. From 1901 to 1910 it was owned by George A. Hearn, also of New York, who gave it to the Metropolitan Museum.

== See also ==
- List of paintings by Winslow Homer
