= Stony =

Stony may refer to:

== Places ==
- Stony Brook (disambiguation)
- Stony Creek (disambiguation)
- Stony Lake (disambiguation)
- Stony River (disambiguation)
- Stony Island (disambiguation)
- Stony Point (disambiguation)
- Stony Mountain (Missouri)
- Stony Down, a hill and an area of forested countryside in the county of Dorset, England
- Stony Pass, a mountain pass in the San Juan Mountains of southwest Colorado

== Other uses ==
- Stony (rapper) (born 1995), Icelandic actor and rapper
- Stony Awards, also known as "the Stonys", recognizing the "highest and stoniest" movies and TV shows of the year
- Stony Stratford, or "Stony", part of Milton Keynes

== See also ==
- Stoney (disambiguation)
- Stonys, a Lithuanian family name
