= Stones River (disambiguation) =

The Stones River is a river in Tennessee.

Stones River may also refer to:

- Battle of Stones River
- Stones River Campaign
- Stones River National Battlefield, in Rutherford County, Tennessee
- Stones River Greenway Arboretum, in Murfreesboro, Tennessee

== See also ==
- Stony River (disambiguation)
