= Stony Mountain =

Stony Mountain may refer to:

- Stony Mountain (Colorado), a summit in Ouray County, Colorado
- Stony Mountain, Manitoba, a community in Canada
- Stony Mountain (Missouri), a summit in Missouri
