= Stoney =

Stoney may refer to:

== Places ==
- Stoney, Kansas, an unincorporated community in the United States
- Stoney Creek (disambiguation)
- Stoney Pond, a man-made lake located by Bucks Corners, New York
- Stoney (lunar crater)
- Stoney (Martian crater)
- A nickname for Stonehaven, a town in north-east Scotland

== Arts and entertainment ==
- the title character of Stoney Burke, an American TV series
- the Stoney family, fictional characters in Blackstone, a Canadian TV series

=== Music ===
- Stoney (album), by Post Malone
- "Stoney", a song by Lobo from the 1973 album Calumet
- "Stoney", a song by Lil Yachty from the 2018 album Nuthin' 2 Prove

== People ==
- Stoney (name), a list of people with the given name, nickname, stage name or surname
- Stoney (musician), British musician Mark Stoney (born 1980)
- Stoney, or Shaun Murphy (singer), American singer-songwriter
- Nakoda (Stoney), an indigenous people in both Canada and the United States

== Other uses ==
- Stoney (drink), a soft drink sold in Africa
- Stoney language, a Siouan language spoken in Canada
- Assiniboine language, also known as Stoney, a Nakotan language of the Northern Plains of Canada and the United States

== See also ==
- Stoney units, a system of natural units
- Old Frankfort Stone High School, nicknamed Old Stoney, a historic American high school building
- Stony (disambiguation)
- Stone (disambiguation)
