= Stony River =

Stony River may refer to the following:

Rivers:

- Stony River (Alaska), USA
- Stony River (Minnesota), USA
- Stony River (West Virginia), USA
- Stony River (Jamaica)
- Stony River (Canterbury), in the South Island of New Zealand
- Stony or Hangatahua River, Taranaki, New Zealand
- Stony or Te Wharau River, in the South Island of New Zealand

Places:

- Stony River, Alaska, a census-designated place
- Stony River Township, Minnesota, a township

== See also ==
- Stones River (disambiguation)
