= Stony Point =

Stony Point or Stoney Point may refer to:

== Australia ==
- Stony Point railway line, Melbourne
  - Stony Point railway station
- Stony Point, New South Wales, Australia
- Stony Point (Homestead), a historic homestead in Darlington, Victoria.

== Canada ==
- Kettle and Stony Point Reserve, Ontario
- Stoney Point, Ontario, a hamlet in Canada

== United States ==
- Stony Point, California, former name of Lakeport, California
- Stoney Point (California), a rocky hill in Chatsworth, Los Angeles, California popular with rock climbers.
- Stoney Point, Tampa, Florida, a neighborhood in Tampa
- Stony Point, Kentucky
- Stony Point (Lexington, Kentucky), listed on the NRHP in Kentucky
- Stony Point, Michigan
- Stony Point, New York
  - Stony Point (CDP), New York, a community within the town
  - The Battle of Stony Point, a battle in the American Revolutionary War
  - Stony Point Battlefield
- Stony Point, Oklahoma
- Stony Point, North Carolina
- Stony Point (Greenwood, South Carolina), listed on the NRHP in South Carolina, in Greenwood County
- Stony Point (Surgoinsville, Tennessee), listed on the NRHP in Tennessee
- Stony Point High School in Round Rock, Texas
- Stony Point, Virginia, in Albemarle County.
- Stony Point (Richmond, Virginia), a neighborhood in Southside, Richmond, Virginia where the Stony Point Fashion Park (a regional upscale mall) is located
