= Stony Island =

Stony Island may refer to:

- Kamenny Island, Russia
- Stony Island Avenue, Chicago
  - Stony Island (film), largely set along Stony Island Avenue
  - Stony Island Arts Bank, a major nonprofit arts organization located on Stony Island Avenue
  - Stony Island station
- Stony Island, an islet in the Isles of Scilly
- Stony Island (Michigan), an island in the Detroit River
- Stony Island (Newfoundland and Labrador)
- Stony Island (New York)
- Stony Island (Western Australia), an islet off the southern shore of Western Australia

== See also ==
- Stoney Island, Nova Scotia
