= Stones River National Battlefield =

American Civil War historic place

- IUCN category III (natural monument or feature)
- Location within Tennessee Location within the United States
- Location: Rutherford County, Tennessee, United States
- Coordinates: 35°52′34″N 86°25′51″W
- Area: 709.49 acres (287.12 ha)
- Established: March 3, 1927
- Visitors: 339,364 (in 2023)
- Governing body: National Park Service
- Website: Stones River National Battlefield

Stones River National Battlefield, a 570-acre (2.3 km^{2}) park along the Stones River in Rutherford County, Tennessee, United States, three miles (5 km) northwest of Murfreesboro and twenty-eight miles southeast of Nashville, memorializes the Battle of Stones River. This key battle of the American Civil War occurred on December 31, 1862, and January 2, 1863, and resulted in a strategic Union victory.

== Creation of the National Battlefield ==
The national battlefield was established through the efforts of both private individuals, the Stones River Battlefield and Park Association, the Nashville, Chattanooga and St. Louis Railway (which became part of CSX Transportation through several mergers), and a 1927 act of Congress authorizing a national military park under the jurisdiction of the War Department.

During the early years of the twentieth century, the railroad emphasized the battlefield as a destination to increase passenger traffic. It promoted veteran reunions and acquired parts of the battlefield as points of historical interest. In 1906, the company erected a 31-foot (9.4 m) obelisk to commemorate the January 2, 1863, position of massed Union artillery used to repel a Confederate assault on Union troops across the river.

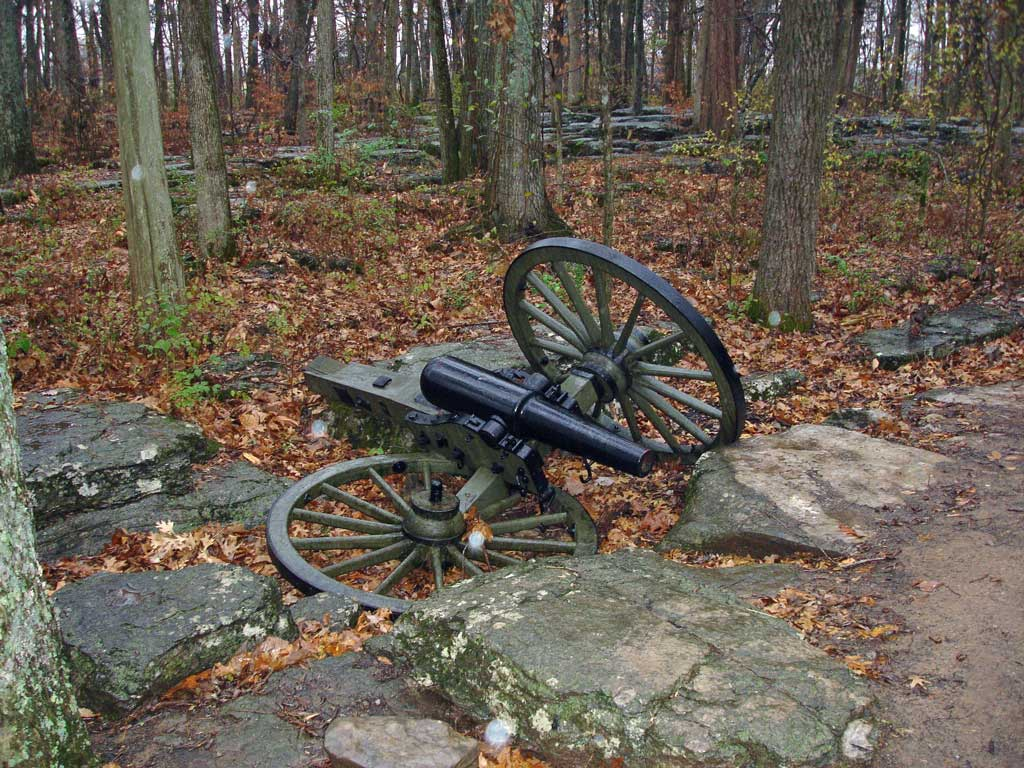
A cannon at Stones River National Battlefield

The Stones River Battlefield and Park Association was chartered on April 28, 1896, after the establishment of Chickamauga and Chattanooga National Military Park increased interest in preserving significant Civil War battlefields. The association secured options on property connected with the battle, reportedly 3,400 acres (14 km^{2}) by June 1897. Association members erected wooden signs to mark and interpret battlefield locations. In 1912, the Association lobbied to have Congress "establish an accurate system of markers", but the measure failed, in part because of the testimony of former congressman and Chickamauga and Chattanooga National Park Commissioner Charles H. Grosvenor, who believed the landmarks had been "entirely obliterated".

Land acquisition began in 1928 and was completed in 1934. In 1992, the park accepted a donation from the City of Murfreesboro of an intact segment of Fortress Rosecrans, the largest enclosed earthwork built during the Civil War. The park preserves less than a fifth of the more than 3,000 acres (12 km^{2}) over which the battle was fought.

On March 3, 1927, the site was established as Stones River National Military Park. It was transferred from the War Department to the U.S. Department of the Interior's National Park Service on August 10, 1933, and redesignated as a national battlefield on April 22, 1960. As with all historic areas administered by the National Park Service, the battlefield was listed on the National Register of Historic Places (October 15, 1966).

On April 10, 2009, the Good Friday tornado damaged the battlefield park.

Since 1997, the American Battlefield Trust and its partners have acquired and preserved 74 acres (0.30 km^{2}) of the battlefield in five acquisitions. Some of the land was sold to the National Park Service and incorporated into the national battlefield.

== Cemetery ==
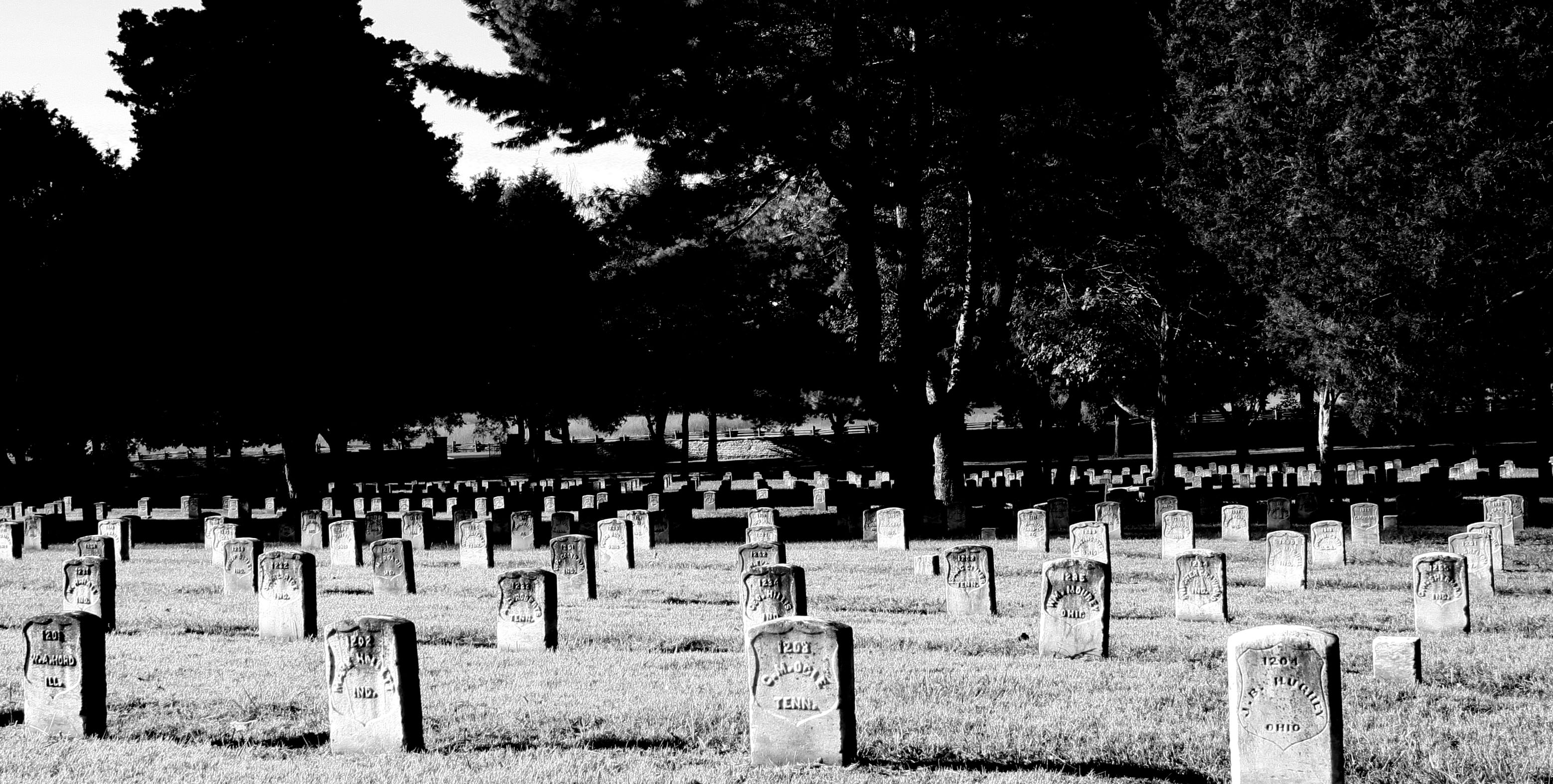
Stones River National Cemetery in Murfreesboro, Tennessee

Within park boundaries is Stones River National Cemetery, 20.09 acres (81,300 m^{2}) with 6,850 interments (2562 unidentified). Just outside the cemetery proper is the Hazen Brigade Monument (1863), the oldest surviving American Civil War monument standing in its original location. The 32nd Indiana Monument at Cave Hill National Cemetery in Louisville, Kentucky is a year older. An earlier monument was erected after the First Battle of Manassas in Virginia but is no longer extant. Also, veterans from Army of the Cumberland erected the U.S. Regular Brigade Civil War Monument.

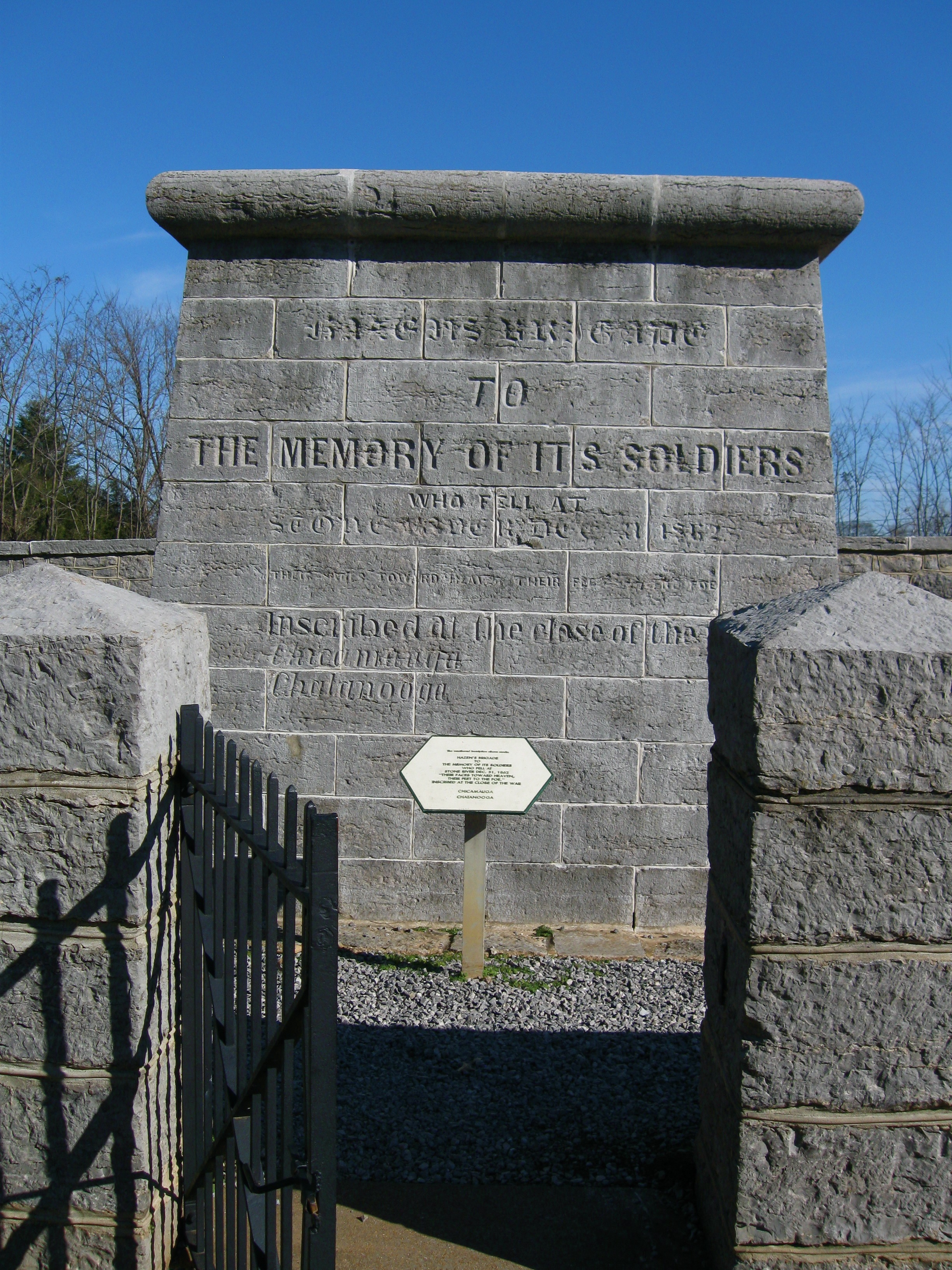
Hazen Brigade Monument

The cemetery was established on March 29, 1864, by the order of Major General George H. Thomas. Under the supervision of Chaplain William Earnshaw, the 111th Regiment United States Colored Troops disinterred bodies from the battlefields of Stones River, Murfreesboro, Franklin, Shelbyville, Tullahoma and Cowan. Reburials began in 1865 and were completed by 1867.

At the time, most of the Confederate dead were taken to their hometowns or to the nearest southern community. Some, however, were buried in a mass grave south of town. They were later reinterred in another mass grave, Confederate Circle in Evergreen Cemetery in Murfreesboro. In November 1867, the bodies of 1,360 Union soldiers were removed to Stones River from Rose Hill Cemetery in Columbia, Tennessee, where a national cemetery had earlier been planned.

The cemetery was transferred from the War Department to the National Park Service on August 10, 1933.
