= Battle of Stones River =

Major battle of the American Civil War

Battle of Stones River Second Battle of Murfreesboro
- Part of the Western Theater of the American Civil War
- Union troops of Negley's division routing the remnants of the Confederate army at the closing stage of the battle
Date	December 31, 1862 – January 2, 1863
Location	Near Murfreesboro, Tennessee 35°52′06.5″N 86°25′50.0″W
Result	Tactically Inconclusive; strategic Union victory due to Confederate withdrawal. See aftermath

Belligerents
United States	Confederate States

Commanders and leaders
(United States) William S. Rosecrans (United States) Alexander McCook (United States) George H. Thomas (United States) Thomas L. Crittenden (United States) David S. Stanley	(Confederate States of America) Braxton Bragg (Confederate States of America) Leonidas Polk (Confederate States of America) William J. Hardee (Confederate States of America) Joseph Wheeler

Units involved
Army of the Cumberland	Army of Tennessee

Strength
43,400 effectives	35,000 effectives

Casualties and losses
13,906 (1,677 killed 7,543 wounded 4,686 captured/missing)	11,739 (1,294 killed 7,945 wounded 2,500 captured/missing)
- Location within the state of Tennessee Stones River (the United States)

The Battle of Stones River, also known as the Second Battle of Murfreesboro, was fought from December 31, 1862, to January 2, 1863, in Middle Tennessee, as the culmination of the Stones River Campaign in the Western Theater of the American Civil War. Of the major battles of the war, Stones River had the highest percentage of casualties on both sides. The battle ended in Union victory after the Confederate army's withdrawal on January 3, largely due to a series of tactical miscalculations by Confederate Gen. Braxton Bragg, but the victory was costly for the Union army. Nevertheless, it was an important victory for the Union because it provided a much-needed boost in morale after the Union's recent defeat at Fredericksburg and also reinforced President Abraham Lincoln's foundation for issuing the Emancipation Proclamation, which ultimately discouraged European powers from intervening on the Confederacy's behalf.

Union Maj. Gen. William S. Rosecrans's Army of the Cumberland marched from Nashville, Tennessee, on December 26, 1862, to challenge Bragg's Army of Tennessee at Murfreesboro. On December 31, each army commander planned to attack his opponent's right flank, but Bragg had a shorter distance to go and thus struck first. A massive assault by the corps of Maj. Gen. William J. Hardee, followed by that of Leonidas Polk, overran the wing commanded by Maj. Gen. Alexander M. McCook. A stout defense by the division of Brig. Gen. Philip Sheridan in the right center of the line prevented a total collapse, and the Union assumed a tight defensive position backing up to the Nashville Turnpike. Repeated Confederate attacks were repulsed from this concentrated line, most notably in the cedar "Round Forest" salient against the brigade of Col. William B. Hazen. Bragg attempted to continue the assault with the division of Maj. Gen. John C. Breckinridge, but the troops were slow in arriving and their multiple piecemeal attacks failed.

Fighting resumed on January 2, 1863, when Bragg ordered Breckinridge to assault a lightly defended Union position on a hill to the east of the Stones River. Chasing the retreating Union forces, they were led into a deadly trap. Faced with overwhelming artillery, the Confederates were repulsed with heavy losses. Probably fooled by false information planted by McCook and campfires where no troops were posted, set up by Rosecrans, and thus believing that Rosecrans was receiving reinforcements, Bragg chose to withdraw his army on January 3 to Tullahoma, Tennessee. This caused Bragg to lose the confidence of the Army of Tennessee.

== Background ==
=== Military situation ===
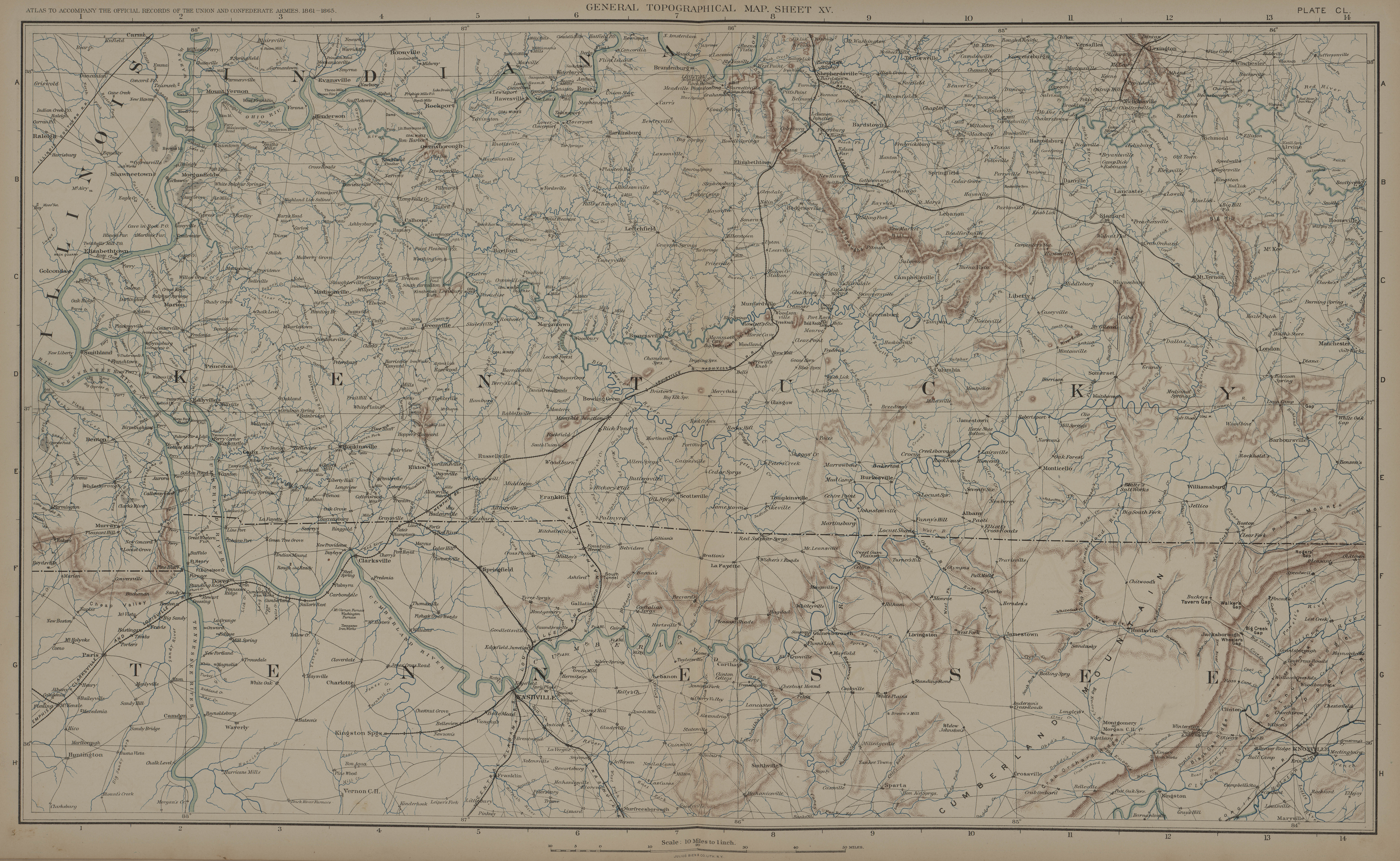
Kentucky-Tennessee, 1862

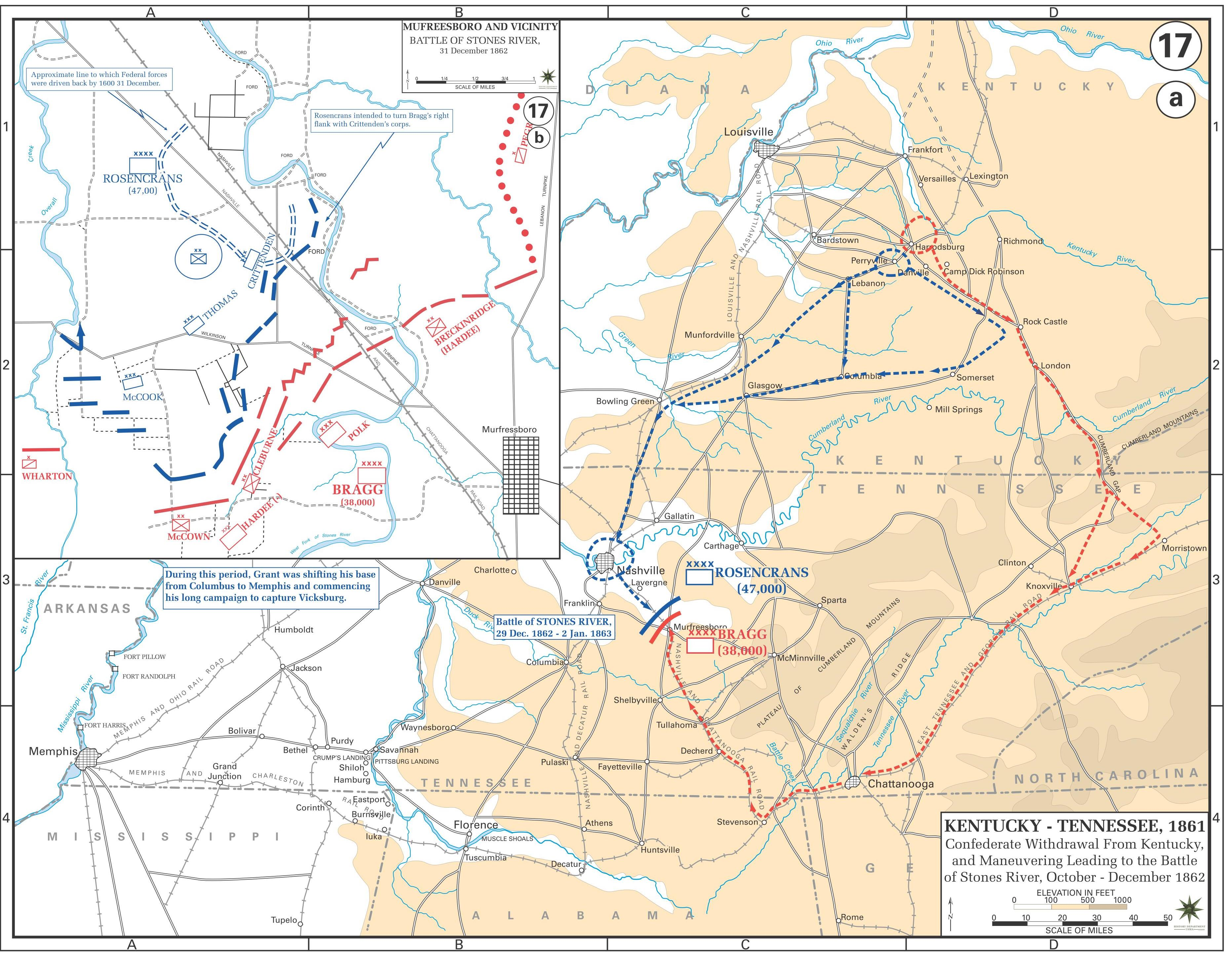
Western Theater: movements October–December 1862 (Stones River Campaign)

After the Battle of Perryville in Kentucky on October 8, 1862, Confederate Gen. Braxton Bragg's Army of Mississippi withdrew to Harrodsburg, Kentucky, where it was joined by Maj. Gen. Edmund Kirby Smith's army of 10,000 on October 10. Although Bragg's newly combined force was up to 38,000 veteran troops, he made no effort to regain the initiative. Maj. Gen. Don Carlos Buell, the Union commander at Perryville, was equally passive and refused to attack Bragg.

Frustrated with his prospects in Kentucky and low on supplies, Bragg withdrew fully from Kentucky through the Cumberland Gap, passed through Knoxville and Chattanooga, turned northwest, and eventually stopped in Murfreesboro, Tennessee. His army, joined with Smith's Army of Kentucky and together renamed the Army of Tennessee as of November 20, took up a defensive position northwest of the city along the West Fork of the Stones River. During a visit by Confederate president Jefferson Davis on December 16, Bragg was ordered to send the infantry division of Maj. Gen. Carter L. Stevenson to Mississippi to assist in the defense of Vicksburg. The loss of Stevenson's 7,500 men would be sorely felt in the coming battle. Bragg reorganized his army, and Kirby Smith left for East Tennessee.

Bragg commanded two corps, under Maj. Gen. William J. Hardee (divisions of major generals John C. Breckinridge, Patrick R. Cleburne, and John P. McCown) and Maj. Gen. Leonidas Polk (divisions of major generals Benjamin F. Cheatham and Jones M. Withers), and a cavalry command under Brig. Gen. Joseph Wheeler. Bragg had to deal with a command problem that became typical for him during the war: a virtual revolt of his senior generals, who petitioned Jefferson Davis to relieve him in favor of Gen. Joseph E. Johnston, the commander of all armies in the Western Theater. Davis refused to relieve either Bragg or the rebellious generals.

On the Union side, President Abraham Lincoln had become frustrated with Buell's passivity and replaced him with Maj. Gen. William S. Rosecrans, victor of the recent battles of Iuka and Corinth. Rosecrans moved his XIV Corps (which was soon after designated the Army of the Cumberland) to Nashville, Tennessee, and was warned by Washington that he, too, would be replaced if he did not move aggressively against Bragg and occupy eastern Tennessee. However, Rosecrans took ample time to reorganize and train his forces (particularly his cavalry) and resupply his army. He did not begin his march in pursuit of Bragg until December 26.

=== Initial movements ===
While Rosecrans was preparing in Nashville, Bragg ordered Col. John Hunt Morgan to move north with his cavalry and operate along Rosecrans's lines of communications, to prevent him from foraging for supplies north of Nashville. The Battle of Hartsville, at a crossing point on the Cumberland River about 40 miles (64 km) upstream from Nashville (north of Murfreesboro) was an incident in Morgan's raid to the north, before Rosecrans had the bulk of his infantry forces on the move. The relatively small battle that followed Morgan's surprise attack was an embarrassing Union defeat, resulting in many captured Union supplies and soldiers. The Union also engaged in a strategic cavalry raid. On December 26, the day Rosecrans marched from Nashville, a small force under Brig. Gen. Samuel P. Carter raided the upper Tennessee Valley from Manchester, Kentucky. Until January 5, Carter's men destroyed railroad bridges and fought a few skirmishes, including a serious one on December 28 at Perkins's Mill (also known as Elk Fort). But none of the cavalry raids, Confederate or Union, had any significant effect on the Stones River Campaign.

The Army of the Cumberland marched southeast the day after Christmas in three columns, or "wings", towards Murfreesboro, and they were effectively harassed by Wheeler's Confederate cavalry along the way, which delayed their movements. Although Rosecrans had reported his army to have 81,729 effectives in Nashville, his force on the march was barely more than half of that since he needed to protect his base and supply lines from the harassment of the Confederate cavalry. The left wing of 14,500 men under Maj. Gen. Thomas L. Crittenden (divisions of Brig. Gens. Thomas J. Wood, John M. Palmer, and Horatio P. Van Cleve) took a route that was parallel to the Nashville and Chattanooga Railroad, passing through La Vergne and south of Smyrna. The right wing of 16,000 men under Maj. Gen. Alexander M. McCook (divisions of Brig. Gens. Jefferson C. Davis, Richard W. Johnson, and Philip H. Sheridan) marched south along the Nolensville Turnpike to Nolensville, south to Triune, and then eastward to Murfreesboro. The center wing of 13,500 men under Maj. Gen. George Henry Thomas (divisions of Maj. Gen. Lovell H. Rousseau and Brig. Gens. James S. Negley, Speed S. Fry, and Robert B. Mitchell) moved south along the Wilson Turnpike and the Franklin Turnpike, parallel to the Nashville and Decatur Railroad, then eastward through Nolensville and along the same route used by Crittenden south of the Nashville and Chattanooga. Union cavalry under Brig. Gen. David S. Stanley (a single cavalry division under Col. John Kennett) preceded each of the three columns. The separation of the wings was designed to conduct a turning movement against Hardee at Triune, but when the U.S. march began, Bragg moved Hardee back to Murfreesboro to avoid a confrontation.

=== Geography and location ===
Murfreesboro was a small town in the Stones River Valley, a former state capital named for a colonel in the American Revolutionary War, Hardy Murfree. All through the war it was a center for strong Confederate sentiment, and Bragg and his men were warmly welcomed and entertained during the month of December. It was located in a rich agricultural region from which Bragg planned to provision his army and a position that he intended to use to block a potential Union advance on Chattanooga. Hardee noted afterward that "The field of battle offered no particular advantages for defense." Despite this, Bragg was reluctant to move farther south, say to the arguably more defensible Duck River Valley, or farther north, to Stewart's Creek, where Rosecrans thought Bragg would defend. Sensitive to the political requirements that almost no Tennessee ground be yielded to Federal control, he chose the relatively flat area northwest of the politically influential city, straddling the Stones River. Portions of the area, particularly near the intersection of the Nashville Pike and the Nashville and Chattanooga Railroad, were characterized by small but dense cedar forests, in places more impenetrable to infantry than the Wilderness of Spotsylvania in Virginia. Short limestone outcroppings, separated by narrow cracks as if rows of teeth, impeded the movement of wagons and artillery. Hardee's Corps was initially placed in Triune, about 20 miles (32 km) to the west, Polk's on the west bank of the river, and a detached division from Hardee's Corps under Maj. Gen. John C. Breckinridge on the low hills east of the river. None of the troops were ordered to construct field fortifications.

=== Disposition of armies ===
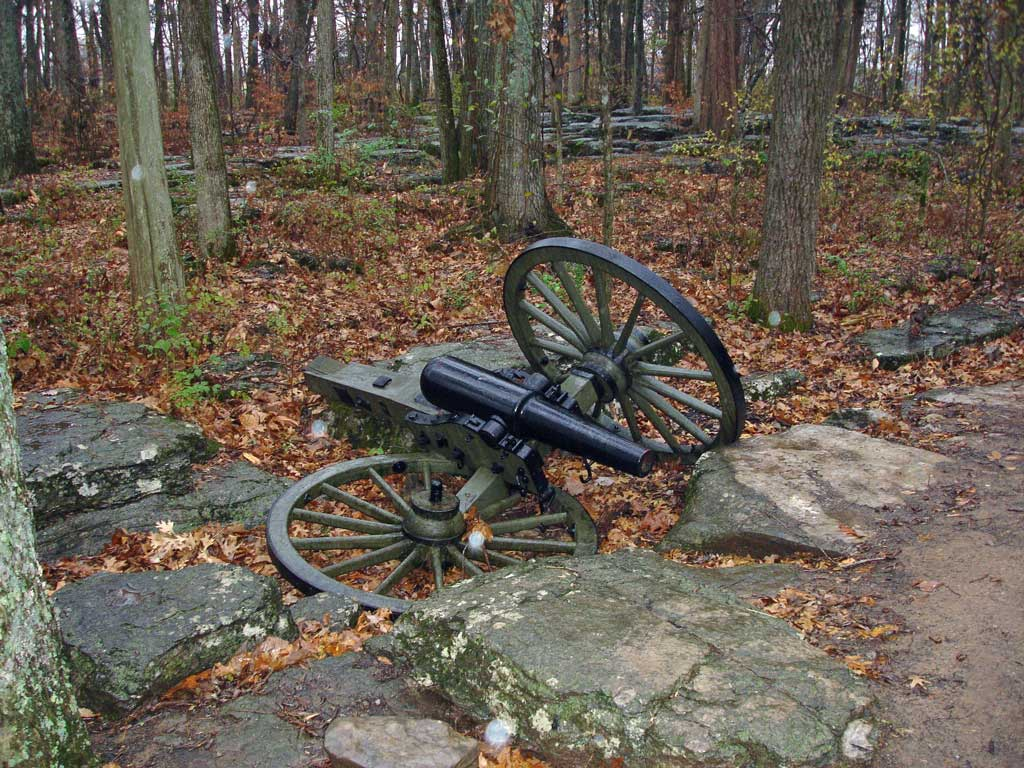
Limestone outcroppings in a cedar forest at Stones River National Battlefield, 2005

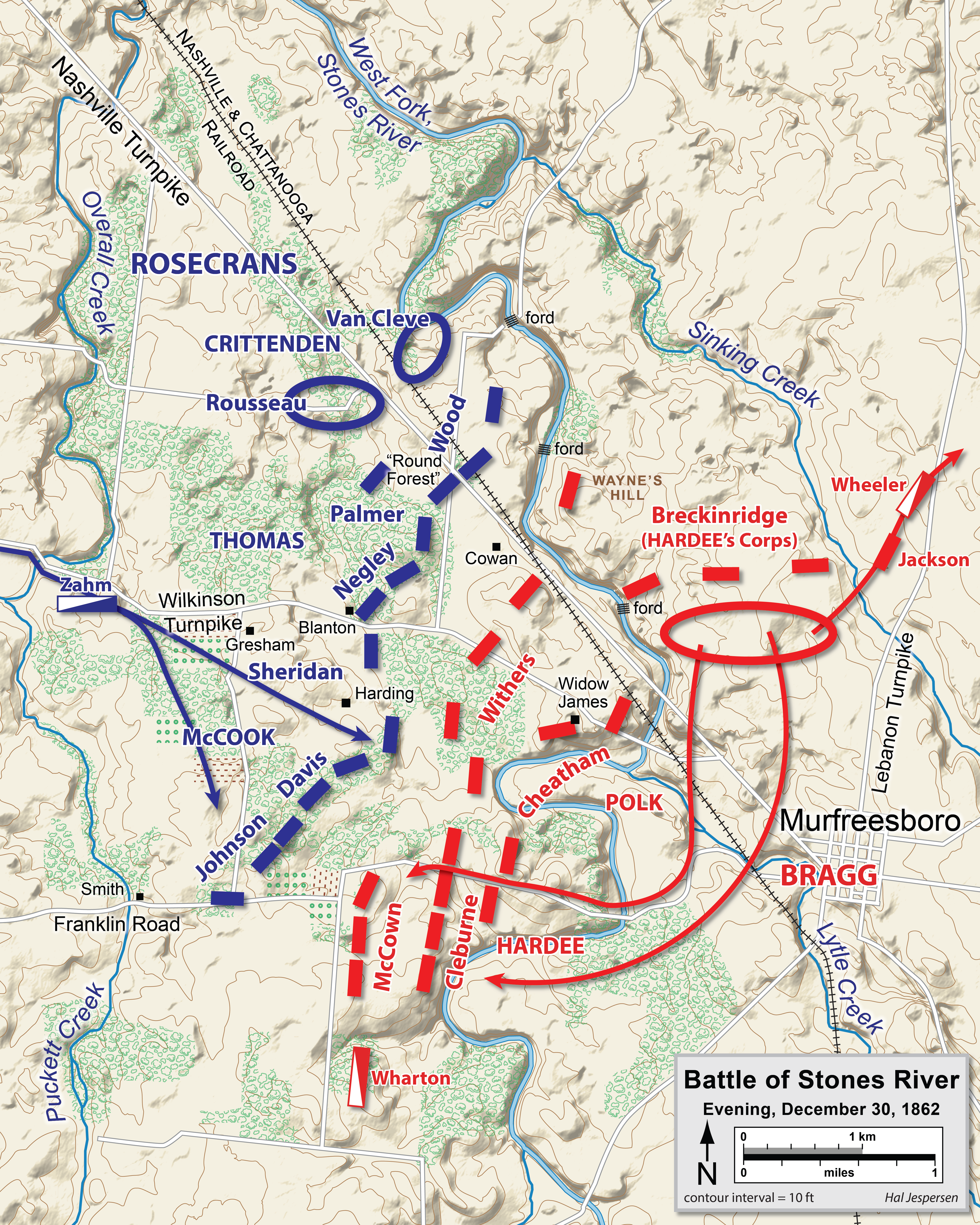
Movements and positions the night of December 30 to 31

By the time Rosecrans had arrived in Murfreesboro on the evening of December 29, the Army of Tennessee had been encamped in the area for a month. By nightfall, two thirds of Rosecrans's army was in position along the Nashville Turnpike, and by the next day Rosecrans's army numbered about 41,000 and Bragg's 35,000. The odds were closer than those figures would indicate. Bragg had the advantage of the detached, but cooperating, cavalry commands under Forrest and Morgan, who raided deeply behind Union lines while Wheeler's cavalry slowed the Union forces with hit-and-run skirmishes. (Part of Rosecrans's reluctance to move from Nashville was the inexperience of his cavalry forces in comparison to their Confederate counterparts.) On December 29, Wheeler and 2,500 of his men rode completely around the Union army, destroying supply wagons and capturing reserve ammunition in Rosecrans's trains. They captured four wagon trains and 1,000 Union prisoners.

On December 30, the Union force moved into line two miles (three km) northwest of Murfreesboro. The two armies were in parallel lines, about four miles (six km) long, oriented from southwest to northeast. Bragg's left flank was weak at the start, and Rosecrans could have attacked there when he arrived and wheeled left, around the flank and directly into the town of Murfreesboro, but he did not know the full disposition of Bragg's forces because of the skillful screening of the Confederate cavalry during the Union march. In a manner similar to the previous year's First Battle of Bull Run, both commanders devised similar plans for the following day: envelop the enemy's right, get into his rear, and cut him off from his base. Since both plans were the same, the victory would probably go to the side that was able to attack first. Rosecrans ordered his men to be ready to attack after breakfast, but Bragg ordered an attack at dawn.

Bragg's forces were situated with Leonidas Polk's corps on the west side of the river, and William J. Hardee's men on the east. He had expected Rosecrans to attack on December 30, but when that did not happen, his plan was to drive Hardee's corps and the cavalry under Brig. Gen. John A. Wharton deep into the Union rear. He began moving the bulk of Hardee's corps across the river to his left flank to prepare for the next morning's attack. This left Breckinridge's division in reserve on the east side of the river on the high ground.

=== Plans ===
Rosecrans intended to have Crittenden cross the river and attack the heights east of the river, which would be an excellent artillery platform to bombard the entire Confederate lines. However, Crittenden—facing Breckinridge on the Union left—failed to notify McCook (on the Union right) of these troop movements. McCook, anticipating the next day would begin with a major attack by Crittenden, planted numerous campfires in his area, hoping to deceive the Confederates as to his strength on that flank, and to disguise the fact that his flank was not anchored on an obstacle (the nearby Overall Creek). Thomas, in the center, was ordered to make a limited attack and act as the pivot for Crittenden's wheel.

The armies bivouacked only 700 yards (640 m) from each other, and their bands started a musical battle that became a non-lethal preview of the next day's events. Northern musicians played "Yankee Doodle" and "Hail, Columbia" and were answered by "Dixie" and "The Bonnie Blue Flag". Finally, one band started playing "Home! Sweet Home!" and the others on both sides joined in. Thousands of Northern and Southern soldiers sang the sentimental song together across the lines.

== Opposing forces ==
Source: Official Records, Series I, Volume XX, Part 1, pages 174–182, 207–217, 1093–1099

=== Union ===
Key commanders (Army of the Cumberland)
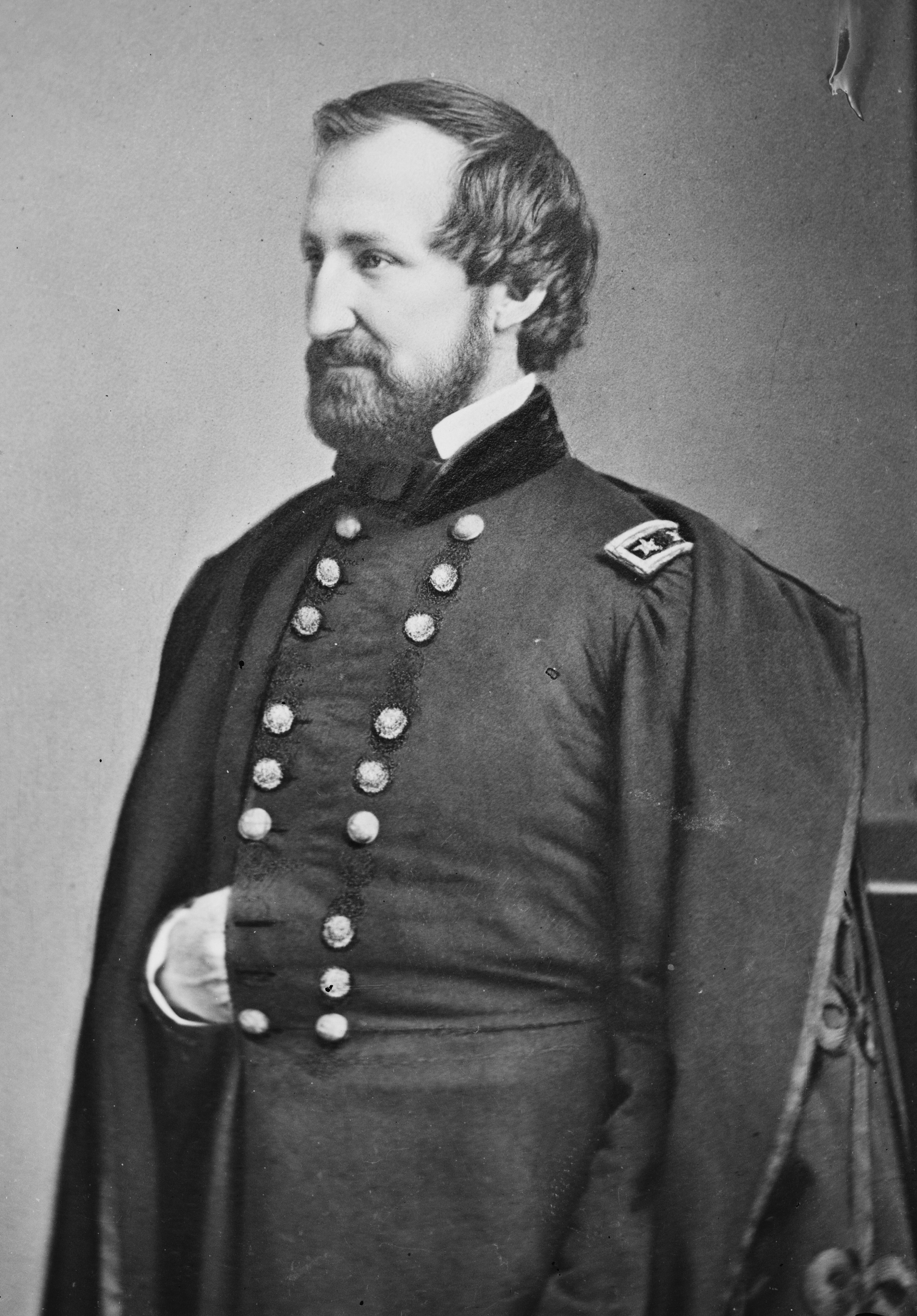
Maj. Gen.
William S. Rosecrans, (Commanding) USA

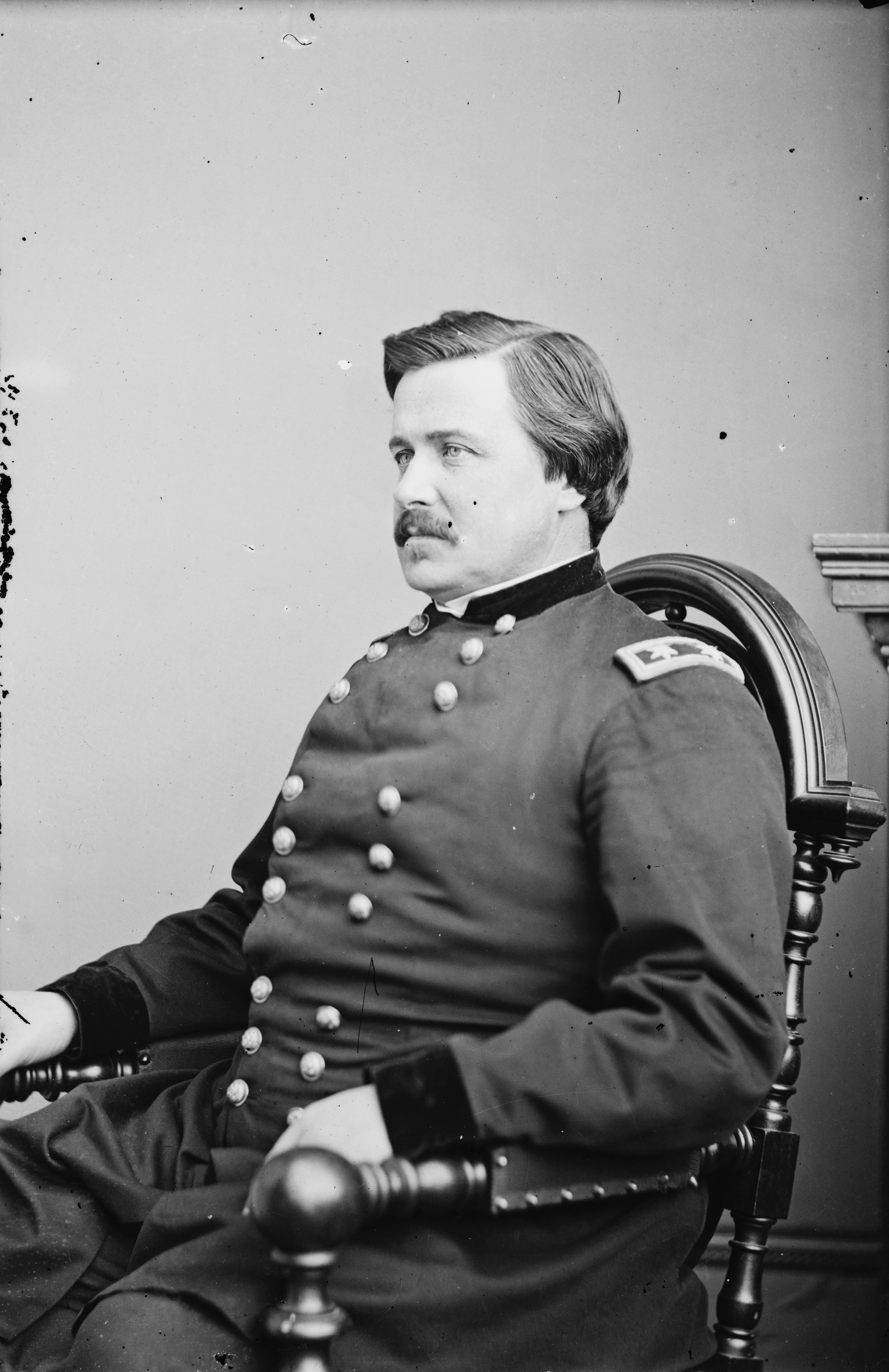
Maj. Gen.
Alexander M. McCook, USA

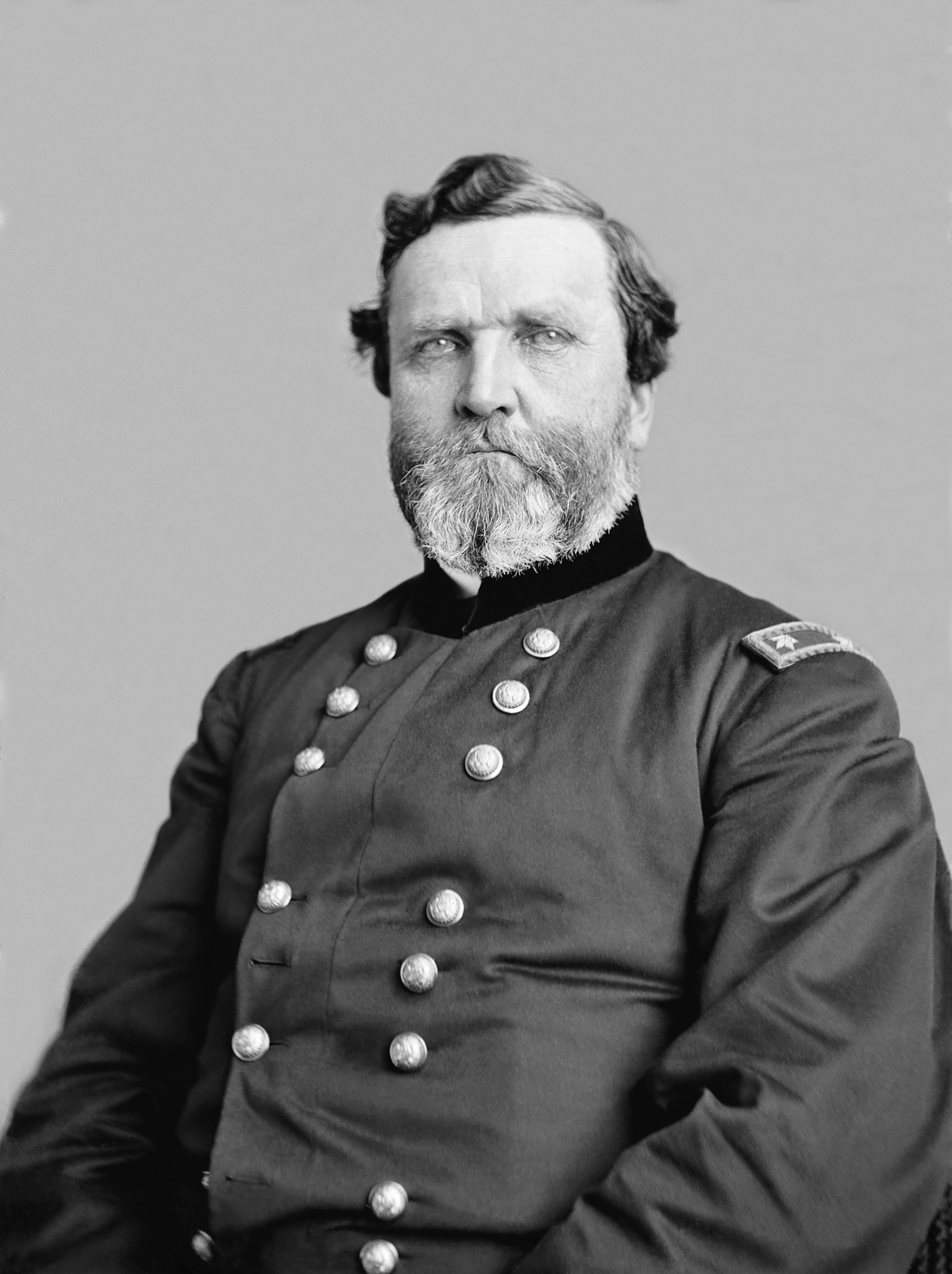
Maj. Gen.
George H. Thomas, USA

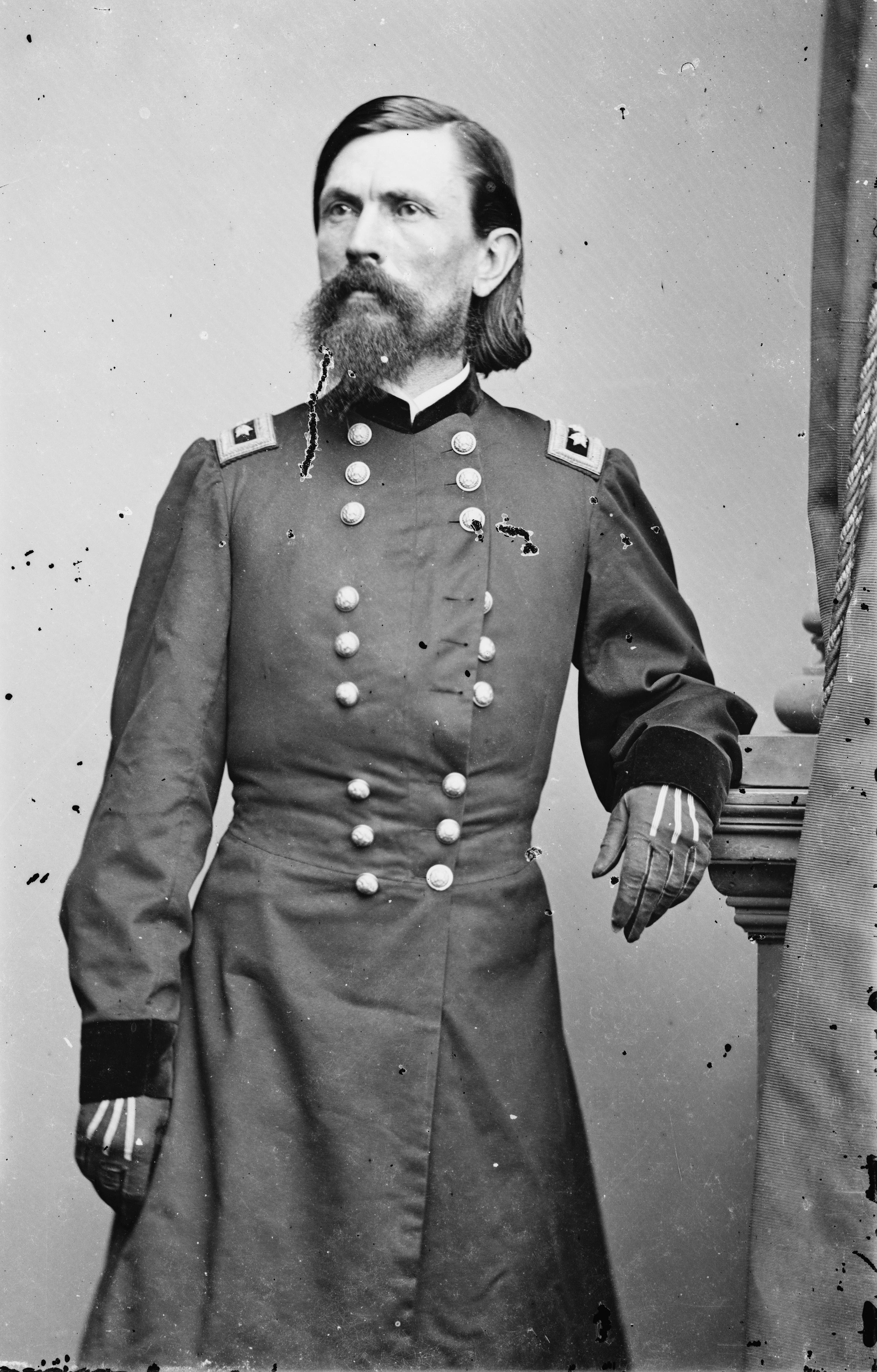
Maj. Gen.
Thomas L. Crittenden, USA

Maj. Gen. William Rosecrans' Army of the Cumberland fielded approximately 43,000 men and included three infantry army corps named Right Wing, Center and Left Wing.

The Right Wing, under Maj. Gen. Alexander McD. McCook, consisted of the following divisions:

- First Division, Brig. Gen. Jefferson C. Davis (brigades of Cols. P. Sidney Post, William P. Carlin and William E. Woodruff).
- Second Division, Brig. Gen. Richard W. Johnson (brigades of Brig. Gen. August Willich, Brig. Gen. Edward N. Kirk and Col. Philemon P. Baldwin).
- Third Division, Brig. Gen. Philip Sheridan (brigades of Brig. Gen. Joshua W. Sill, Col. Frederick Schaefer and Col. George W. Roberts).

The Center, under Maj. Gen. George H. Thomas, consisted of the following divisions:

- First Division, MG Lovell H. Rousseau (brigades of Col. Benjamin F. Scribner, Col. John Beatty, Col. John C. Starkweather and Lt. Col. Oliver L. Shepherd)
- Second Division, BG James S. Negley (brigades of Brig. Gen. James G. Spears, Col. Timothy R. Stanley and Col. John F. Miller)
- Third Division, BG Speed S. Fry (brigade of Col. Moses B. Walker)

The Left Wing, under Maj. Gen. Thomas L. Crittenden, consisted of the following divisions:

- First Division, BG Thomas J. Wood (brigades of BG Milo S. Hascall, Col George D. Wagner, and Col Charles G. Harker)
- Second Division, BG John M. Palmer (brigades of BG Charles Cruft, Col. William B. Hazen, and Col. William Grose)
- Third Division, BG Horatio P. Van Cleve (brigades of Cols. Samuel Beatty, James P. Fyffe and Samuel W. Price)

The Cavalry Corps, under BG David S. Stanley, included one cavalry division (Col. John Kennett): brigades of Cols. Robert H. G. Minty and Lewis Zahm.

=== Confederate ===
Key commanders (Army of Tennessee)
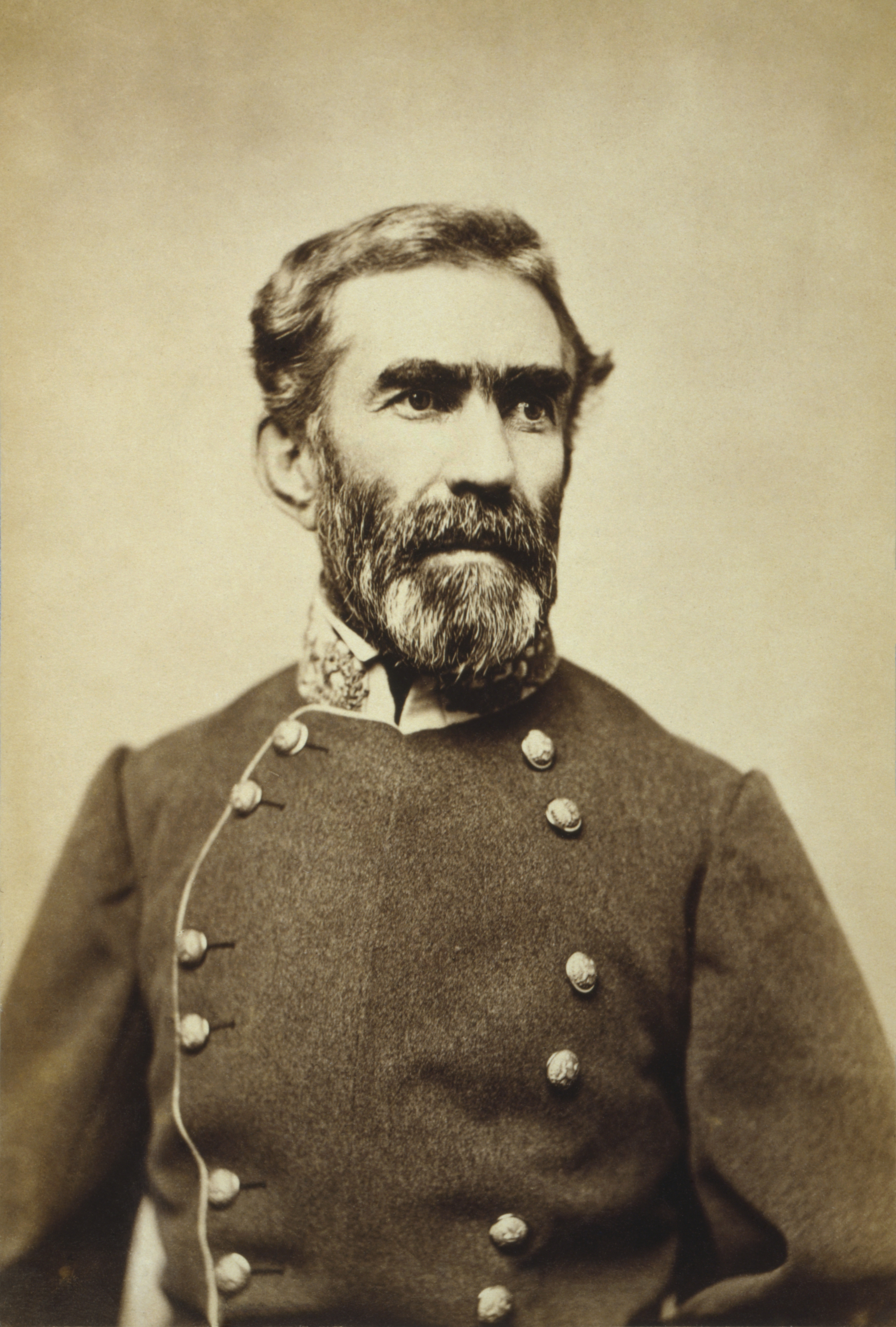
Gen.
Braxton Bragg, (Commanding) CSA

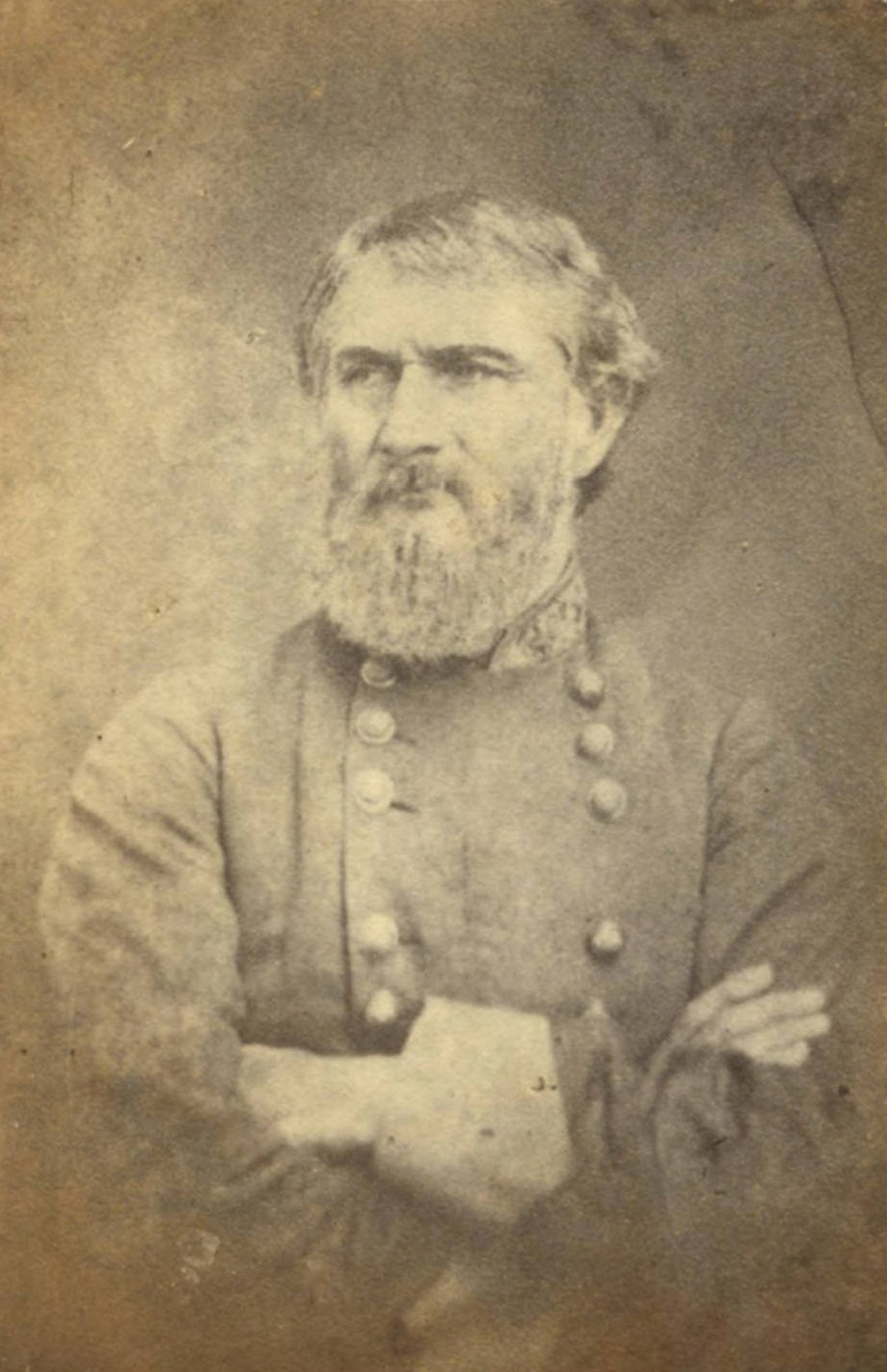
Maj. Gen.
Leonidas Polk, CSA

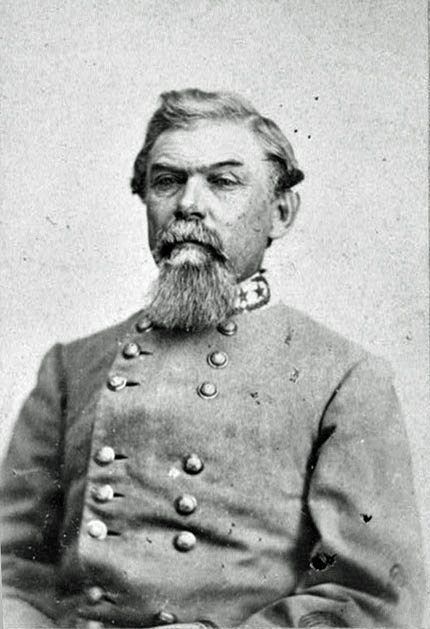
Maj. Gen.
William J. Hardee, CSA

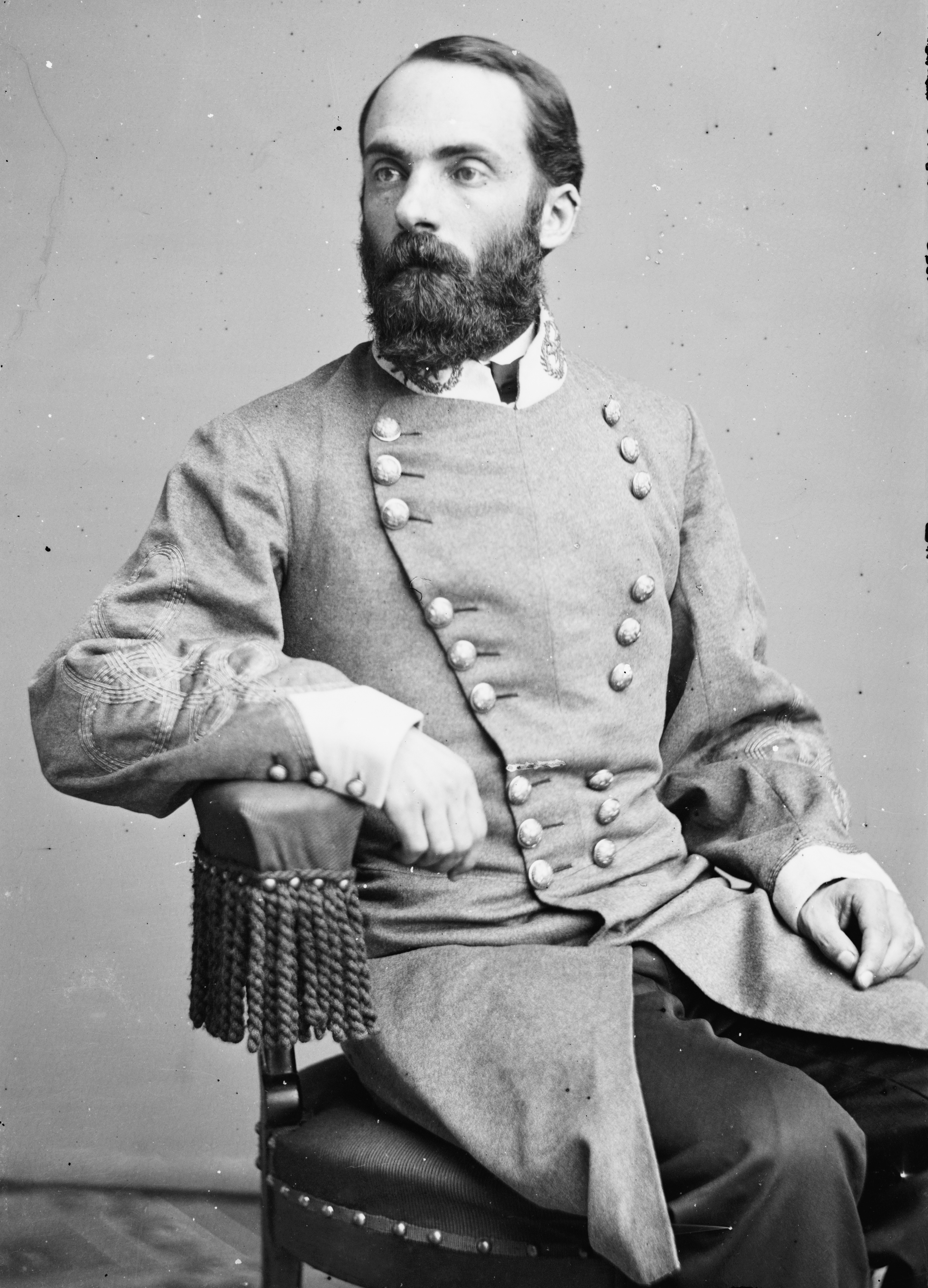
Brig. Gen.
Joseph Wheeler, CSA

Gen. Braxton Bragg's Army of Tennessee fielded approximately 35,000 men and included two infantry army corps:

The First Corps, under Lt. Gen. Leonidas Polk, consisted of the following divisions:

- Cheatham's Division, Maj. Gen. Benjamin F. Cheatham (brigades of Brig. Gen. Daniel S. Donelson, Brig. Gen. Alexander P. Stewart, Brig. Gen. George Maney and Col. Alfred J. Vaughan, Jr.)
- Withers' Division, Maj. Gen. Jones M. Withers (brigades of Col. John Q. Loomis, Brig. Gen. James R. Chalmers, Brig. Gen. J. Patton Anderson and Col. Arthur M. Manigault)

The Second Corps, under Lt. Gen. William J. Hardee, consisted of the following divisions:

- Breckinridge's Division, Maj. Gen. John C. Breckinridge (brigades of Brig. Gen. Daniel W. Adams, Col. Joseph B. Palmer, Brig. Gen. William Preston, Brig. Gen. Roger W. Hanson and Brig. Gen. John K. Jackson)
- Cleburne's Division, Maj. Gen. Patrick R. Cleburne (brigades of Brig. Gens. Lucius E. Polk, St. John R. Liddell, Bushrod R. Johnson and Sterling A. M. Wood)
- McCown's Division, Maj. Gen. John P. McCown (brigades of Brig. Gens. Mathew D. Ector, James E. Rains, Evander McNair and Sterling A. M. Wood)

The Cavalry Corps, under Brig. Gen. Joseph Wheeler Wheeler, consisted of brigades of Brig. Gens. Abraham Buford, John Pegram and John A. Wharton.

== Battle ==
=== December 31, 1862 ===
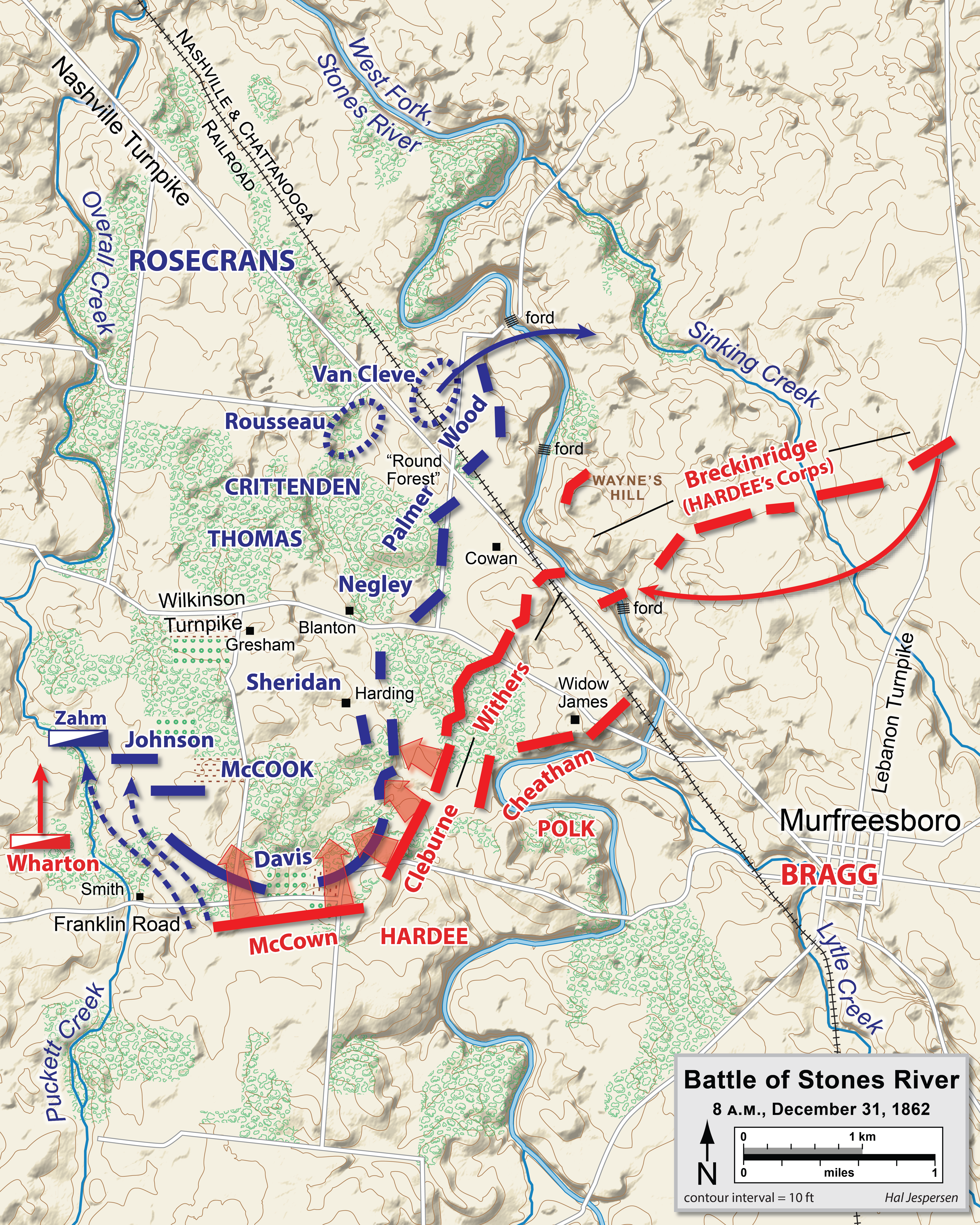
December 31, 8:00 a.m.

At dawn on December 31, about 6:00 a.m., Confederate William J. Hardee struck first, attacking the Union's right flank with the division of Maj. Gen. John P. McCown, before many in Union Brig. Gen. Richard W. Johnson's division had finished their breakfast. This was the third major battle, after Fort Donelson and Shiloh, in which an early morning attack caught a Union army by surprise. The 10,000 Confederates who massed on their left attacked in one massive wave. McCook's deceptive campfires and the relative inexperience of McCown caused his division to drift away to the left, which left a gap in the front, but the gap was filled seamlessly by the division coming up from his rear, under Maj. Gen. Patrick R. Cleburne. These two divisions swept all resistance aside. Several artillery batteries were captured without having had time to fire a shot. Johnson's division, on the right, suffered over 50% casualties. His neighboring Union division to the left, under Brig. Gen. Jefferson C. Davis, was able to hold only briefly.

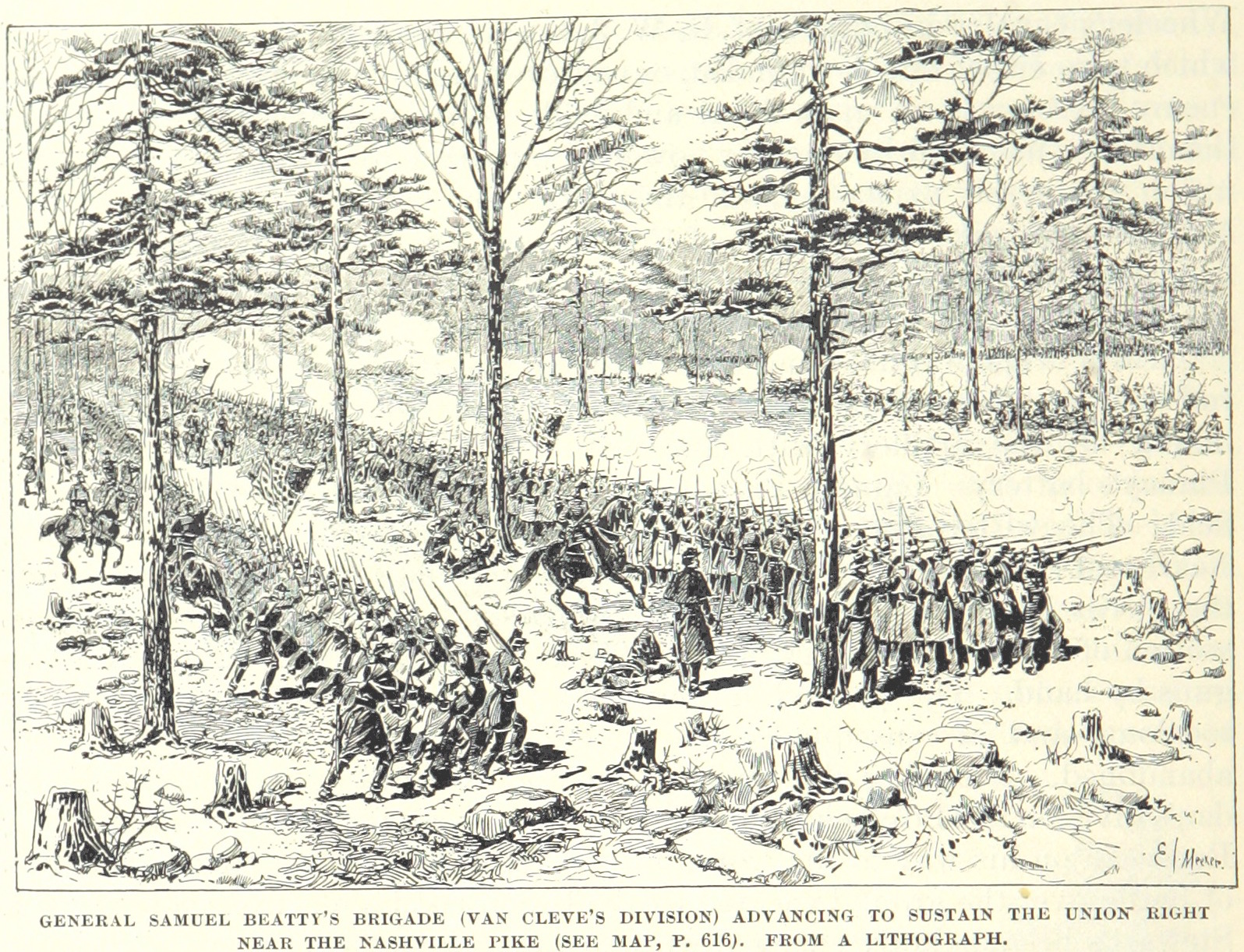
Troops of Beatty's brigade, Van Cleve's division march to reinforce the Union right

Although meeting stiff resistance, Hardee drove the Union troops back three miles (5 km) to the railroad and the Nashville Pike by 10:00 a.m., where Johnson was able to rally them. Rosecrans canceled Crittenden's attack on the Confederate right, which had begun with Brig. Gen. Horatio P. Van Cleve's division crossing the river at 7:00 a.m., and instead rushed reinforcements to his own right flank. He had been slow to recognize the threat, assuming incorrectly that McCook would be capable of turning back Hardee's assault. As Rosecrans raced across the battlefield directing units, seeming to be ubiquitous to his men, his uniform was covered with blood from his friend and chief of staff, Col. Julius Garesché, beheaded by a cannonball while riding alongside.

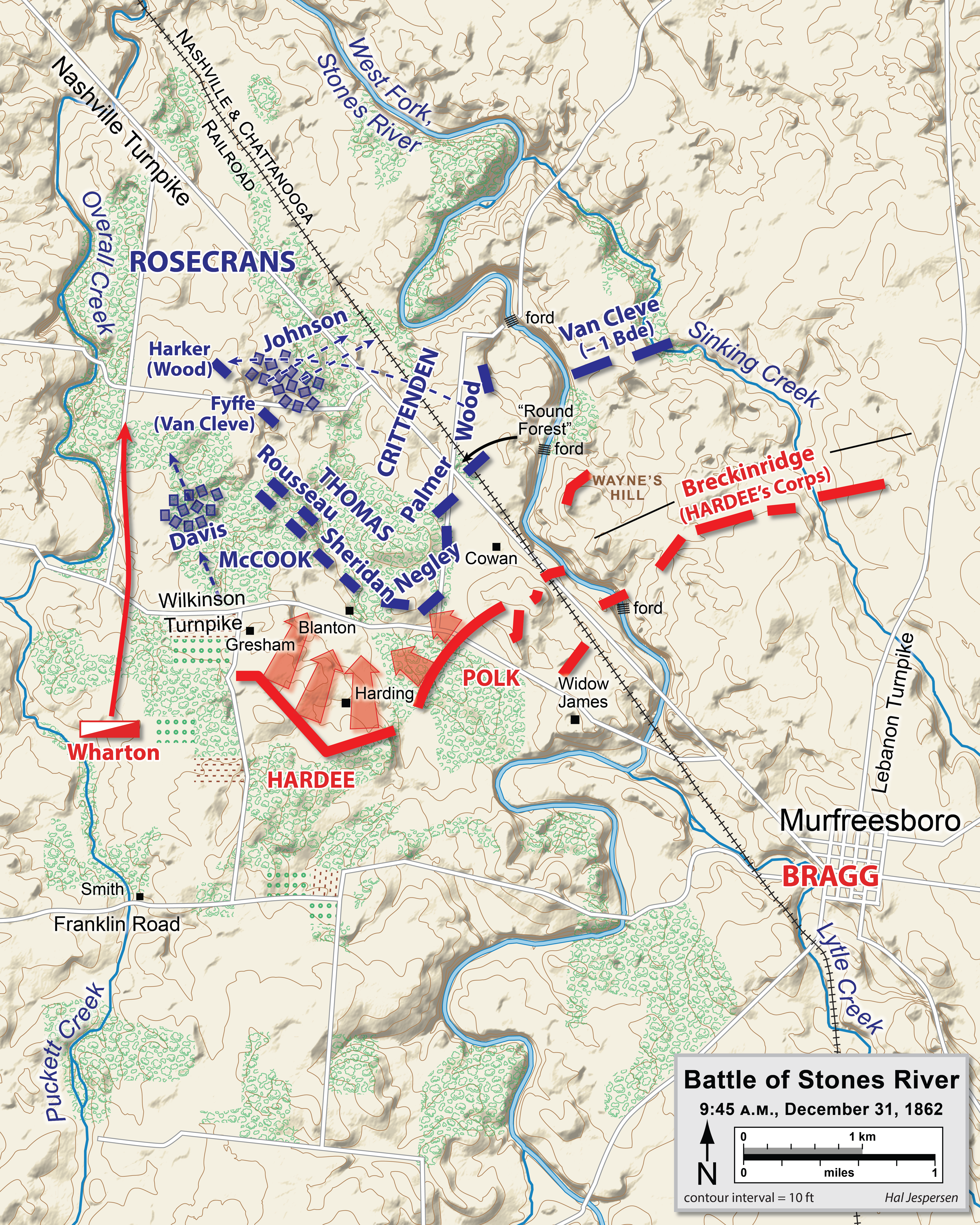
December 31, 9:45 a.m.

The second Confederate wave was composed of Polk's corps, consisting of the divisions of Maj. Gens. Jones M. Withers and Benjamin F. Cheatham. What saved the Union from total destruction that morning was the foresight of Brig. Gen. Philip Sheridan (McCook's wing), who anticipated an early attack and had the troops of his division up and ready in the center of the right half of the line by 4:00 a.m. Withers hit Sheridan's right flank first (and Davis's left) but was repulsed in three separate charges. Then Cheatham, with his reserve division, hit Sheridan's front as Cleburne struck his flank. Cheatham's assault was sluggish and piecemeal; observers claimed he had been drinking heavily and was unable to command his units effectively. While Sheridan's men slowed the enemy advance, they did it at heavy cost to themselves; all three of Sheridan's brigade commanders were killed that day, and more than one third of his men were casualties in four hours of fighting in a cedar forest surrounded on three sides that became known as "The Slaughter Pen". By 10:00 a.m., many of the Confederate objectives had been achieved. They had captured 28 guns and over 3,000 Union soldiers.

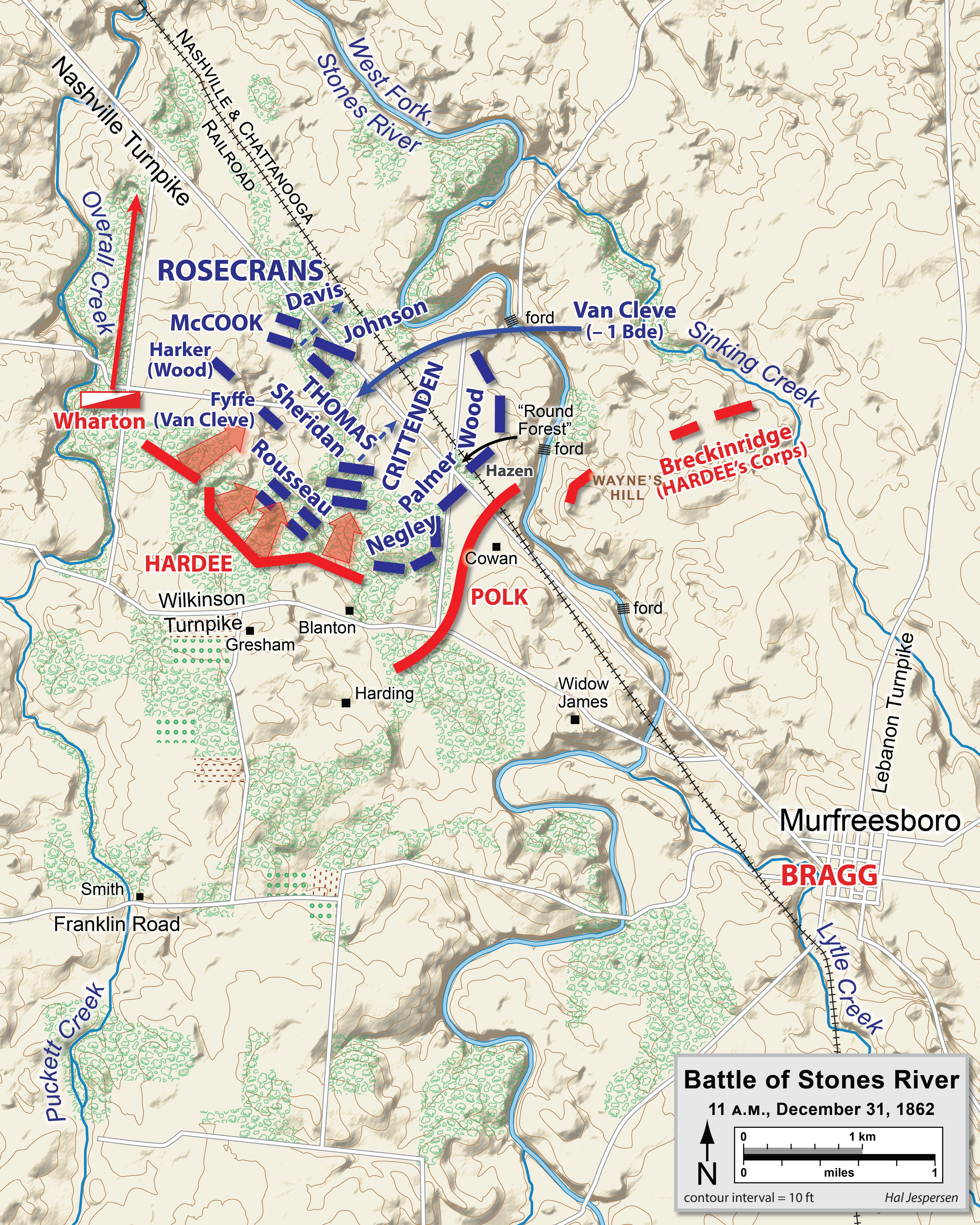
December 31, 11:00 a.m.

Two Confederate blunders aided Rosecrans. Breckinridge, on the east side of the river, did not realize that Crittenden's early morning attack had been withdrawn. He refused to send two brigades as reinforcements across the river to aid the main attack on the left. When Bragg ordered him to attack to his front—so that some use could be made of his corps—Breckinridge moved forward and was embarrassed to find out that there were no Union troops opposing him. At about that time, Bragg received a false report that a strong Union force was moving south along the Lebanon Turnpike in his direction. He canceled his orders that Breckinridge send reinforcements across the river, which diluted the effectiveness of the main attack.

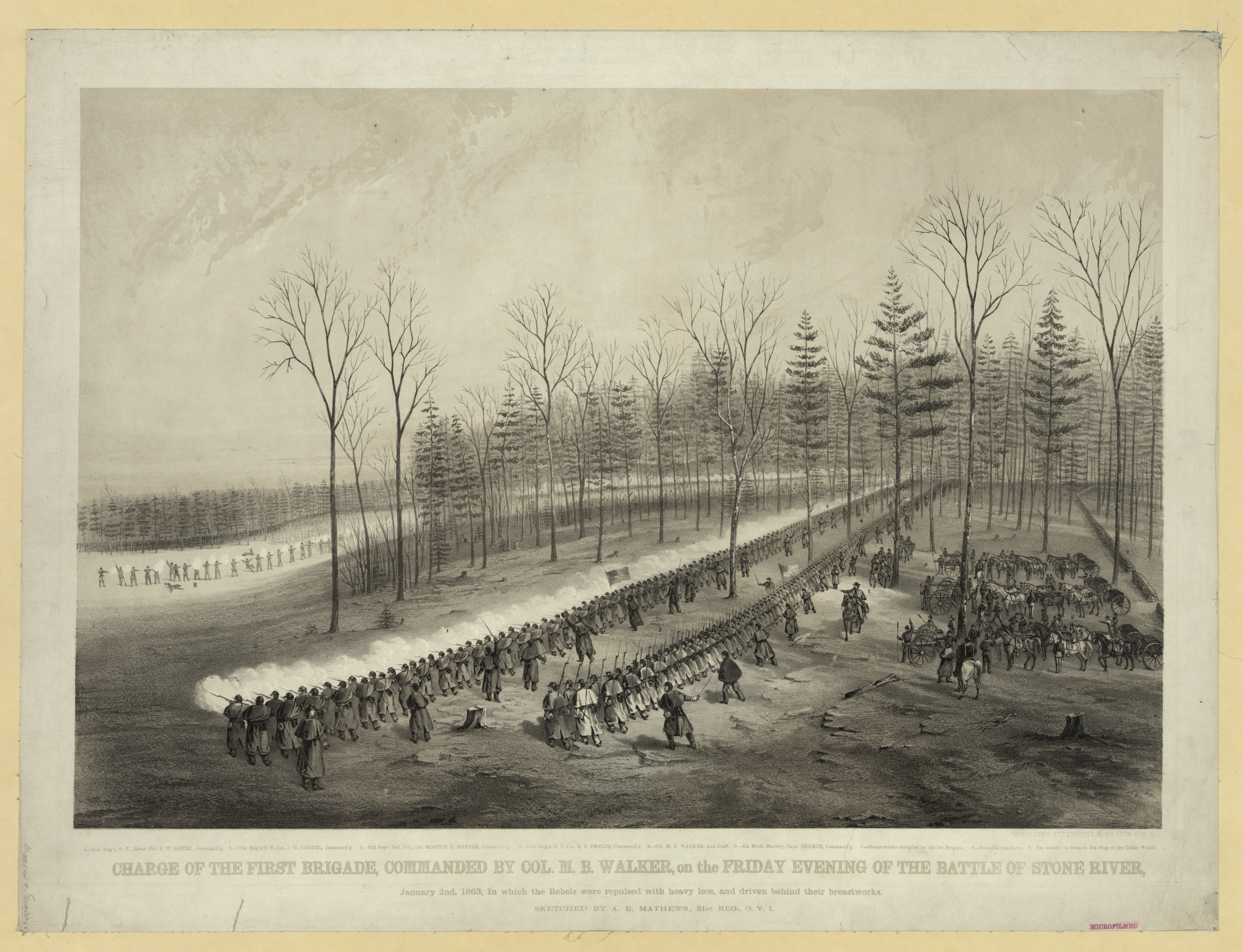
Attack of the first brigade, commanded by Col. M.B. Walker on Friday evening, driving the rebels back to their earthworks

By 11:00 a.m., Sheridan's ammunition ran low, and his division pulled back, which opened a gap that Hardee exploited. The Union troops regrouped and held the Nashville Pike, supported by reinforcements and massed artillery. Repeated attacks on the left flank of the Union line were repulsed by Col. William B. Hazen's brigade in a rocky, 4-acre (16,000 m^{2}) wooded area named "Round Forest" by the locals; it became known as "Hell's Half-Acre". Brig. Gen. Milo S. Hascall sent the 3rd Kentucky to the Round Forest as reinforcements. When he was informed that the 3rd's regimental commander was dead, he decided to take personal command of the defensive position. He declared that it had to be held, "even if it cost the last man we had". Hazen's brigade was the only part of the original Union line to hold. The Union line was stabilized by the strong leadership of Rosecrans and by the rallying of the divisions under Johnson and Davis. The new line was roughly perpendicular to the original line, in a small half oval with its back to the river.

Bragg planned to attack the Union left, a portion of the oval line facing southeast, manned by Hazen's brigade. The only troops available for such an assault were Breckinridge's, and Bragg ordered him to cross the river, but Breckinridge moved slowly. By 4:00 p.m., Breckinridge's first two brigades assaulted Hazen in piecemeal attacks and suffered heavy repulses. Two more brigades arrived, and they were sent in, reinforced by other elements of Polk's corps. The attack failed a second time. Thomas responded with a limited counterattack that cleared his front. By 4:30 p.m., the battle was finished.

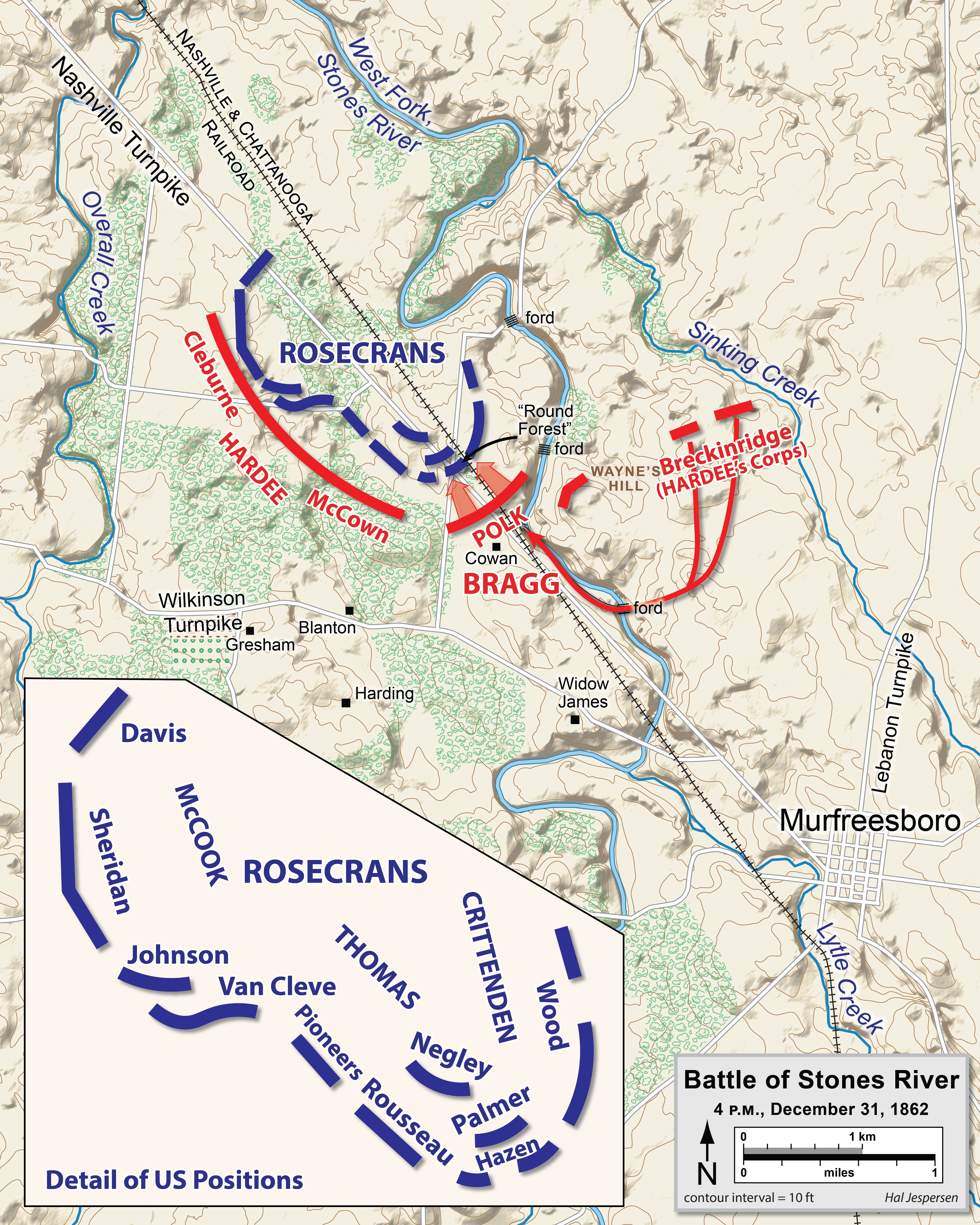
December 31, 4:00 p.m.

Bragg's plan had had a fundamental flaw: although his objective was to cut Rosecrans's line of communication (the Nashville Pike), his attack drove the Union defenders to concentrate at that point. Bragg's biographer, Grady McWhiney, observed:

Unless the Union army collapsed at the first onslaught, it would be pushed back into a tighter and stronger defensive position as the battle continued, while the Confederate forces would gradually lose momentum, become disorganized, and grow weaker. Like a snowball, the Union would pick up strength from the debris of battle if they retreated in good order. But the Confederates would inevitably unwind like a ball of string as they advanced.

That night Rosecrans held a council of war to decide what to do. Some of his generals felt that the Union army had been defeated and recommended a retreat before they were entirely cut off. Rosecrans opposed this view and was strongly supported by Thomas and Crittenden. Thomas has been quoted by different sources in the council meeting as saying either "This army does not retreat" or "There's no better place to die." The decision was made to stand and fight, and as the Union line was reinforced, the morale of the soldiers rose.

On the Confederate side, Bragg was certain that he had won a victory. Although he had suffered 9,000 casualties, he was convinced that the large number of captured Union soldiers meant that Rosecrans had lost considerably more. The Confederate army began digging in, facing the Union line. Bragg sent a telegram to Richmond before he went to bed: "The enemy has yielded his strong position and is falling back. We occupy [the] whole field and shall follow him. ... God has granted us a happy New Year."

=== January 1–3, 1863 ===
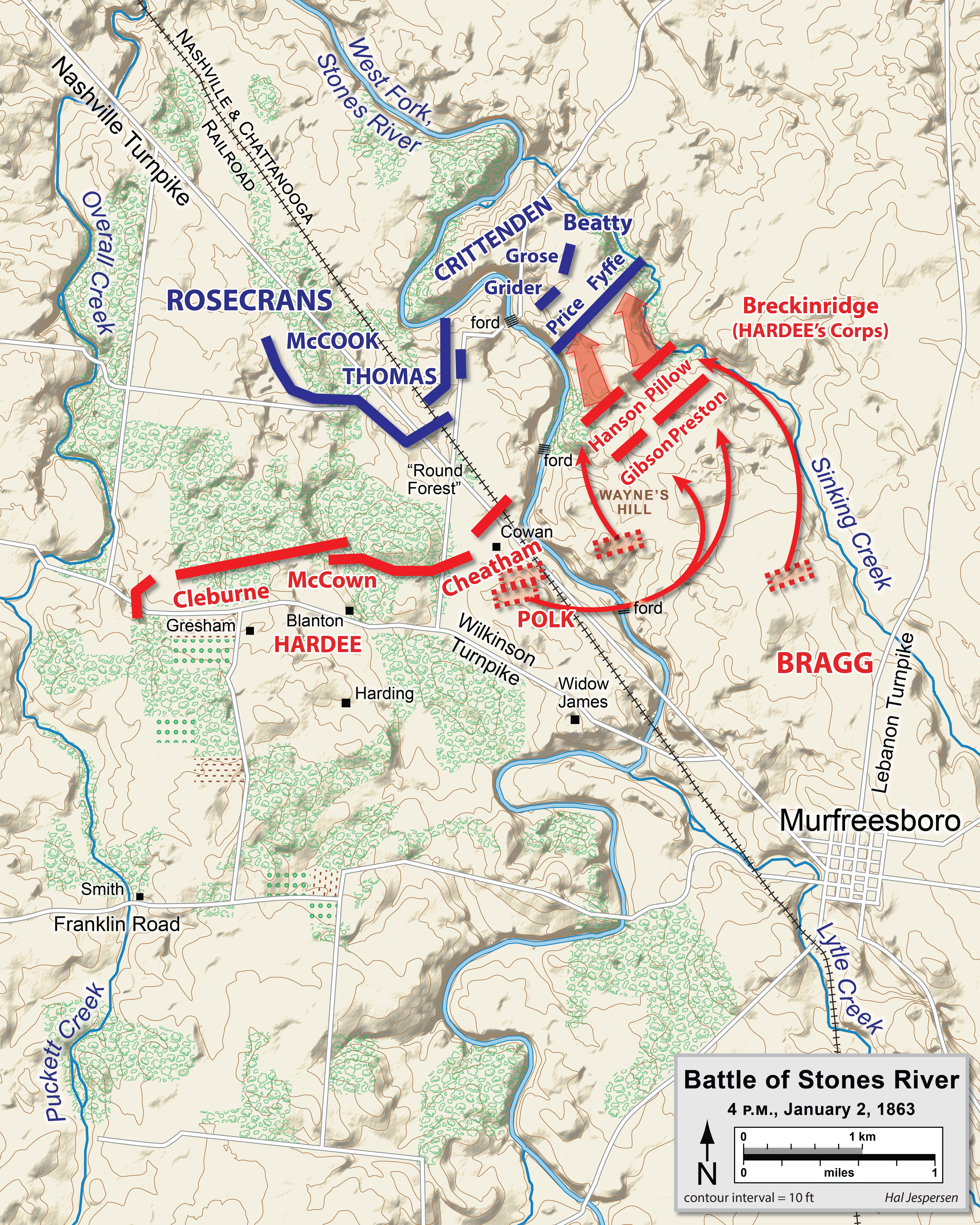
January 2, 4:00 p.m.

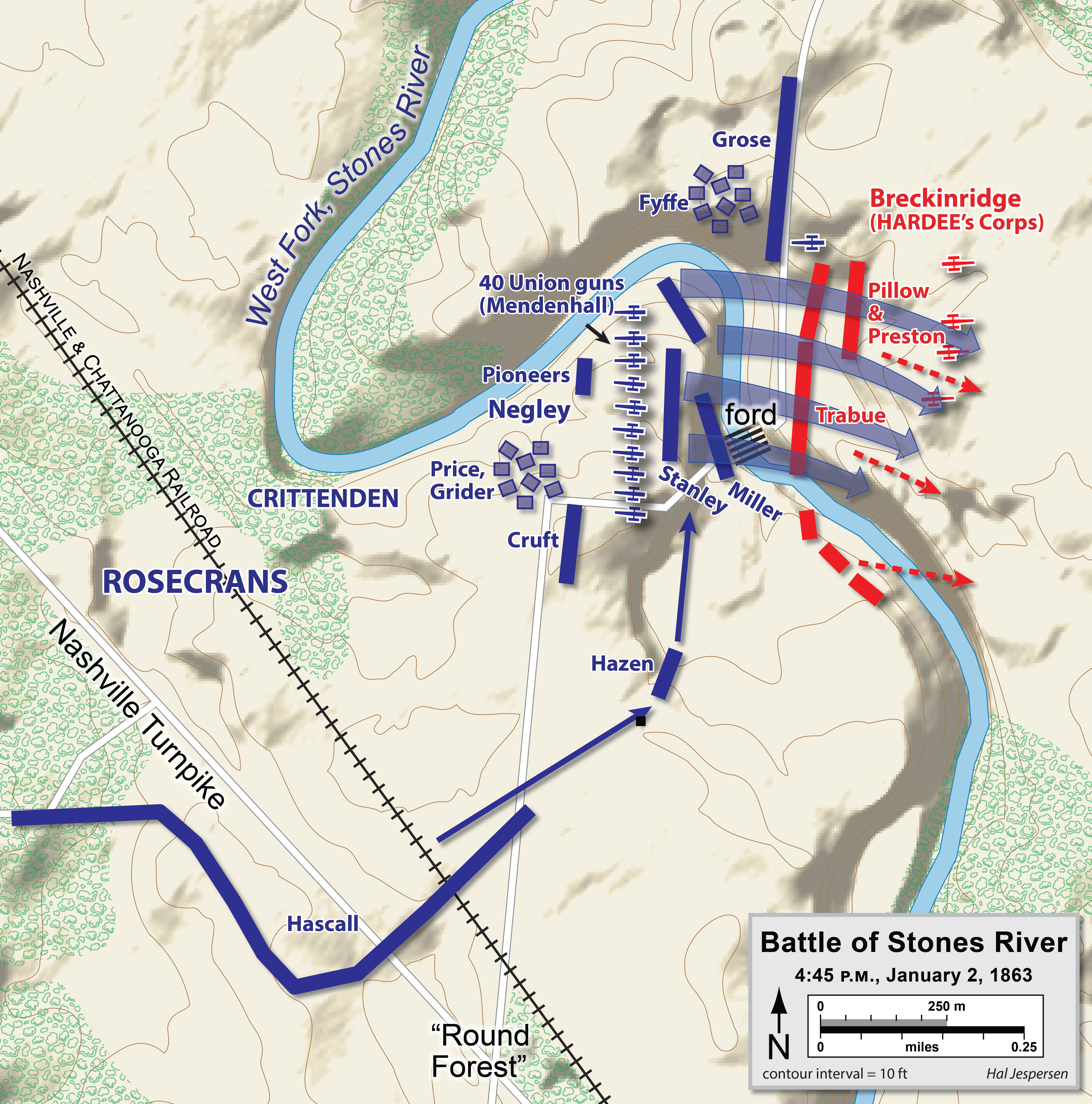
January 2, 4:45 p.m.

At 3:00 a.m. on January 1, 1863, Rosecrans revived his original plan and ordered Van Cleve's division (commanded by Col. Samuel Beatty following Van Cleve's wounding the previous day) to cross the river and occupy the heights there, protecting two river crossing sites and providing a good platform for artillery. But the day was relatively quiet as both armies observed New Year's Day by resting and tending to their wounded. Polk launched two probes of the Union line, one against Thomas, the other against Sheridan, to little effect.

In the rear, Wheeler's cavalry continued to harass the Union line of communication on the turnpike back to Nashville. Convoys of wounded had to travel under heavy escort to be protected from the cavalry, and Wheeler interpreted these movements as preparations for a retreat, and he reported such to Bragg. Buoyed by his sense that he had won the battle, Bragg was content to wait for Rosecrans to retreat.

At 4:00 p.m. on January 2, Bragg directed Breckinridge's troops to attack Beatty's division, which was occupying the hill on the east side of the river. Breckinridge initially protested that the assault would be suicidal but eventually agreed and attacked with determination. The Union troops were pushed back across McFadden Ford, but the Confederate charge ran into heavy fire from massed Union artillery across the river, commanded by Crittenden's artillery chief, Capt. John Mendenhall. Mendenhall deployed his guns perfectly—45 arrayed hub-to-hub on the ridge overlooking McFadden's Ford and 12 more guns about a mile to the southwest, which could provide enfilading fire, completely commanding the opposite bank and heights beyond—and saved the day for Rosecrans. The Confederate attack stalled, having suffered over 1,800 casualties in less than an hour. A Union division under the command of James S. Negley (Thomas's wing) led a counterattack at 4:45 p.m., and the Confederate troops retreated. Breckinridge was devastated by the disaster. He lost nearly one third of his Kentucky troops (Hanson's Brigade, also known as the Orphan Brigade because it could not return to Union-occupied Kentucky). As he rode among the survivors, he cried out repeatedly, "My poor Orphans! My poor Orphans."

On the morning of January 3, a large supply train and reinforced infantry brigade led by Brig. Gen. James G. Spears reached Rosecrans. Wheeler's cavalry attempted to capture the ammunition train that followed it but was repulsed. Late that evening, Thomas attacked the center of the Confederate line with two regiments in reaction to constant enemy sharpshooting against troops in his division under Lovell H. Rousseau. Thomas drove the Confederates from their entrenchments, taking about 30 prisoners. Despite this action, the main battle is generally accepted to have ended on January 2.

Bragg now knew that Rosecrans was not likely to retreat and would continue to receive reinforcements—the Confederates had only about 20,000 men ready to resume a battle and intelligence reports convinced Bragg that Rosecrans would soon have 70,000—and he knew that the miserable weather of freezing rain could raise the river enough to split his army. Beginning at 10:00 p.m. on January 3, he withdrew through Murfreesboro and began a retreat to Tullahoma, Tennessee, 36 miles (58 km) to the south. Rosecrans occupied Murfreesboro on January 5, but made no attempt to pursue Bragg. Rosecrans was quoted after the battle as saying, "Bragg's a good dog, but Hold Fast's a better."

Just as at Perryville, Bragg seemed to change under stress from a bold and aggressive attacker to a hesitant and cautious retreater. He had, of course, sound reasons for withdrawing from Murfreesboro. His principal subordinates advised him to retreat. He had lost nearly 30% of his men in the recent battles; if forced to fight again without some rest, his army might disintegrate. But his decision to retreat allowed his enemies to charge that once again Bragg had lost his nerve.

— Bragg's biographer, Grady McWhiney

== Aftermath ==
=== Casualties ===
Total casualties in the battle were 25,645: 13,906 on the Union side and 11,739 for the Confederates, or 32.7% of all troops. Considering that only about 78,400 men were engaged, this was the highest percentage of casualties (3.8% killed, 19.8% wounded, and 7.9% missing/captured) of any major battle in the Civil War and higher in absolute numbers than any earlier battle in U.S. history, including the infamous bloodbaths at Shiloh and Antietam earlier that year. Four brigadier generals were killed or mortally wounded: Confederate James E. Rains and Roger W. Hanson; Union Edward N. Kirk and Joshua W. Sill.

=== Effect on the Confederacy ===
While the battle was tactically inconclusive, Bragg had been forced to withdraw and abandon central Tennessee to Union forces in the process. The Union victory earned Bragg almost universal scorn from his Confederate military colleagues; only the support of Joseph E. Johnston and President Jefferson Davis's inability to find a suitable replacement saved his command.

=== Effect on the Union ===
The battle was very important to Union morale, as evidenced by Abraham Lincoln's letter to General Rosecrans: "You gave us a hard-earned victory, which had there been a defeat instead, the nation could scarcely have lived over." The Confederate threat to Kentucky and Middle Tennessee had been nullified, and Nashville was secure as a major Union supply base for the rest of the war.

Rosecrans spent five and a half months reinforcing Murfreesboro. The massive earthenworks "Fort Rosecrans" was built there and served as a supply depot for the remainder of the war. The next major operation, the Tullahoma Campaign, did not come until June, when Rosecrans finally moved his army against Bragg.

== Battlefield preservation ==
Stones River National Battlefield
- IUCN category III (natural monument or feature)
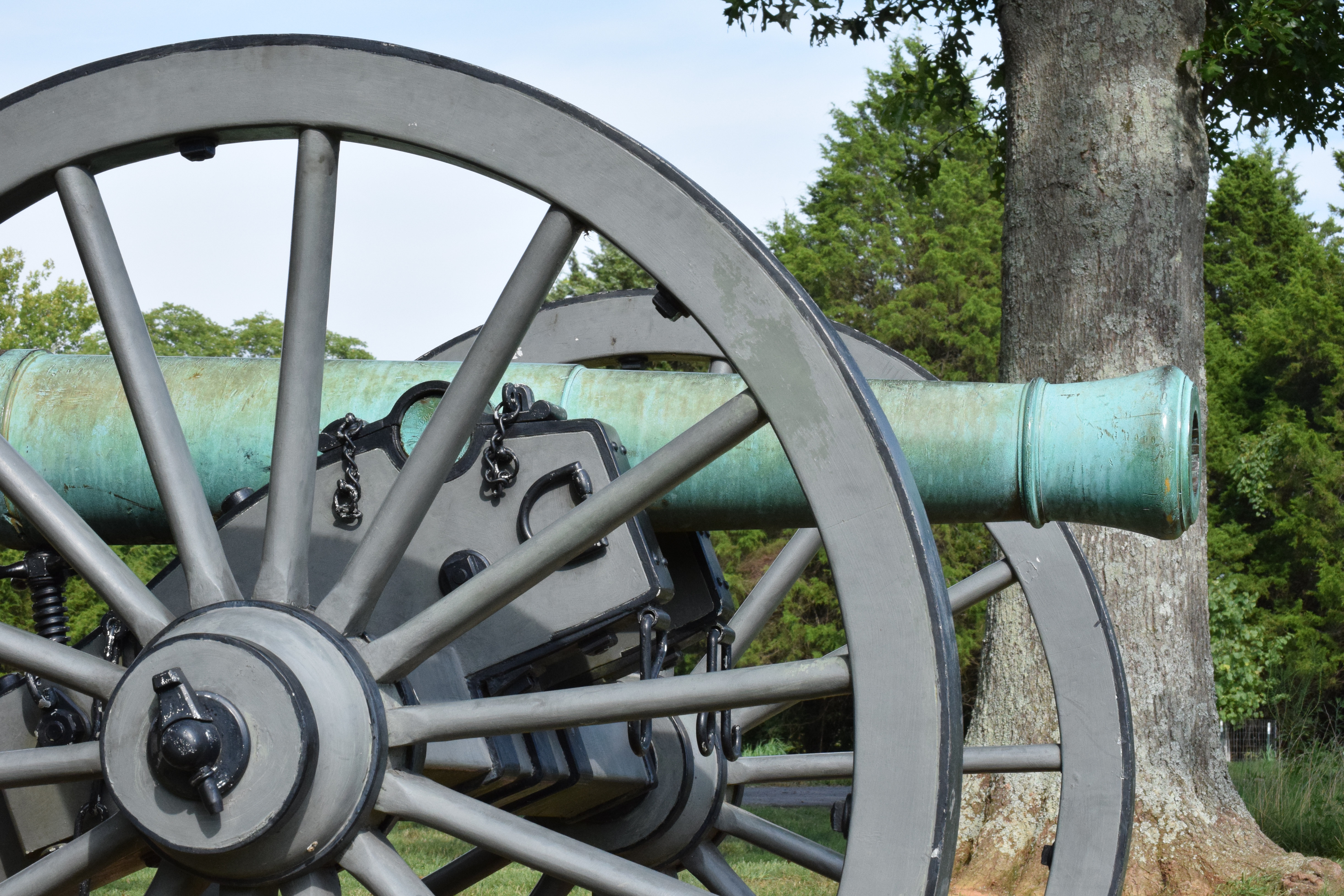
- Cannon in the late afternoon sun
- Interactive map of Stones River National Battlefield
- Location: Rutherford County, Tennessee, USA
- Area: 728.41 acres (294.78 ha)
- Established: March 3, 1927
- Visitors: 206,425 (in 2005)
- Governing body: National Park Service

Part of the site of the Battle of Stones River and Fort Rosecrans is now Stones River National Battlefield. It contains the Hazen Brigade Monument, the nation's oldest intact Civil War monument, erected in May 1863 by William Hazen's brigade at Hell's Half Acre. The 600 acre (2.4 km^{2}) National Battlefield includes Stones River National Cemetery, established in 1865, with more than 6,000 Union graves. The American Battlefield Trust and its partners have acquired and preserved 74 acres (0.30 km^{2}) of the battlefield, some of which has been sold to the National Park Service and incorporated into the national battlefield.

== Appearances in music ==
The battle is referenced in the song "Dear Sister" by bluegrass musician Claire Lynch.

The Steeldrivers also recount the battle in the song "The River Runs Red".

== See also ==
- First Battle of Murfreesboro
- Confederate Heartland Offensive or Kentucky Campaign.
- Battle of Perryville
- Troop engagements of the American Civil War, 1862
- List of costliest American Civil War land battles
- Armies in the American Civil War
