= Stony Mountain (Missouri) =

Summit in the American state of Missouri

- Location within Missouri

Highest point
- Elevation: 1,184 ft (361 m)
- Coordinates: 37°21′39″N 90°38′01″W

Geography
- Location: Iron County, Missouri, U.S.
- Parent range: Saint Francois Mountains
- Topo map(s): USGS Des Arc and Brunot

Stony Mountain is a summit in Iron County in the U.S. state of Missouri. Stony Mountain lies about 3.5 miles east of Annapolis and about four miles northeast of Vulcan on Missouri Route 49.

Stony Mountain was so named on account of its granite outcroppings.
