= Cymon and Iphigenia (Leighton painting) =

Painting by Frederic Leighton

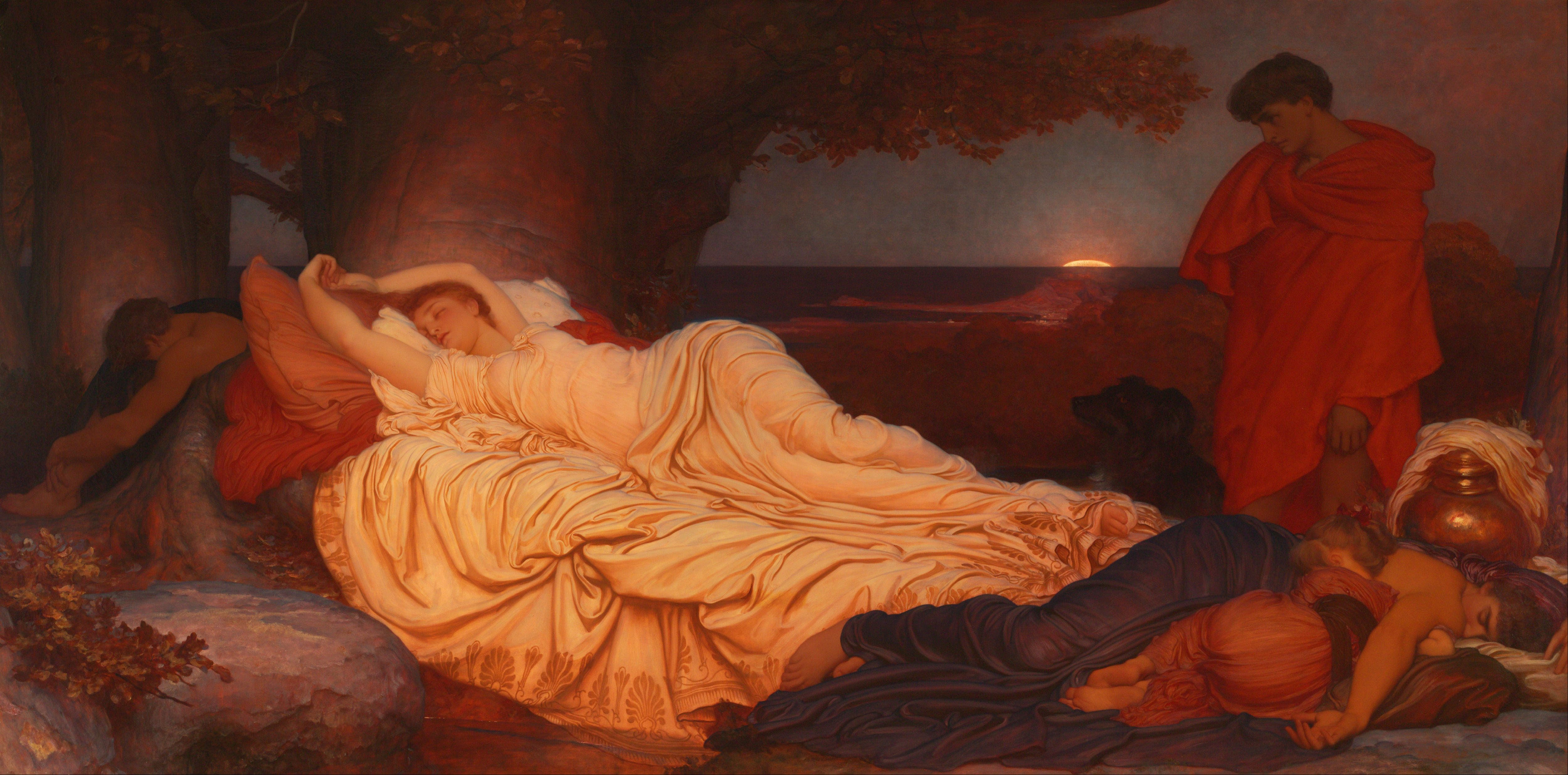
- Artist: Frederic Leighton
- Year: 1884
- Medium: oil on canvas
- Dimensions: 163 cm × 328 cm (64 in × 129 in)
- Location: Art Gallery of New South Wales, Sydney, Australia

Cymon and Iphigenia is an oil on canvas painting by Frederic Leighton, 1st Baron Leighton. The painting does not bear a date but was first exhibited at the Royal Academy of Arts, London, in 1884. The Art Gallery of New South Wales in Sydney, Australia, purchased it at a Christie's auction in London in 1976.

== Background ==
According to a story published in 1897, Leighton spent six months searching throughout Europe for a model to match his imagined ideal of Iphigenia for his intended portrayal of Cymon and Iphigenia. He saw a young actress, Dorothy Dene, in a theatre in London and his search was over. Possessing a classical Greek style beauty, Dene had golden wavy hair with excellent skin texture and colouration on her face; she was taller than average with graceful arms and legs together with an “exquisitely moulded bust”. She appeared in several other of Leighton's works, including Flaming June, Greek Girls Playing Ball and Summer Moon. Lena, one of Dene's younger sisters, appears in the painting as the child slave. Other paintings by Leighton featuring Dene are: The Bath of Psyche, Clytie, Perseus and Andromeda, Solitude, The Return of Persephone and The Vestal.

The painting took eight months to complete; a succession of line drawings were done first as Leighton tried to capture the position he wanted for the central figure, around 56 – including several of foliage and other elements of the piece – of these are known to exist. The English art critic Peter Nahum describes the painting as "central among Leighton's later works", an opinion Mrs Russell Barrington considered was shared by Leighton. Leighton's painting Idyll dating from a few years earlier has some similar elements but lacks the complexities of Cymon and Iphigenia. The two compositions each highlight the difference between the fair complexion of a female with a dark skinned male; both feature a full-length woman reclining beneath a tree and similar lighting techniques are used.

== Description ==
The overall dimensions of the undated oil on canvas painting are 163 by 328 centimetres (64 by 129 in). Based on Giovanni Boccaccio's The Decameron, the painting depicts a scene from the first tale of day five; Iphigenia is sleeping in the woods and Cymon, a young nobleman, stands gazing at her beauty which fills him with inspiration. After seeing her, Cymon changes from a badly mannered lout to an ideal polymath. Nahum felt it "emphasised the transforming power of beauty." Boccaccio set the story in the springtime; Leighton preferred the ambience of a more autumnal feel. The artist was very precise about the mood he wanted to reflect by describing the specific setting of the time of day as "the most mysteriously beautiful in the whole twenty-four hours". He wished to capture the overall impression of drowsiness just before drifting to sleep especially on long hot days as night begins to fall. The painting is set when there is the "merest lip of the moon" showing on the horizon above the sea and the atmosphere is "haunted still with the flush of the after-glow from the sun already hidden in the west."

Iphigenia lies with her face and torso pivoted slightly to her right, her arms are raised above her head. Her body is loosely covered by material and the depiction of her figure is described as "masterly" by a writer using the name of "Mentezuma" in his report included in the Art Amateur about the Royal Academy exhibition of 1884. Other sleeping figures are Iphigenia's servants and a dog. According to Greenhough White, Leighton had the ability to show "the perfection of repose" and the "self-abandonment and unconsciousness of sleep" and it was utilised to full effect in this painting and his earlier work entitled Summer Moon.

== Exhibitions and provenance ==
The first time the painting was exhibited at the Royal Academy of Arts was at the summer exhibition in 1884. After viewing it at the exhibition an unnamed French critic reported that he could not recall "a more original effect of light and colour, used in the broad, true, and ideal treatment of lovely forms." The following year, in 1885, it was exhibited in Berlin. It was again displayed at the Royal Academy in the winter of 1897, a memorial exhibition of his works as Leighton had died on 25 January 1896. It was included in the Guildhall Art Gallery's annual loan exhibition in 1897. Sir W.E. Cuthbert Quilter owned the painting until it was sold among his art collection in July 1909. It changed ownership a number of times in the UK, with owners including Leopold Albu, and Pamela Cavendish (mother of Hugh Cavendish, Baron Cavendish of Furness), before being purchased at auction by the Art Gallery of New South Wales, Australia, in February 1976. It returned to at the Royal Academy from mid-February to April 1996, in an exhibition devoted to the work of Leighton. The Art Gallery of New South Wales also purchased a colour study of the painting, measuring 23.5 by 46.5 centimetres (9.3 by 18.3 in), in 1986.
