= Florence West =

Florence West may refer to:

- Florence Duval West (1840–1881), American poet
- Florence West (actress) (1858–1912), English actress
