= Lachrymae (Frederic Leighton) =

Painting by Frederic Leighton

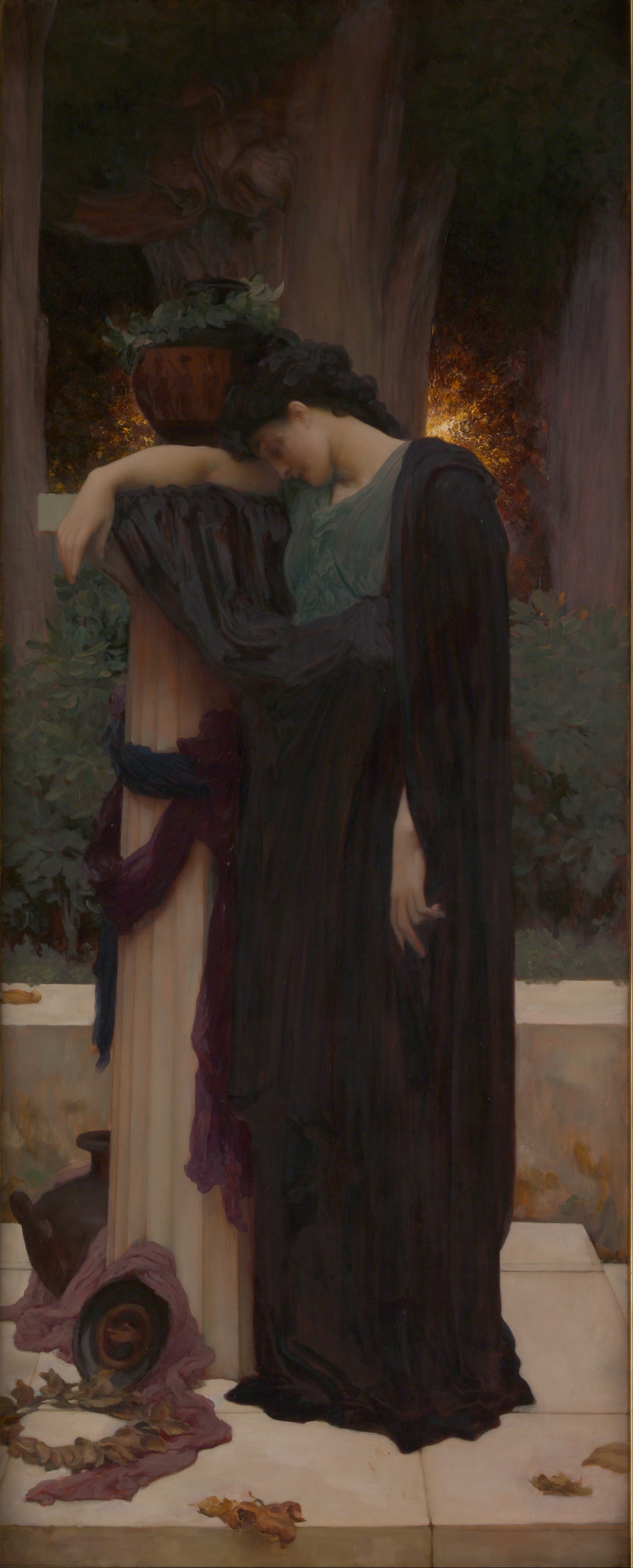
- Artist: Frederic Leighton
- Year: 1894-95
- Medium: Oil on canvas
- Dimensions: 157.5 cm × 62.9 cm (62.0 in × 24.8 in)
- Location: Metropolitan Museum of Art, New York City

Lachrymae is a late 19th-century painting by British artist Frederic Leighton. Done in oil on canvas, the work depicts a conceptual figure inspired by classical antiquity. Lachrymae is currently in the collection of the Metropolitan Museum of Art.

== Description ==
=== Background ===
Lachrymae was painted by British artist Frederic Leighton between 1894 and 1895. An influential artist, Leighton was notable for his love of history, and was known by the moniker 'Jupiter Olympus' due to his interest in classical antiquity. A member of the British upper class, Leighton was given a traditional, classics-heavy education, and was educated in several cities notable for being bastions of classical art. Following his rise as an artist in his own right, Leighton often associated himself with the Pre-Raphaelite movement, which often produced art depicting figures from Medieval and Classical lore. Leighton was considered to be a neoclassicist.

=== Painting ===
The painting itself depicts a woman leaning against a Doric column. The omnipresent theme of the work is mourning and death. The figure is dressed in black, and she leans against a pillar; some sources have postulated the pillar is a funerary monument. Cypress trees—a traditional symbol of mourning—are visible in the background, and a withered wreath made of cypress leaves can be seen at the base of the column. As noted by the Metropolitan Museum of Art's profile of Lachrymae, the painting's tabernacle frame evokes thoughts of a temple doorway. The painting's title, Lachrymae, translates to "tears" in Latin.

The painting has been compared to Electra at the Tomb of Agamemnon, one of Leighton's earlier works. A study and several preliminary drawings (both done in chalk) of the subject's head are in the collection of the Leighton House Museum in London. One source notes that the cypress rendered in Lachrymae is reminiscent of a drawing Leighton made in Florence in 1854. The model Leighton used for the painting has been identified as Mary Loyd ("Miss Loyd"), who also served as the model for Flaming June, another of Leighton's famous works.

In addition to symbols of death, Lachrymae depicts pieces of Greek pottery Leighton likely used as props or inspiration.
