= Dorothy Dene =

English stage actress and artist's model

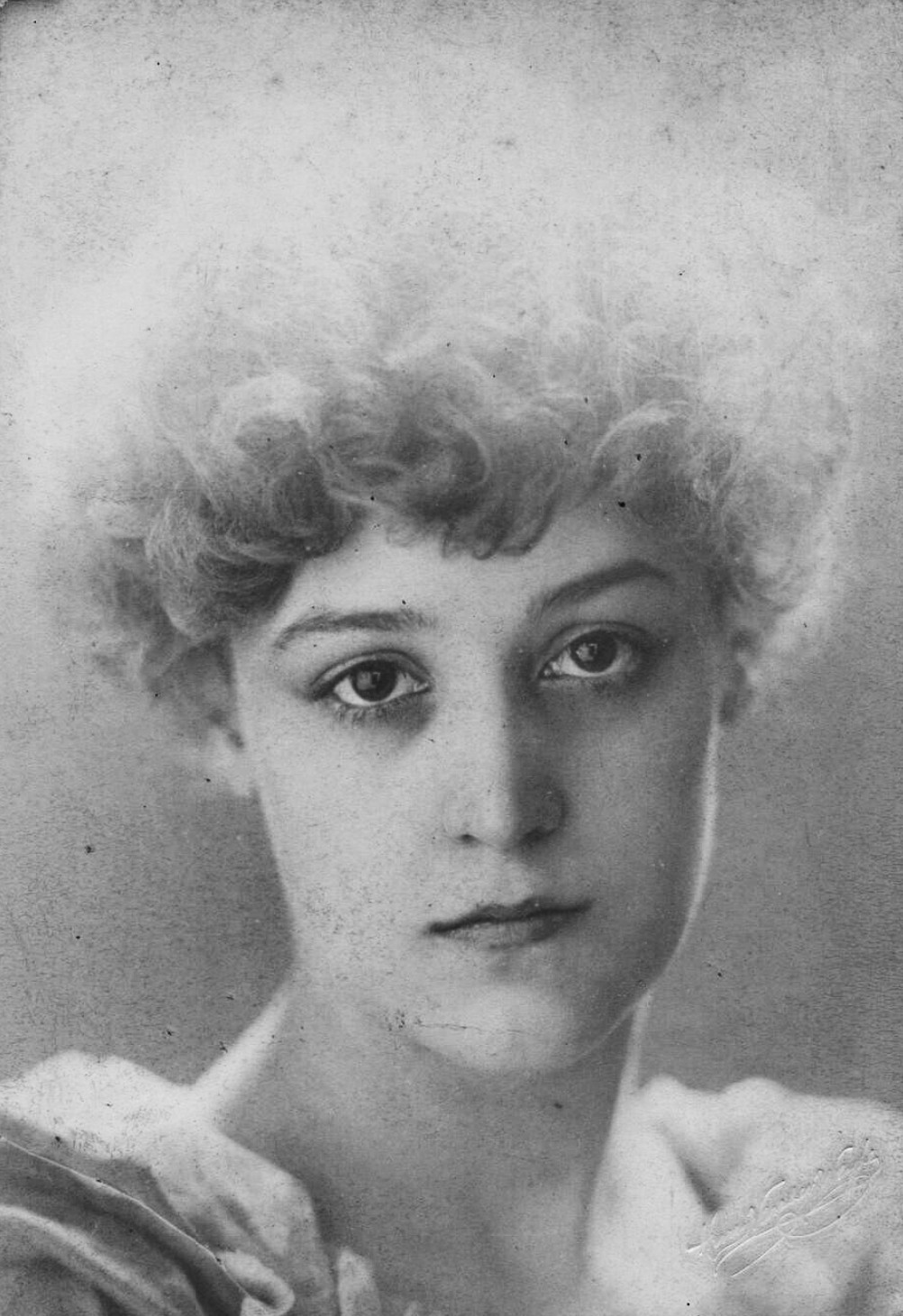
- Dene in the 1880s
- Born: Ada Alice Pullen; 1859/1860; New Cross, London, England
- Died: 27 December 1899 (aged 40); London, England
- Burial place: Kensal Green Cemetery
- Occupations: Actress; artist's model

Signature
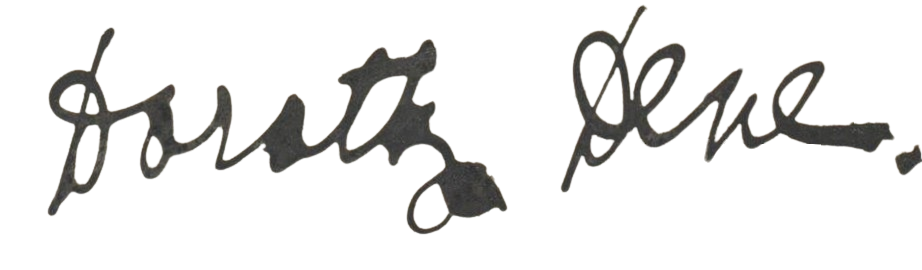

Dorothy Dene (1859/1860 – 27 December 1899), born Ada Alice Pullen, was an English stage actress and artist's model for the painter Frederick Leighton and some of his associates. Dene was considered to have a classical face and figure and a flawless complexion. Her height was above average and she had long arms, large gray-blue (sometimes reported as violet or having a violet hue) eyes and abundant golden chestnut hair.

== Biography ==
Dene was born in New Cross, London, in 1859 or 1860; her birth name was Ada Alice Pullen. She came from a family of six siblings and a number of her sisters earned their living from acting on stage. She lived with her sisters in an apartment in South Kensington, London.

== Career as a model ==
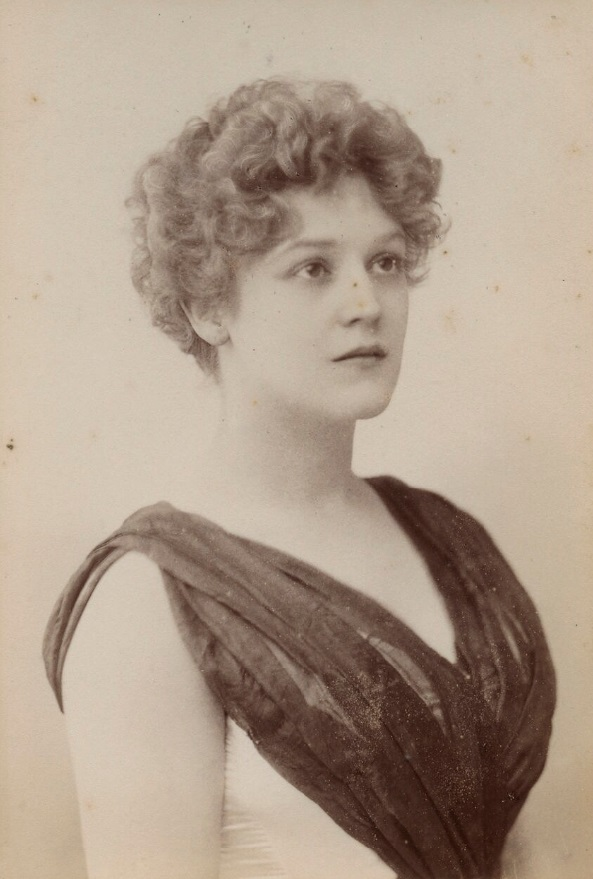
Dorothy Dene in the 1880s

According to a story published in 1897, Leighton chose her as the one woman in Europe whose face and figure most closely tallied with his ideal. Leighton searched Europe for a model suitable for his 1884 painting Cymon and Iphigenia, eventually finding Dene in a theatre in London. However, the story about her being found in a theatre is contradicted in Leighton's biography, written by Emilia Barrington right after his death. According to Barrington, Dene was spotted by the artist at the doorstep of a painter's studio close to Leighton's. The studio mentioned was probably that of Louise Starr Canziani in Kensington Green where she was already working as a model. She sat for Leighton when he painted Bianca in 1881.

Aside from Cymon and Iphigenia Dene appeared as the maiden catching the ball in Leighton's Greek Girls Playing Ball. Her long arms embellish the painter's Summer Moon. She also was the model for his Captive Andromache, The Garden of the Hesperides, The Bath of Psyche, Flaming June, among many others.

John Everett Millais and George Frederic Watts also used Dene as a model.

== Relationship with Leighton ==
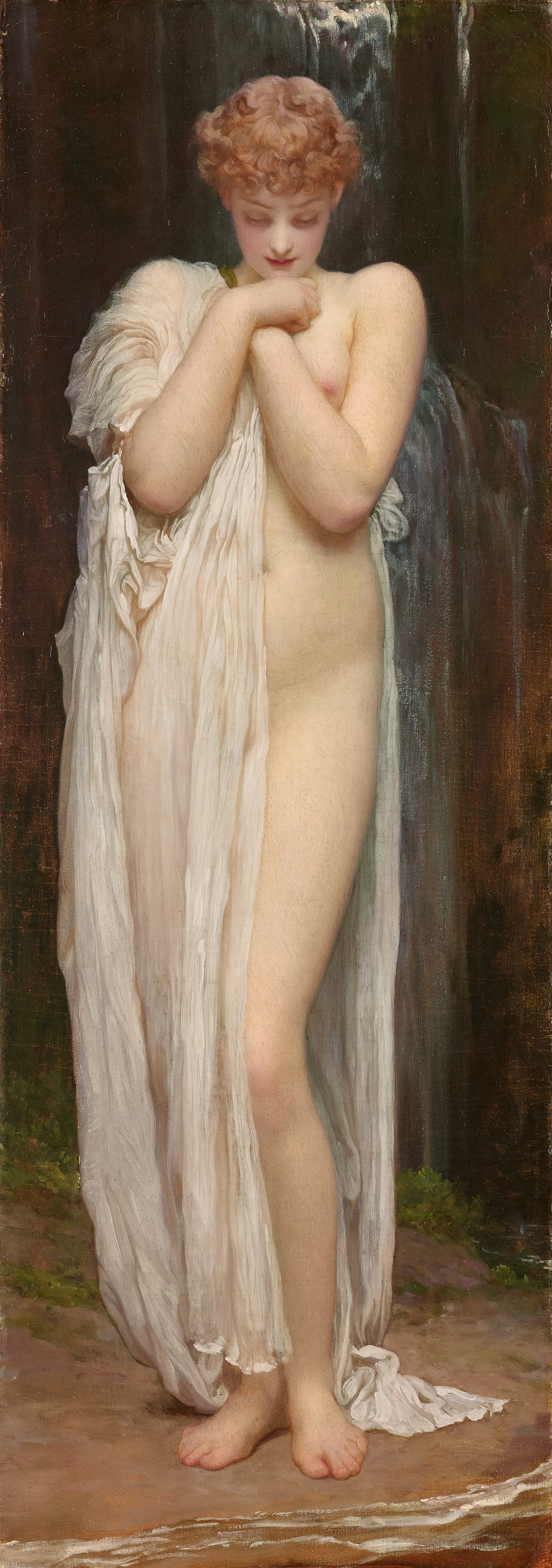
Dorothy as Crenaia, the Nymph of the Dargle, Frederic Leighton, oil on canvas, 1880. Part of the Pérez Simón collection.

There have been rumours that Leighton had a romantic interest in Dene, but nothing has ever been substantiated. Leighton's sexuality remains a matter of debate. He remained a bachelor and, according to art historian Richard Louis Ormond who together with his wife Leonée wrote Leighton's biography, acknowledged he "fulfilled some part of himself in the company of young men". However, Leighton's friend, Italian artist Giovanni Costa makes some mysterious references to the artist's "wife" in letters to their mutual friend George Howard, 9th Earl of Carlisle. It has been speculated that they refer to Dene.

Leighton assisted Dene in her acting career; educating her and introducing her to "fashionable society", and it has been speculated that George Bernard Shaw "drew upon their relationship" for his play Pygmalion.

At his death, he left her £5,000, plus another £5,000 in trust for herself and her sisters (this was the equivalent of around one million pounds today), which was by far the largest bequest he made.

== Acting career ==
Ada Alice became "Dorothy Dene" in 1882 when Leighton became Ada's benefactor. It was adopted as a stage name for her theatrical career. "Dorothy" was chosen by Ada in reference to her younger sister who died in 1877 and the surname Dene was chosen by Leighton.

Dene made her debut as an actress as Maria in The School For Scandal in 1886. Theatre critic Clement Scott predicted great things for her acting career after seeing her first performance. After that she played dramatizations of Bleak House and Called Back along with many classical plays.

In late 1892, Dene traveled to the United States and in New York City she performed in a play produced by the Theater of Arts and Letters. She also performed in other venues in the country. Although the very critical American audience considered her performance to their standards and received many offers from managers, Dene found little success as a performer in America and her 1893 tour was eventually abandoned. In Britain her skill as an actress did not go unnoticed. In 1894, in a tour of A Woman of No Importance, she alternated the roles of Mrs Allonby and Mrs Arbuthnot with the company's other leading lady, Florence West: critics complimented Dene on contrasting the two very different characters successfully. One wrote that she rose "to a height of intense emotional power" in the latter role, another that she played the former "with much charm and grace of manner".

== Later years ==
Some reports mention her spending her last four years as a recluse and that physicians who treated her said "she was dying from consumption, a victim of her own work, in spending long hours, scantily draped, in the not too comfortable studio." She died in London in the summer of 1899 at the age of forty and is buried in Kensal Green Cemetery.

== Gallery ==
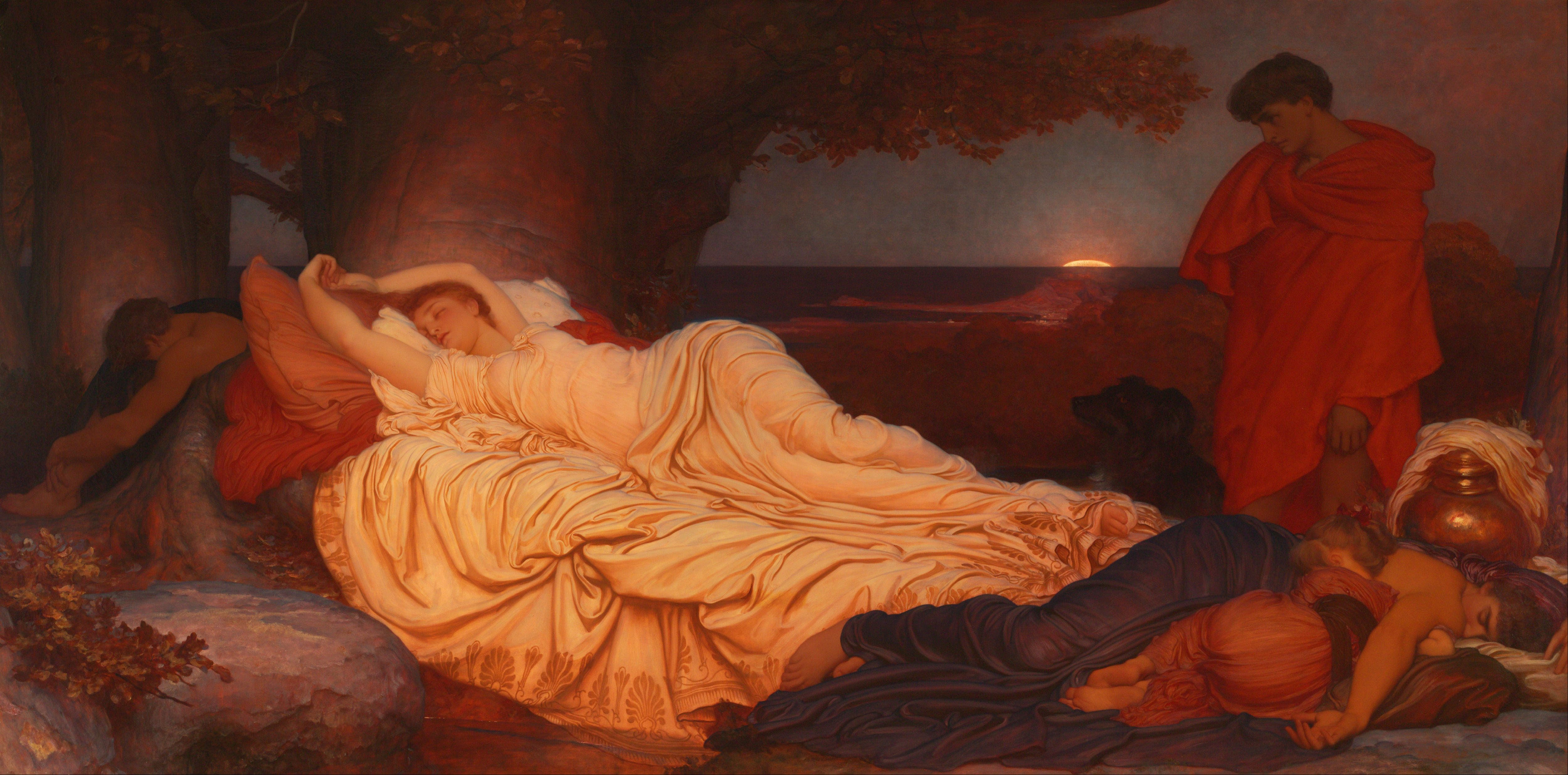
Cymon and Iphigenia, Frederick Leighton, 1884

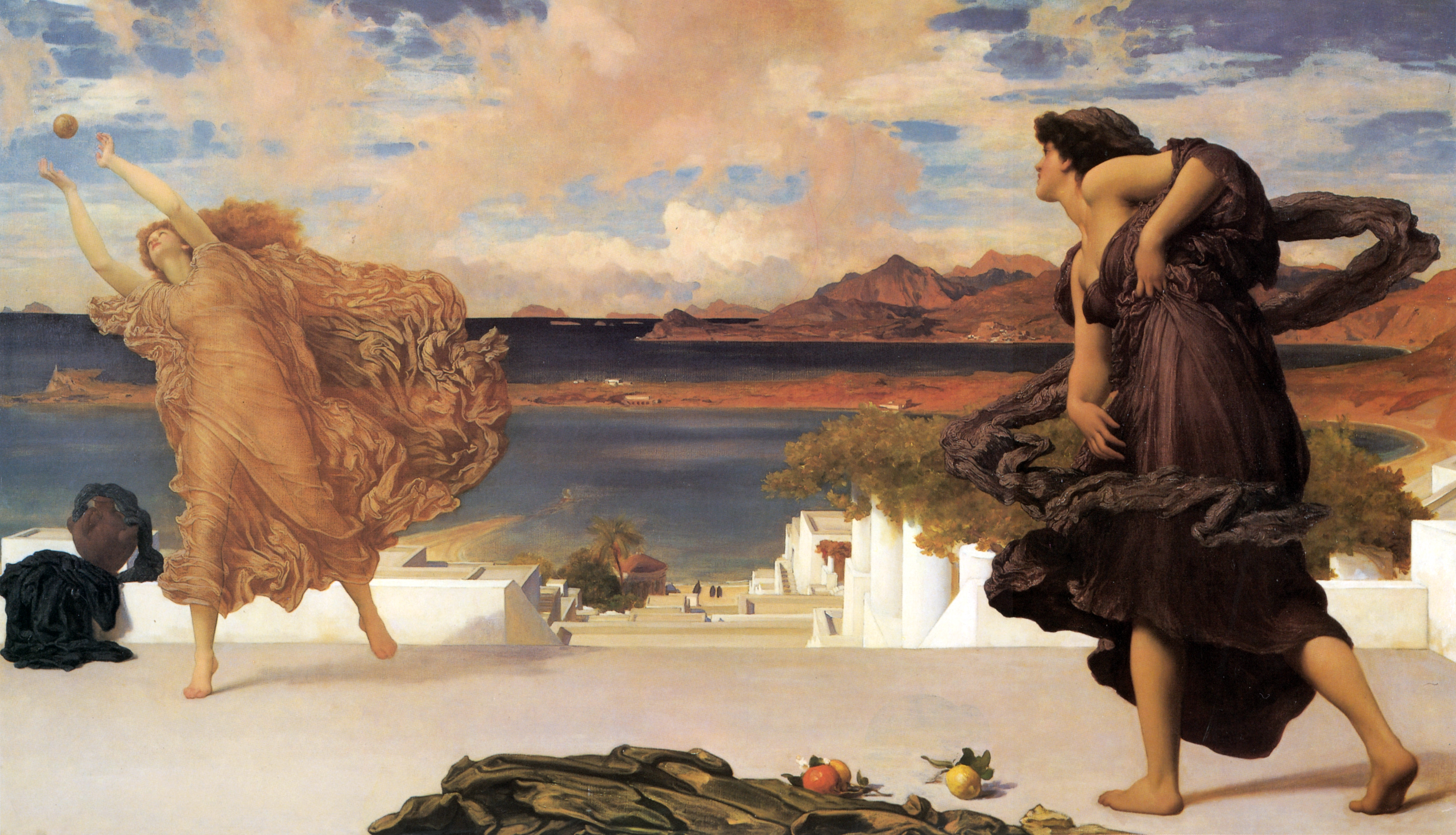
Greek Girls Playing Ball, Frederick Leighton, 1889

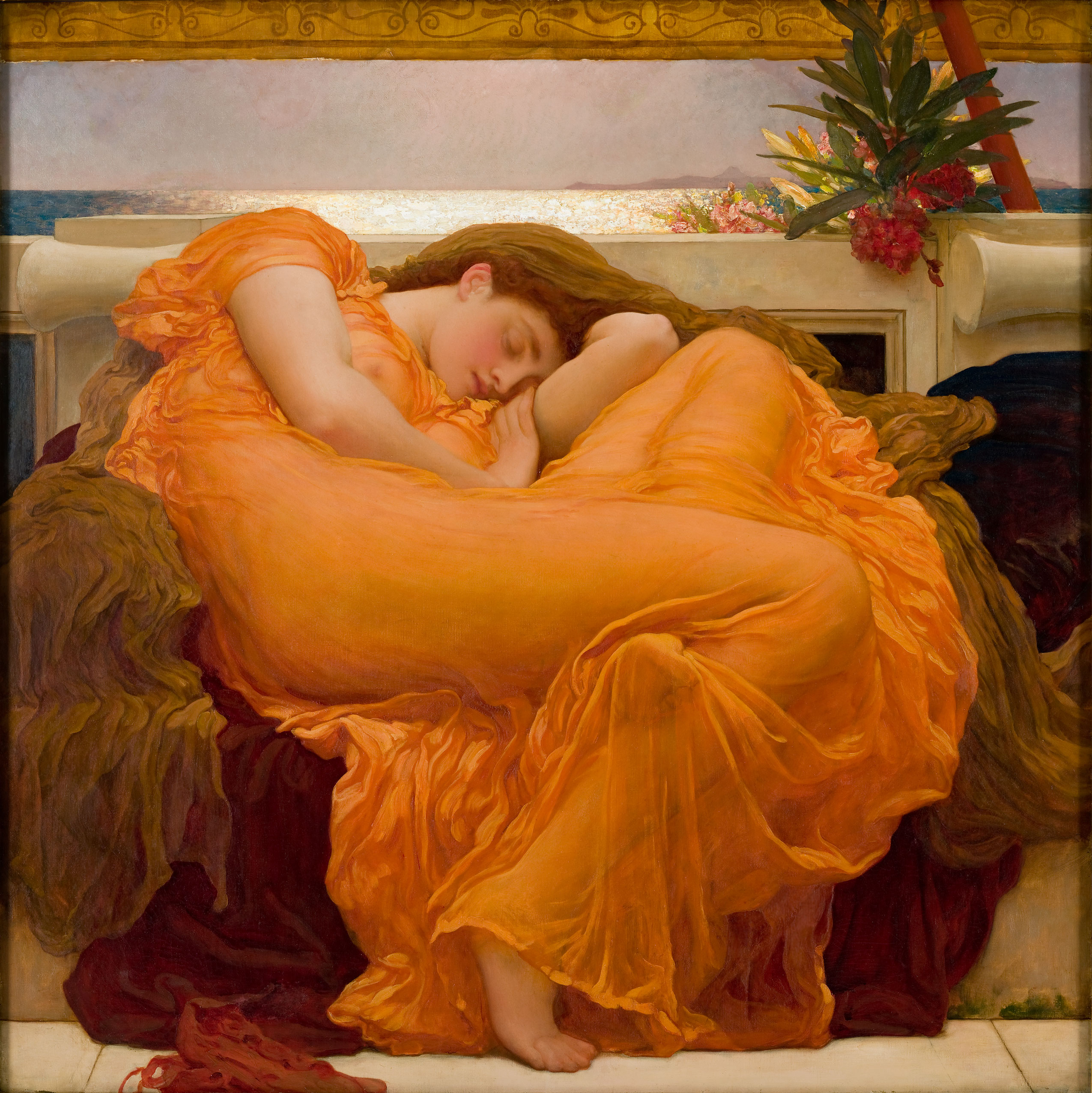
Flaming June, Frederick Leighton, 1895

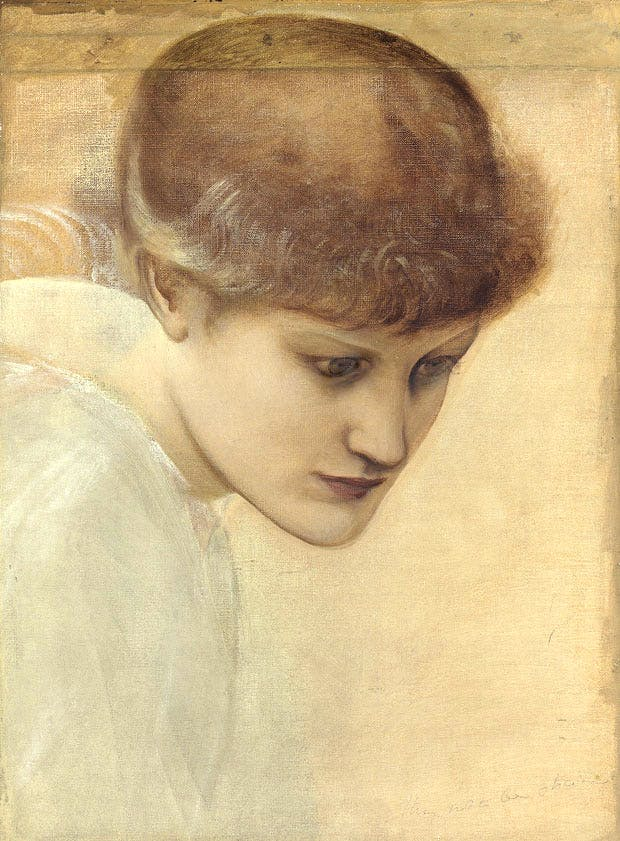
Head study of Dorothy Dene for The Golden Stairs, Edward Burne-Jones, 1880

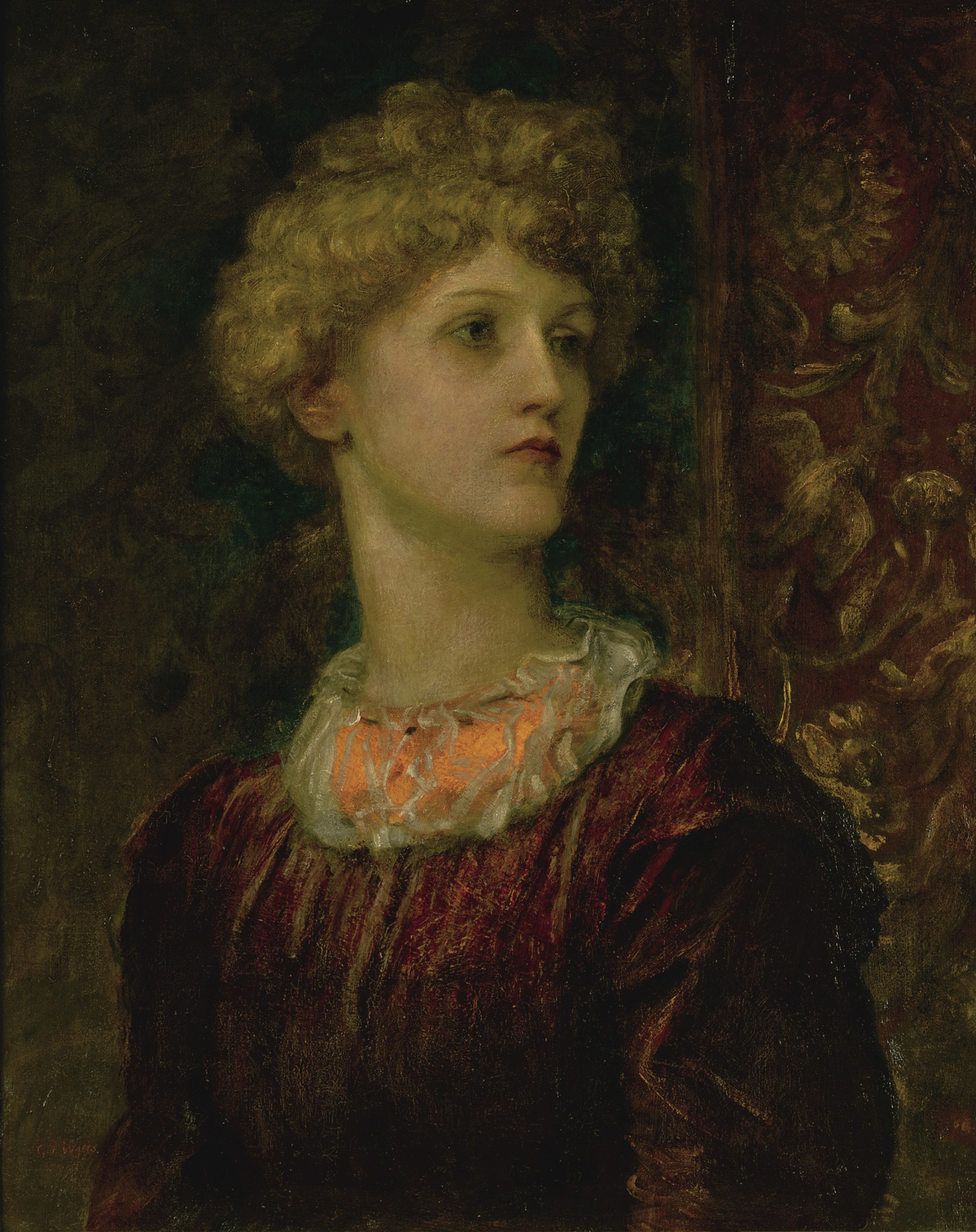
Dorothy Dene, George Frederic Watts, c1888

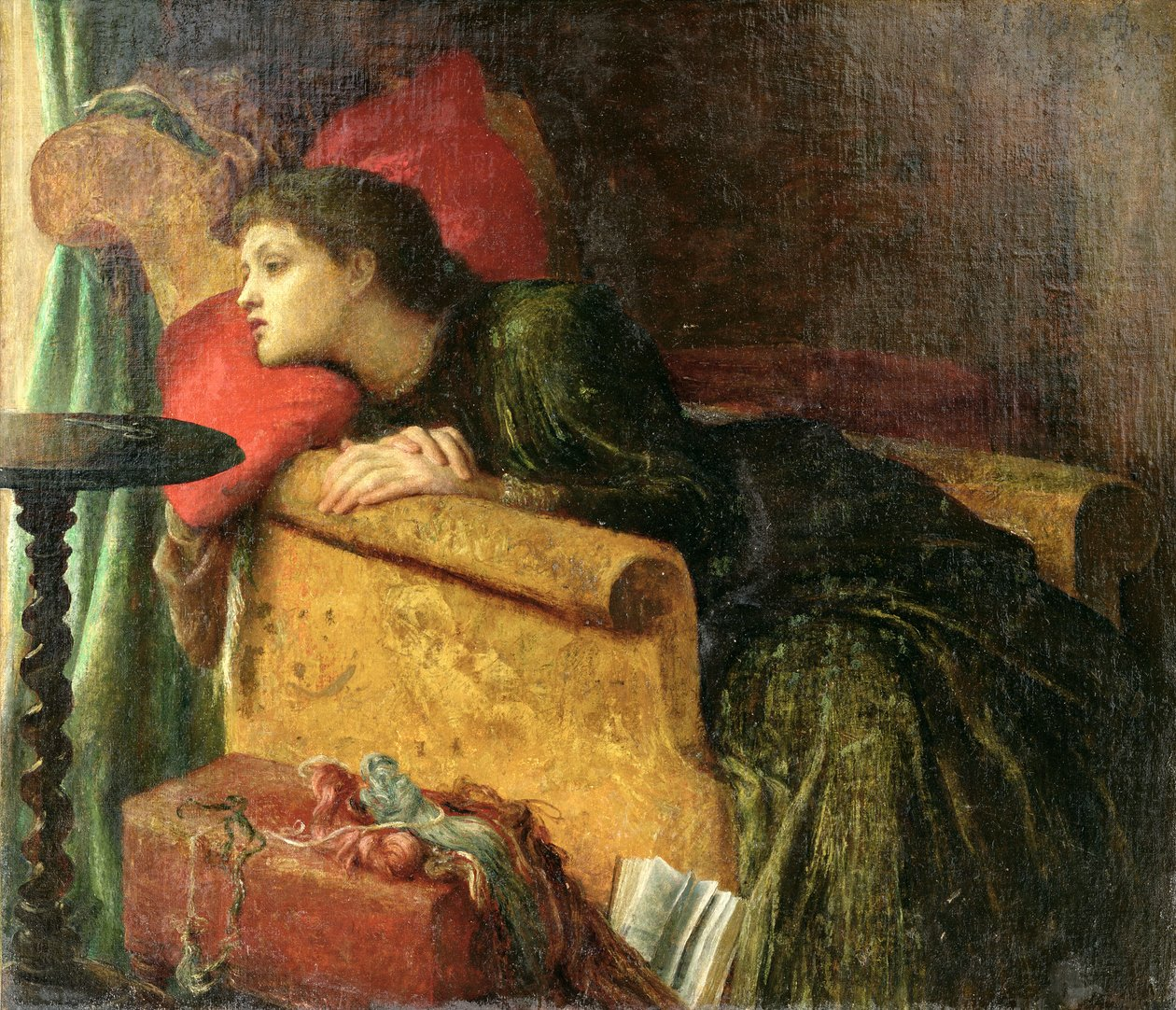
The Rain it Raineth Every Day, George Frederick Watts, 1883
