= Andromeda (painting) =

Painting by Edward Poynter

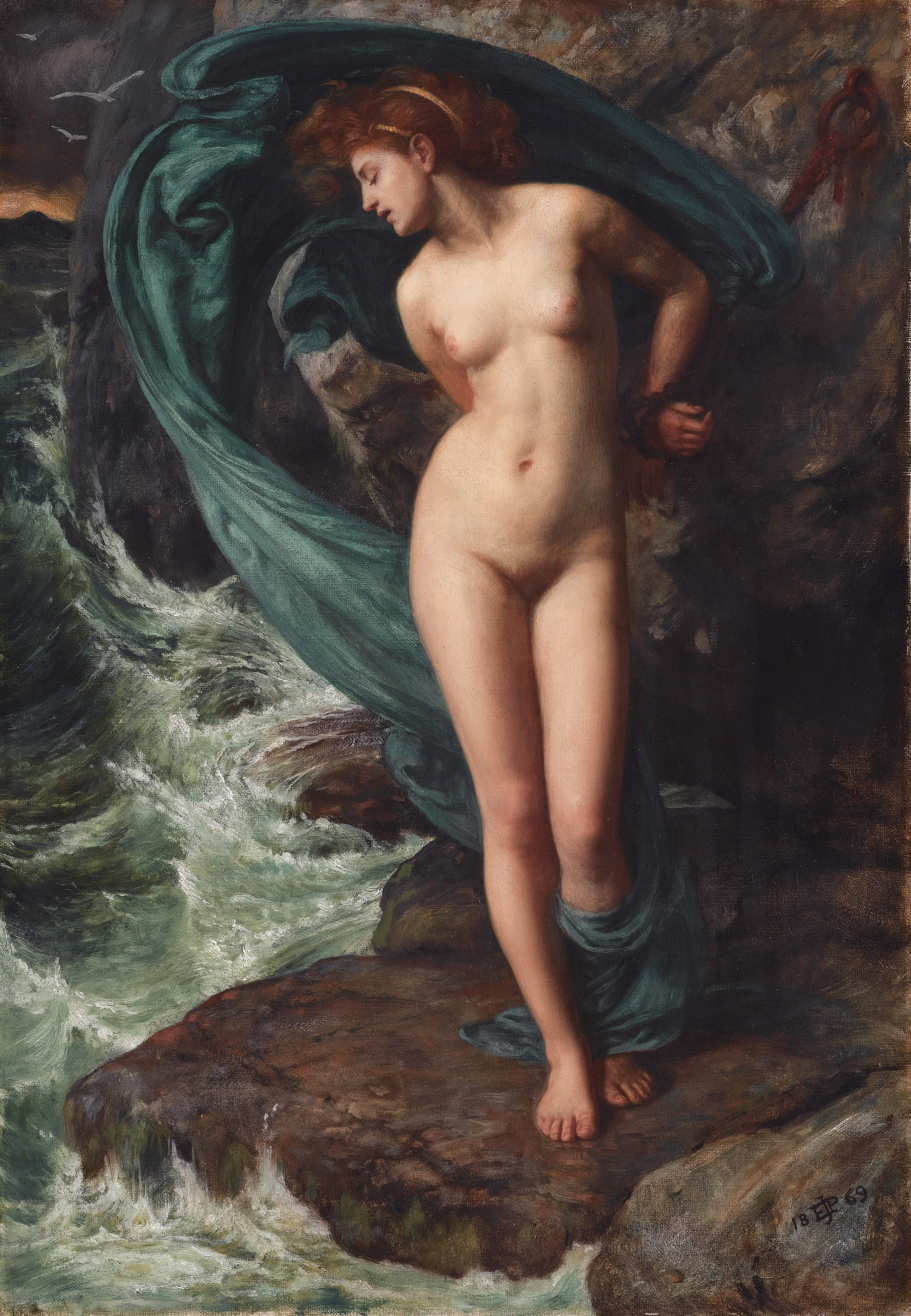
Andromeda (1869) by Edward Poynter

Andromeda is an 1869 oil on canvas painting of Andromeda by Edward Poynter, using the accounts of her rescue in the Metamorphoses and Apollodorus of Athens. The blue cloth tied to her left leg recalls a motif in Titian's Bacchus and Ariadne The model for the body was Antonia Calva (who had also worked with Edward Burne-Jones and Frederic Leighton) and for the face Annie Keene (also photographed by Julia Margaret Cameron). The picture was displayed at the Royal Academy Exhibition of 1870 at Burlington House.

A few years later, in 1871, the artist produced another work showing Andromeda, her rescuer Perseus and the monster Cetus to which she was being sacrificed (destroyed in the Second World War, though an oil sketch for it survives). The 1869 work is now in the private collection of Juan Antonio Pérez Simón in Mexico.
