= The Roses of Heliogabalus =

1888 painting by Lawrence Alma-Tadema

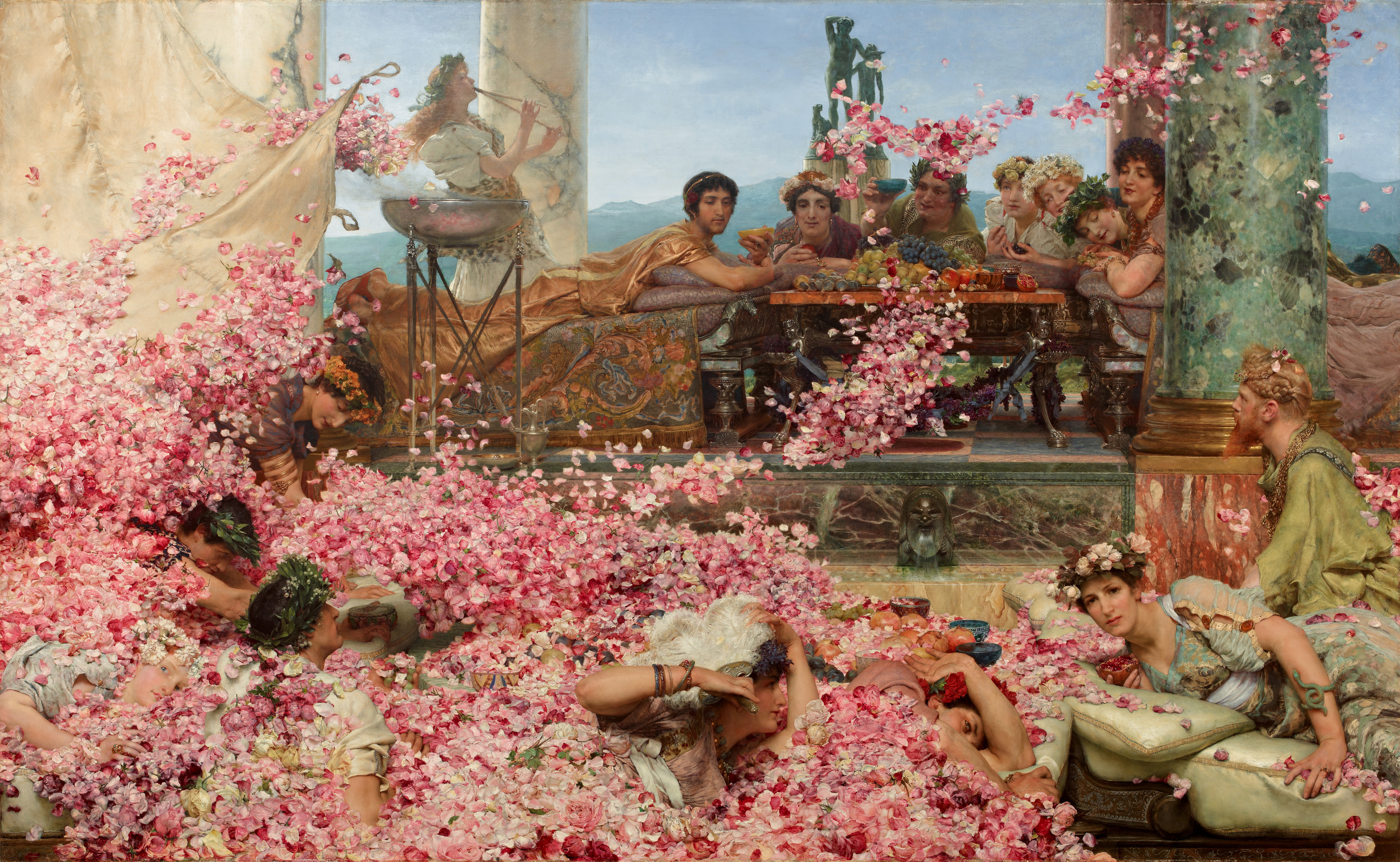
- Artist: Lawrence Alma-Tadema
- Year: 1888
- Medium: oil on canvas
- Dimensions: 132.7 cm × 214.4 cm (52.2 in × 84.4 in)
- Location: Private collection

The Roses of Heliogabalus is an oil painting by the Anglo-Dutch artist Sir Lawrence Alma-Tadema, from 1888. It depicts the young Roman emperor Elagabalus (203–222 AD) hosting a banquet. It is held in a private collection.

== Subject ==
The painting measures 132.7 × 214.4 centimetres (52.2 × 84.4 in). It shows a group of Roman diners at a banquet, being swamped by drifts of pink rose petals falling from a false ceiling above. The youthful Roman emperor Elagabalus, wearing a golden silk robe and tiara, watches the spectacle from a platform behind them, with other garlanded guests. A woman plays the double pipes beside a marble pillar in the background, wearing the leopard skin of a maenad, with a bronze statue of Dionysus, based on the Ludovisi Dionysus, in front of a view of distant hills.

The painting depicts a (probably invented) episode in the life of the Roman emperor Elagabalus, also known as Heliogabalus, taken from the Augustan History. Alma-Tadema depicts Elagabalus smothering his unsuspecting guests with rose petals released from a false ceiling. The original references are:

Stravit et triclinia de rosa et lectos et porticus.

He used to strew roses and all manner of flowers ... over his banqueting-rooms, his couches and his porticoes.

Oppressit in tricliniis versatilibus parasitos suos violis et floribus, sic ut animam aliqui efflaverint, cum erepere ad summum non possent.

In a banqueting-room with a reversible ceiling, he once buried his guests in violets and other flowers, so that some were actually smothered to death, being unable to crawl out to the top.

In his notes to the Augustan History, Magie notes that "Nero did this also (Suetonius, Nero, xxxi), and a similar ceiling in the house of Trimalchio is described in Petronius, Sat., lx." (Satyricon).

== History ==
The painting was commissioned by Sir John Aird, 1st Baronet for £4,000 in 1888. As roses were out of season in the United Kingdom, Alma-Tadema is reputed to have had rose petals sent from the south of France each week during the four months in which it was painted.

The painting was exhibited at the Royal Academy summer exhibition in 1888. Aird died in 1911, and the painting was inherited by his son Sir John Richard Aird, 2nd Baronet. After Alma-Tadema died in 1912, the painting was exhibited at a memorial exhibition at the Royal Academy in 1913, the last time it was seen at a public exhibition in the UK until 2014.

Alma-Tadema's reputation declined markedly in the decades after his death. Following the death of the 2nd Baronet in 1934, the painting was sold by his son, the 3rd Baronet, in 1935 for 483 guineas. It failed to sell at Christie's in 1960 and was "bought in" by the auction house for 100 guineas. Next, it was acquired by Allen Funt: he was the producer of Candid Camera and a collector of Alma-Tadema's at a time when the artist remained very unfashionable. After Funt experienced financial troubles, he sold the painting along with the rest of his collection at Sotheby's in London in November 1973, achieving a price of £28,000. The painting was sold again by American collector Frederick Koch at Christie's in London in June 1993 for £1,500,000. It is currently owned by the Spanish-Mexican billionaire businessman and art collector Juan Antonio Pérez Simón.

== Exhibitions ==
- The painting was included in an exhibition at the Metropolitan Museum of Art in New York in March and April 1973 (when the owner was Allen Funt).
- The painting is part of a private collection but was on display from 14 November 2014 to 29 March 2015 at the Leighton House Museum in London as part of the exhibition A Victorian Obsession: The Pérez Simón collection at Leighton House Museum, the first time since Alma-Tadema's memorial exhibition at the Royal Academy in 1913, that it has been exhibited in London. It returned to the Leighton House Museum from 7 July to 29 October 2017 for the exhibition "Alma-Tadema: At Home in Antiquity."
- The painting was a part of an exhibition of Lawrence Alma-Tadema's paintings in Belvedere, Vienna, Austria from 24 February 2017 to 18 June 2017.
- La Pluie de roses D'Héliogabale is a separate yet similar painting, recorded to have been displayed at the 1880 Paris Salon, done by an artist under the name A. Heullant, likely Félix Armand Heullant.
- Between 20 September 2024 and 12 January 2025 the painting was displayed at the cultural centre CentroCentro, inside the Cybele Palace, town hall of the Madrid, as a part of the exhibition Seventy Great Masters from the Pérez Simón Collection.
