= Juan Antonio Pérez Simón =

Spanish businessman and art collector

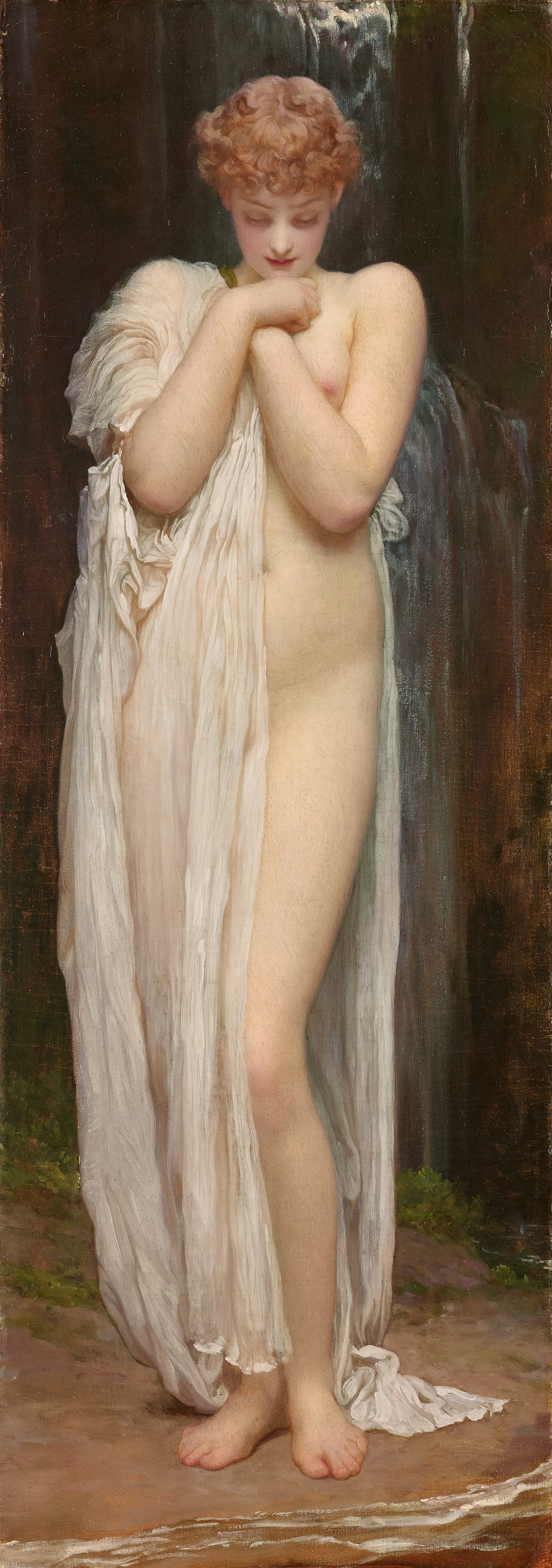
Crenaia, the Nymph of the Dargle, Frederic Leighton, oil on canvas, 1880. Model, Dorothy Dene. Part of the Pérez Simón collection on loan to the Leighton House Museum, 2014–15.

Juan Antonio Pérez Simón (born 1941) is a Spanish businessman and art collector, resident in Mexico, who became rich in the telecommunications business. Pérez Simón has assembled a collection of over 3000 paintings, including works by Dalí, Goya, El Greco, Rubens, Van Gogh and Monet. In 2010, Paris Match described the collection as the largest in private hands in the world.

== Early life and career ==
Pérez Simón was just 5 years of age when his family emigrated to Mexico. They were not wealthy. They travelled by sea in third class accommodation for 28 days before eventually arriving in Mexico City after spending a month in Cuba. Pérez Simón's father worked in the beverages business and his son educated himself in economics and accountancy. Pérez Simón met Carlos Slim when they were both young men. They went into business in 1976 as partners in the Carso Group with Pérez Simón taking a minority 30% stake. In May 2014, the firm had a stock market capitalisation of over US$12 billion.

== Art collection ==
Pérez Simón's interest in art began as a teenager. He started collecting in his 20s, first prints and cheap Mexican landscape paintings as for some time he and his wife had little money. Today, Pérez Simón's collection includes works from the fourteenth century onwards but he does not enjoy contemporary art, feeling that it is too intellectual and lacks emotion.

The Carso Group has its own collection and museum, and Pérez Simón coordinates with his partner Carlos Slim in order that they do not compete against each other for the same works. Pérez Simón claims never to refuse a request for a loan of one of his pictures.

== A Victorian Obsession ==
From November 2014 to March 2015, fifty paintings owned by Pérez Simón were put on display at London's Leighton House Museum in the exhibition A Victorian Obsession: The Pérez Simón collection. The permanent collection of the museum was placed in storage to allow the works to be hung throughout the house. The selected works were those of Frederic Leighton and other important British Victorian painters, many of whom Leighton would have known, such as Lawrence Alma-Tadema, Albert Moore, Dante Gabriel Rossetti, Edward Burne-Jones, John Everett Millais, John William Waterhouse, Edward Poynter, John Melhuish Strudwick and John William Godward. The paintings were not labelled, in order that they fit in with the decor of the house.

As part of the exhibition, Lawrence Alma-Tadema's The Roses of Heliogabalus (1888) was exhibited in London for the first time since Alma-Tadema's memorial exhibition at the Royal Academy in 1913.

In his review of the exhibition, Waldemar Januszczak of The Sunday Times, described the works included as "demented escapism" and Pérez Simón as "Mexico's richest lover of droopy damsels in distress and muscular Greek nymphettes".

=== Works from the Pérez Simón collection ===
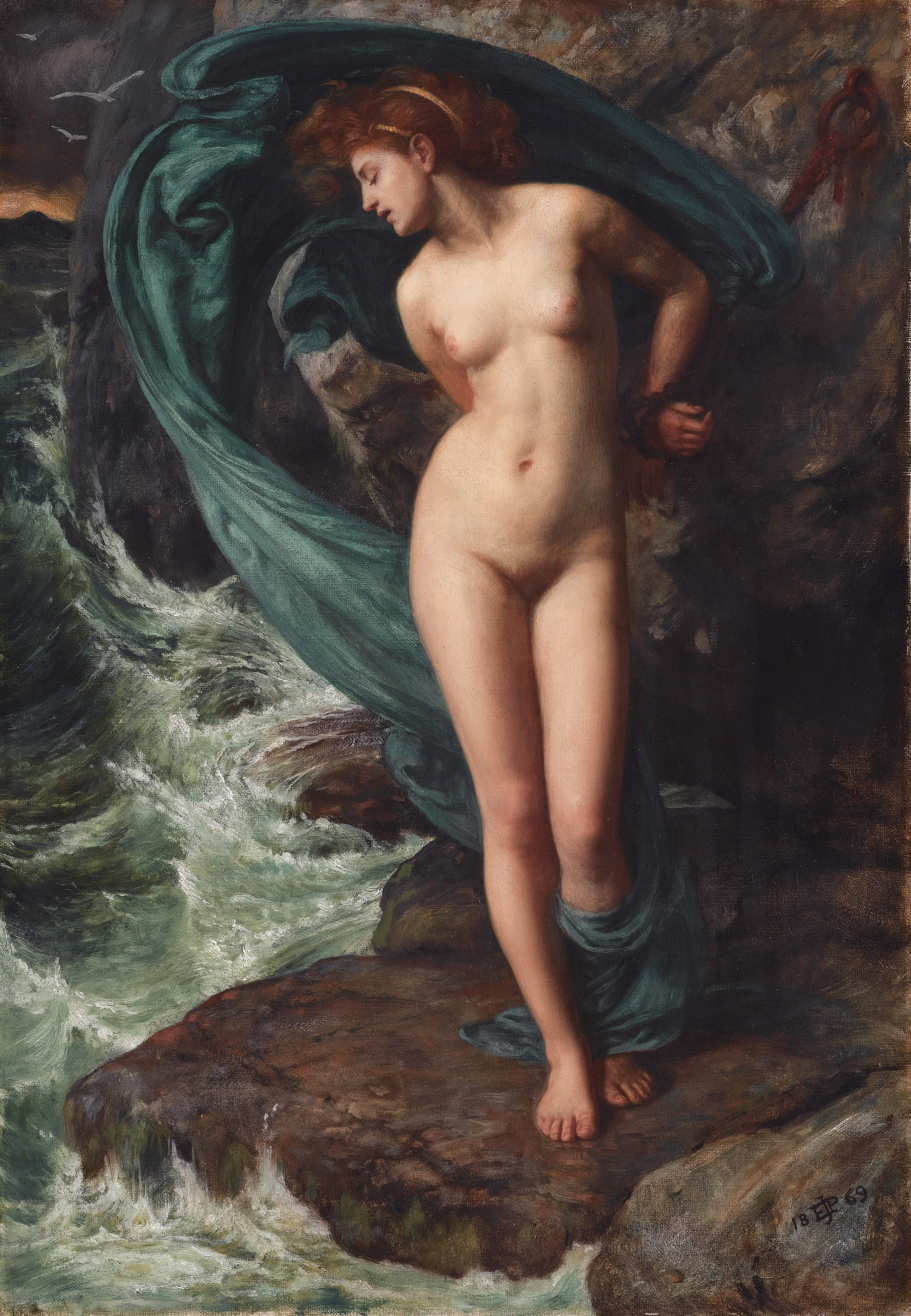
Andromeda. Edward Poynter, 1869

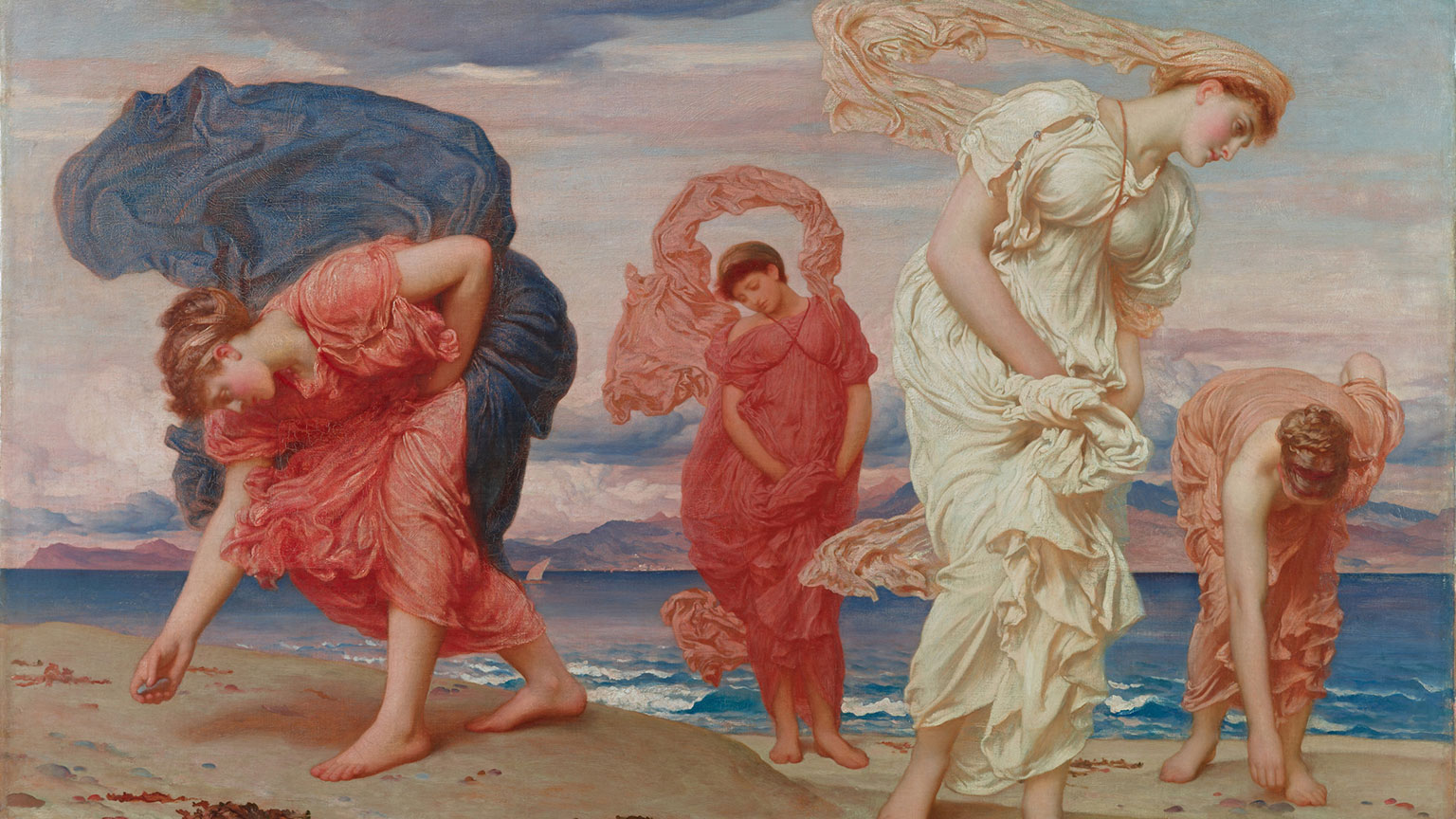
Greek Girls Picking up Pebbles by the Sea. Frederic Leighton, 1871.

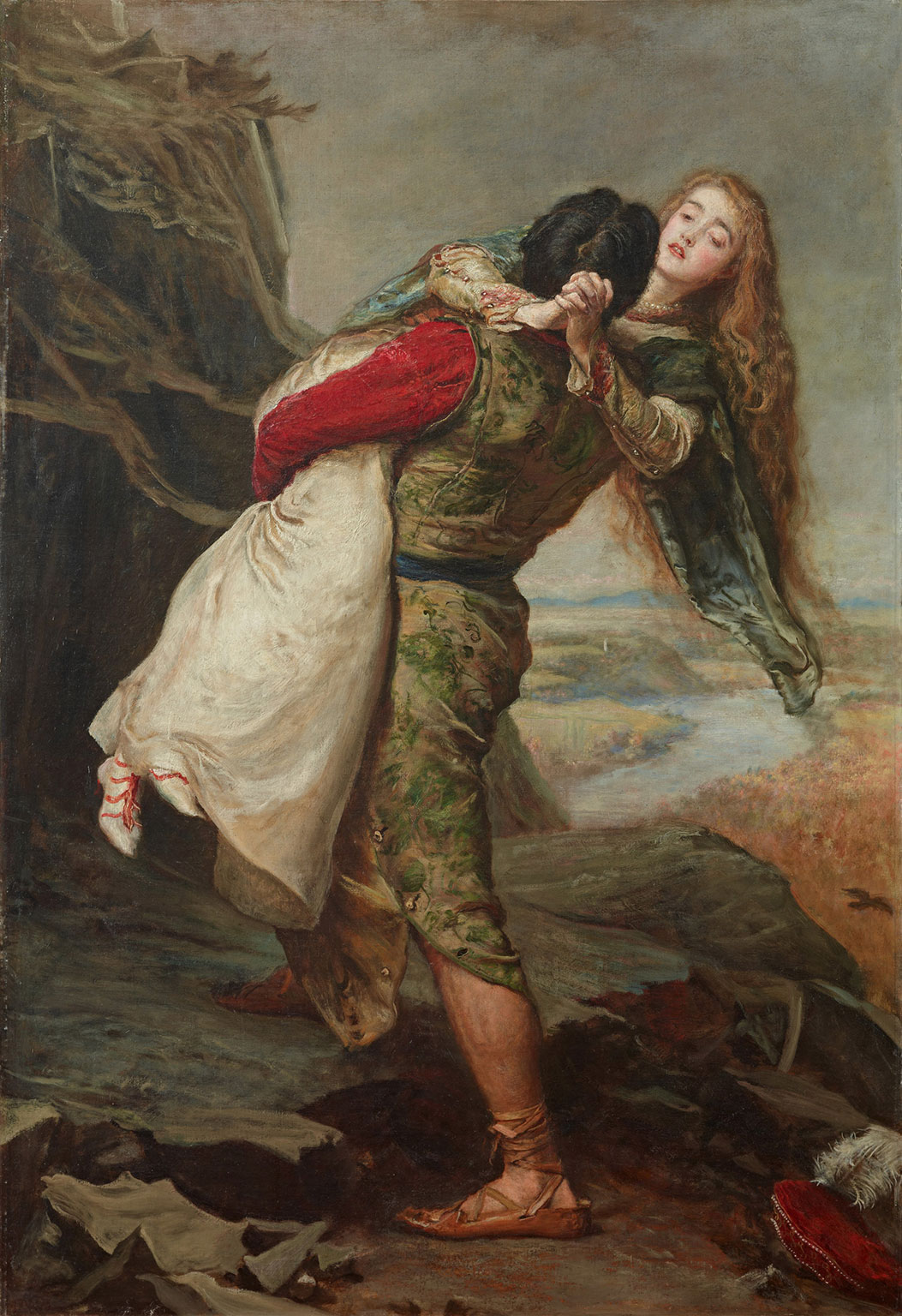
The Crown of Love. John Everett Millais, 1875.

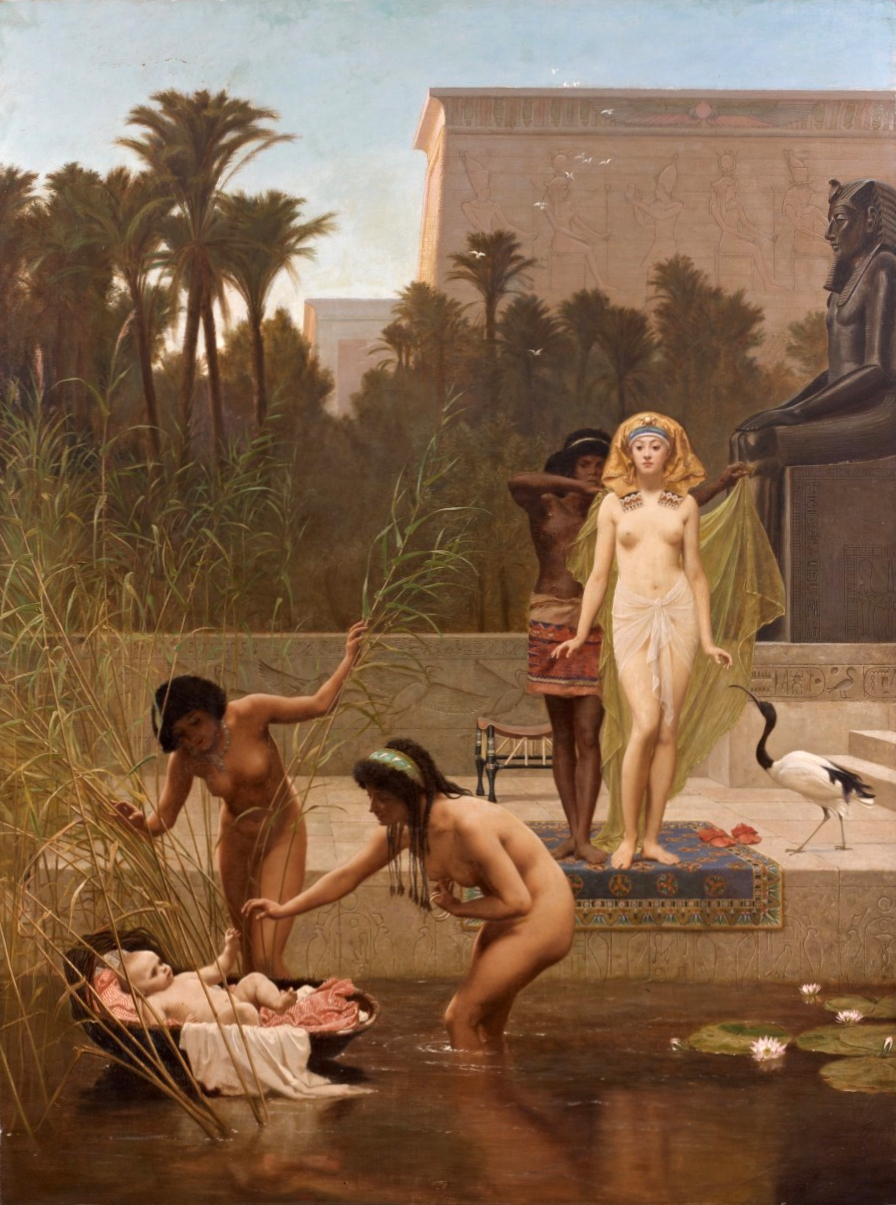
The Finding of Moses. Frederick Goodall, 1885.

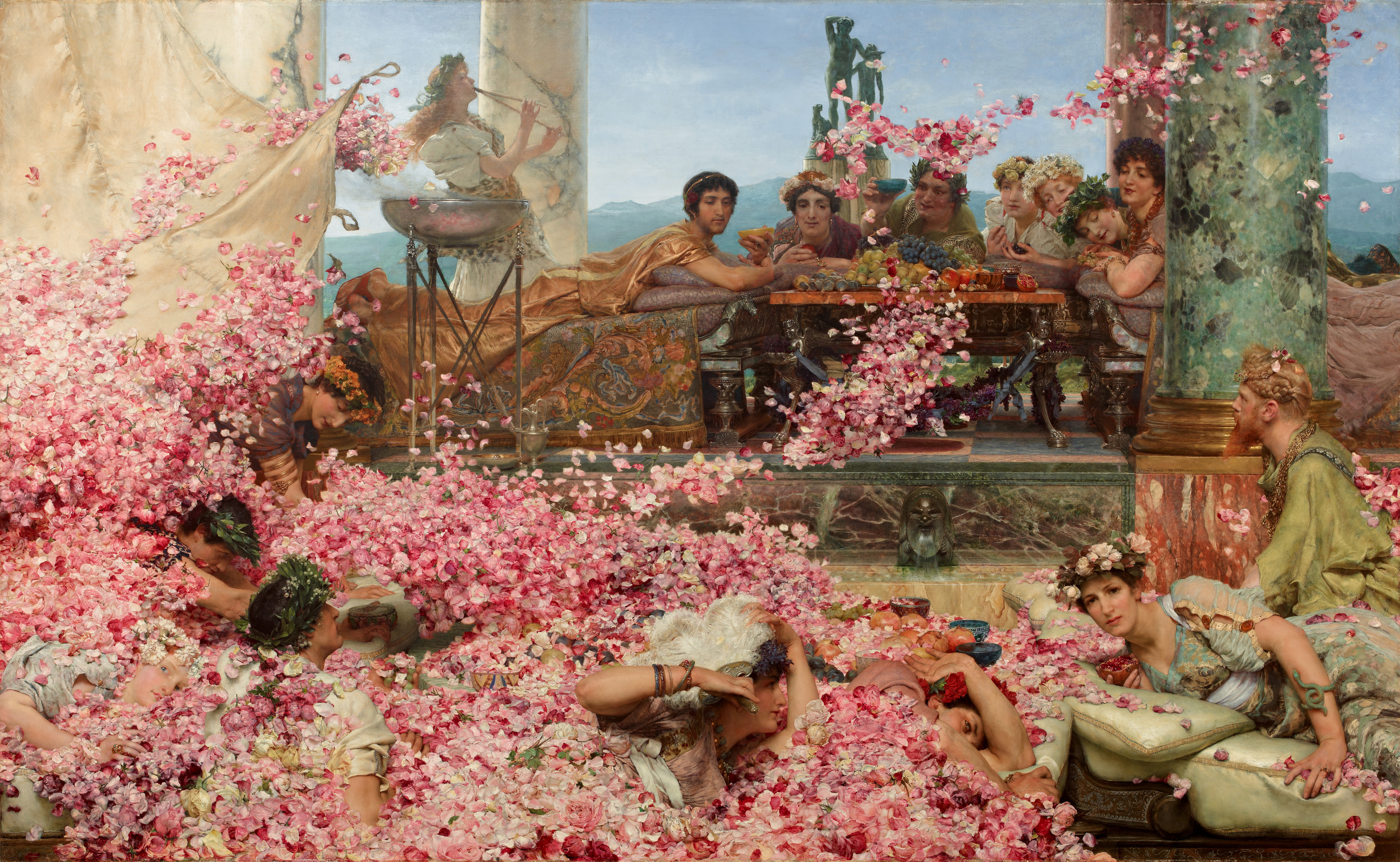
The Roses of Heliogabalus. Lawrence Alma-Tadema, 1888.

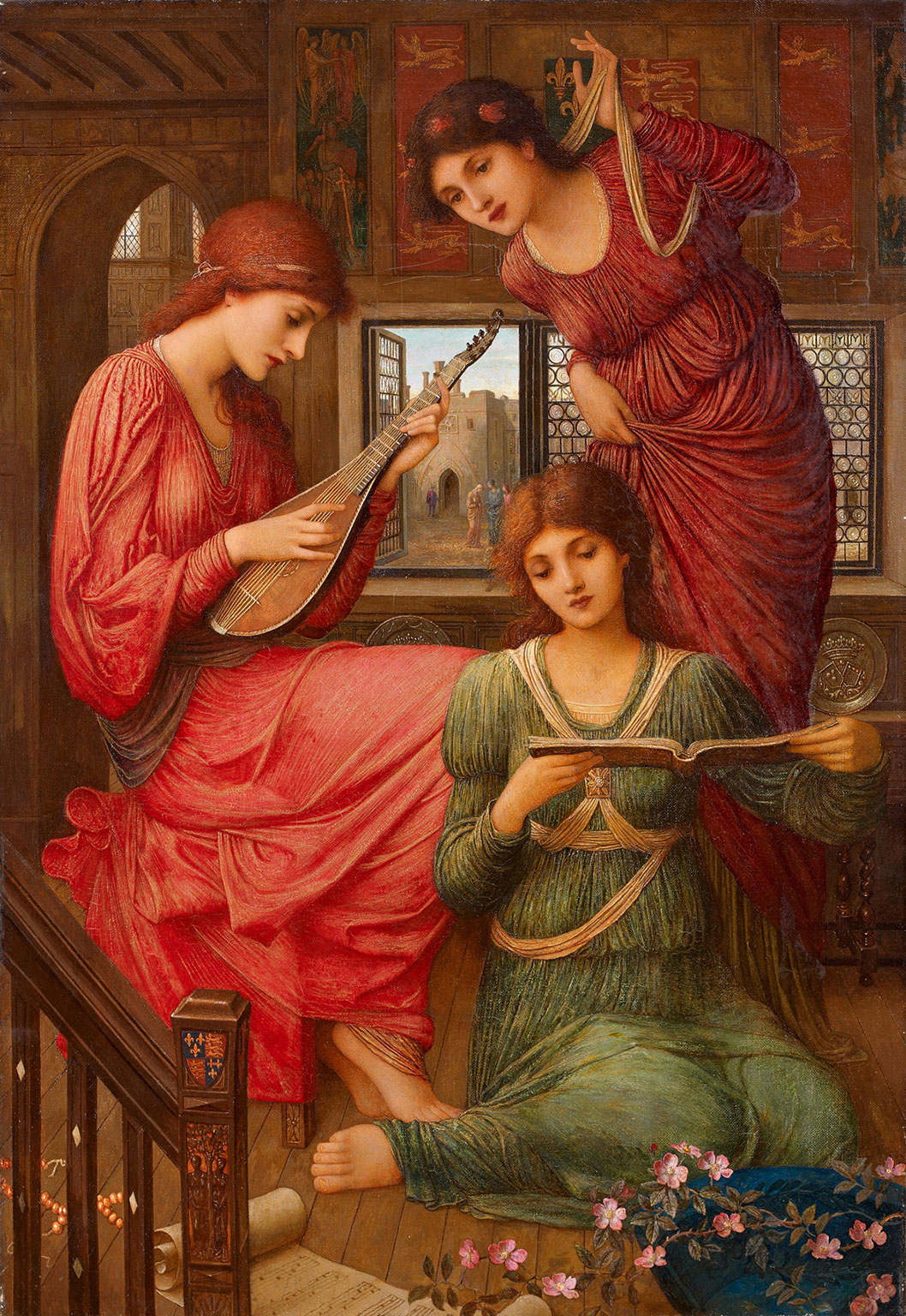
In the Golden Days. John Melhuish Strudwick, 1907.

== Family ==
Pérez Simón is married to Josefina. They have a daughter María José, married with Jorge, and two grandchildren.
