= Florence West (actress) =

English actress (1858–1912)

Florence West, c. 1900

Florence Isabella Brandon (15 December 1858 – 14 November 1912), known by her stage name Florence West, was an English actress, who created roles in new plays by Oscar Wilde and Bernard Shaw. She married the actor Lewis Waller and frequently appeared with him in the West End and on tour until her retirement in 1905.

== Life and career ==
=== Early years ===
In Called Back, 1885

West was born on 15 December 1858 in Putney, near London, the eldest daughter of Horatio Brandon, a solicitor. She married William Waller Lewis – later known as the actor Lewis Waller – in April 1882. They had a son and a daughter. Having, like her husband, played in amateur theatricals, she aimed for a professional career as an actress. She wrote to the actor-manager J. L. Toole for advice; once he had assured himself that she was not, in his words, "a stage-struck damsel" but ready to learn her craft thoroughly, he took her into his company. She made her debut in 1883, in the leading role of Mary Belton in H. J. Byron's Uncle Dick's Darling at Toole's Theatre.

After this, West played Mary Melrose in Our Boys on tour with David James. In a touring stage version of the novel Called Back she played Pauline. For a time she appeared with Helena Modjeska's company. With a touring company under her own direction she played Philippa Larfarge in Dark Days. Subsequently she appeared with Fannie Leslie's company as Milly De Vere in Jack-in-the-Box, first played in the provinces, and then brought to the Strand Theatre, London in February 1887. In the following July, West appeared at the Prince of Wales's Theatre in a one-off performance of Obed Snow's Philanthropy. She made what The Era called "a notable success" in William Lestocq's In Danger, produced at the Vaudeville Theatre in November 1887.

At the Olympic Theatre in January 1888, West played May Edwards in A revival of Tom Taylor's The Ticket-of-Leave Man. She subsequently replaced Eva Sothern in The Mystery of a Hansom Cab at the Princess's Theatre. In To the Death, Rutland Barrington's adaptation of Mr. Barnes of New York, produced at the Olympic in March 1888, West played Marita.

=== 1890–1912 ===
With Lewis Waller and Julia Neilson (right) in the premiere of An Ideal Husband, 1895

In the early 1890s West appeared in His Last Stake and The Still Alarm at the Princess's, Gladys, or, the Golden Key, at the Avenue, A Convict's Wife at the Strand, My Lady Help at the Shaftesbury Theatre, The Henrietta at the Avenue, A Night's Frolic at the Strand, and The Scapegoat, Gloriana and Mariana at the Globe Theatre. After a break from acting, West appeared with Waller in 1894 in a provincial tour of The Profligate and A Woman of No Importance. In the latter, she alternated the roles of Mrs Arbuthnot and Mrs Allonby with the company's other leading lady, Dorothy Dene.

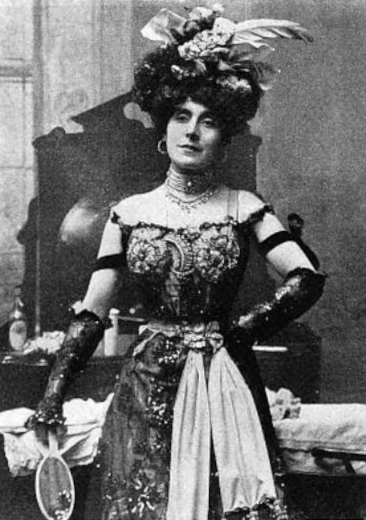
As Zaza, 1902

At the Haymarket Theatre in January 1895 West created the role of Mrs Cheveley in the premiere of Oscar Wilde's An Ideal Husband. Later in 1895 she played Mrs Thorpe Didsbury in The Home Secretary, Kate Creegen in Hall Caine's The Manxman and Leah D'Acosta in A Woman's Reason, at the Shaftesbury. At the same theatre she appeared with Waller and Nina Boucicault in a new comedy, A Match-Maker, before touring in A Woman's Reason in the latter part of 1896. In July 1897 she created the role of The Strange Lady in Bernard Shaw's The Man of Destiny, and later that year appeared with her husband in Sydney Grundy's A Marriage of Convenience. She played Miladi to Waller's D'Artagnan in Henry Hamilton's adaptation of The Three Musketeers in 1898. In 1900 she played the title role in a stage version of Tess of the D'Urbervilles. From about this time she was generally billed as "Mrs Lewis Waller".

In 1901 West played the title role in David Belasco's adaptation of Zaza, a play that occupied most of the rest of her career; she presented and starred in it in London, the British provinces and in South Africa between 1901 and 1905. In 1902 she toured in San Toy, and announced her retirement from the stage in 1905. She reappeared briefly in 1908 making music hall appearances in condensed versions of The Three Musketeers and The Admiral's Lady.

She died on 14 November 1912 at Bognor Regis, Sussex, aged 53.

== References and sources ==
=== Sources ===
- Wearing, J. P. (1976). The London Stage, 1890–1899: A Calendar of Plays and Players. Metuchen: Scarecrow Press. ISBN 978-0-81-080910-9.
- Wearing, J. P. (1981). The London Stage, 1900–1909: A Calendar of Plays and Players. Metuchen: Scarecrow Press. OCLC 1245534136.
- Wilde, Oscar (1966). Plays. London: Penguin. OCLC 16004478.
