= Flaming June =

1895 painting by Frederic Leighton

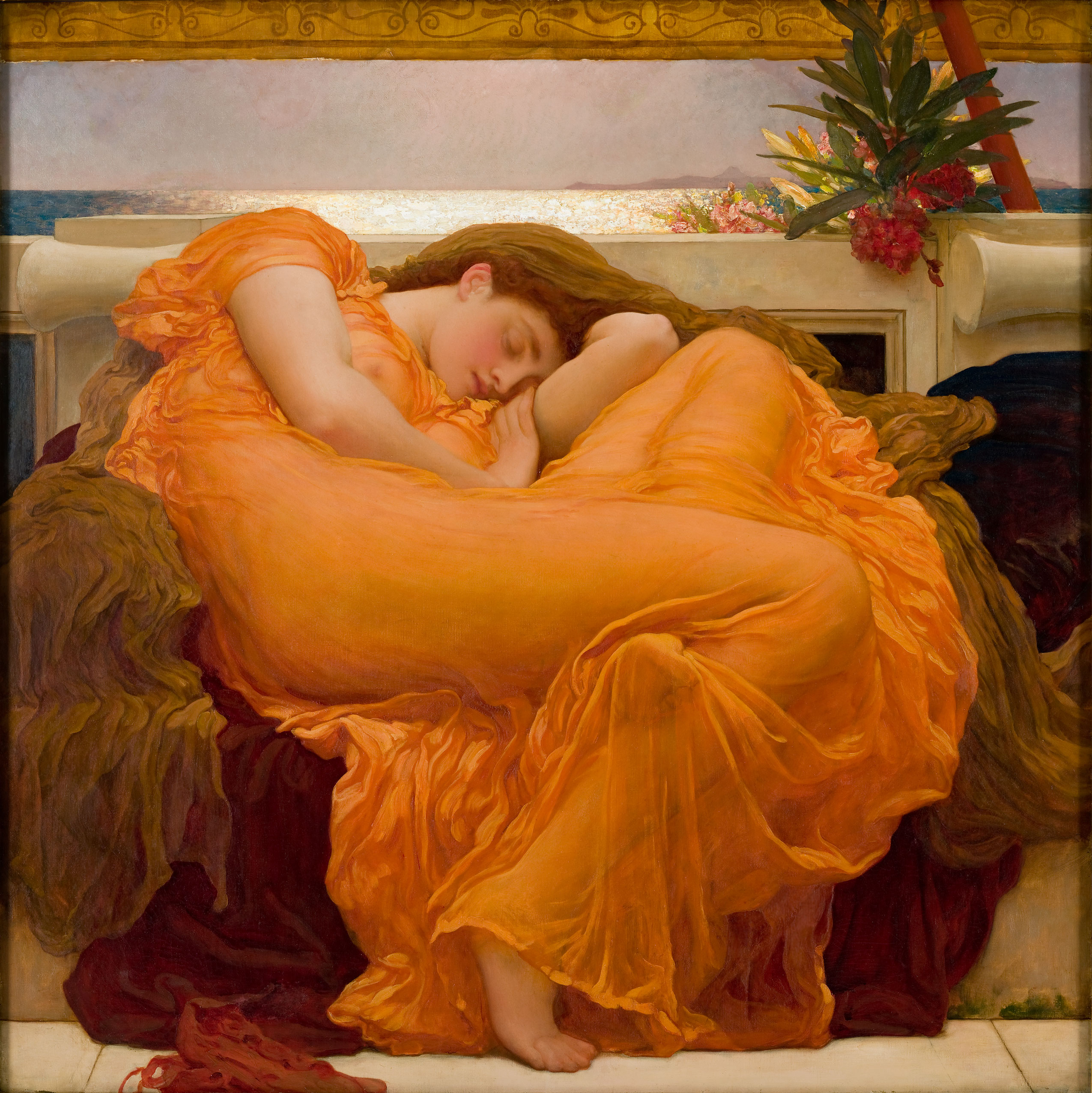
- Artist: Frederic Leighton
- Year: 1895
- Medium: Oil on canvas
- Dimensions: 1.2 m × 1.2 m (47 in × 47 in)
- Location: Wadsworth Atheneum, Hartford, Connecticut

Flaming June is a painting by Sir Frederic Leighton, produced in 1895. Painted with oil paints on a 47-by-47-inch (1.2 m × 1.2 m) square canvas, it depicts a sleeping woman in a sensuous version of his classicist Academic style. It is Leighton's most recognisable work, and is much reproduced in posters and other media.

The painting disappeared from view in the 1930s and was rediscovered in the 1960s. It was auctioned shortly after, during a period of time known to be difficult for selling Victorian-era paintings, where it failed to sell for its low reserve price of US$140 (the equivalent of $1,126 in modern prices). After the auction, it was promptly purchased by the Museo de Arte de Ponce in Ponce, Puerto Rico. It was brought back to the UK to be displayed at the Royal Academy of Art in 2024 where it was presented as the masterpiece by the artist for his retrospective.

The painting has been on loan since 5 November 2026 to the Wadsworth Atheneum in Hartford, Connecticut as the Museo de Arte de Ponce has been undergoing structural repairs.

== Appraisal ==
Flaming June was first begun as a motif to adorn a marble bath in one of Leighton's other works, Summer Slumber. He became so attached to the design that he decided to create it as a painting in its own right.

The funereal solemnity of Michelangelo's monumental nude has been considerably warmed up, by the Victorian painter, in the act of appropriating and adapting it. Leighton has arranged matters in such a way that, although clothed, his somnolent girl's many charms are alluringly displayed for the delectation of the viewer – who is implicitly put in the position of a voyeur... Her cheeks are flushed, reddened with a blush suggesting that somehow she knows she is being watched, even though she is sleeping.

According to art historian Andrew Graham-Dixon "her pose is loosely modelled on that of Michelangelo's famous statue of Night, in the Medici Tombs in Florence, which Leighton regarded as one of the supreme achievements of Western art." The position of the sleeping woman gave Leighton a great deal of trouble. He made several preliminary sketches to determine the way in which she should lie; in particular he had difficulty making the angle of her right arm look natural. His studies show that the picture went through at least four evolutionary sketches before Leighton came to the end result. Out of these studies, four are nude and one is draped. The draped figure looks the least lifelike, demonstrating Leighton's claimed need to draw from a naked model to achieve a fidelity to nature.

The toxic oleander branch in the top right possibly symbolizes the fragile link between sleep and death.

Flaming June has become Leighton's most recognisable picture. Samuel Courtauld, founder of the Courtauld Institute, called it "the most wonderful painting in existence". The realism of the transparent material worn by the sleeping woman, the stunningly rich colours and the perfectly recreated marble surround are characteristic of Leighton's work, as is his use of natural light. He allows the sunset in the background to appear as molten gold. It has inspired photography with its realism and symbolism in the 20th century, most notably Herbert List's work on Santorini and the enfleshed human soul as an island onto itself. The painting's metaphysical allusions include classical poetry by Pindar with its self-referentiality of union between the viewer, the subject, and the role of noetic imagination in deciphering human existence.

== Provenance ==
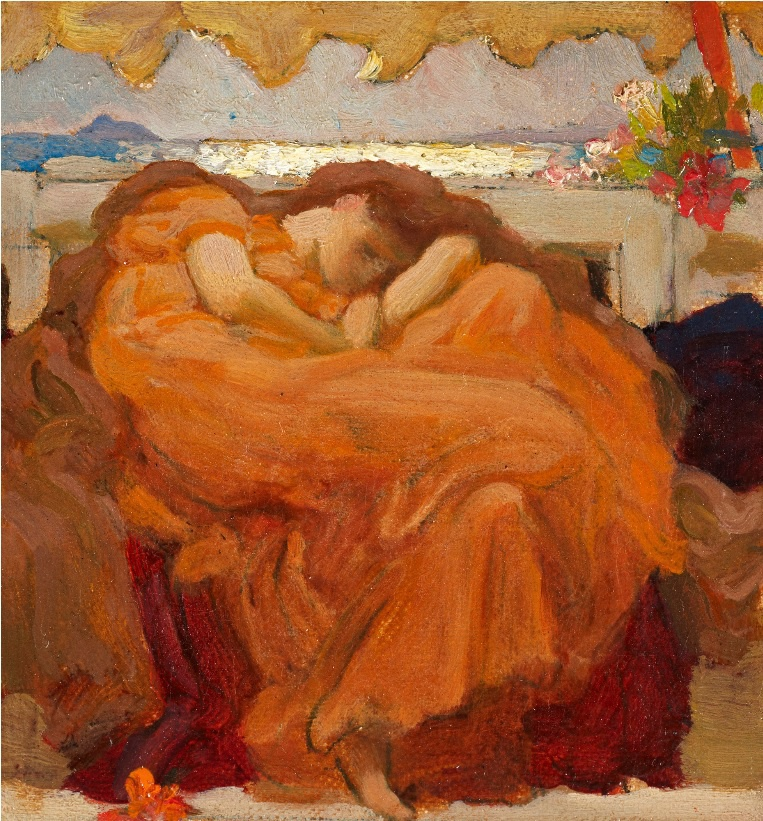
Leighton's study for Flaming June

The painting's first owners, The Graphic magazine, bought it to create a high-quality reproduction which was given away as a Christmas gift in 1895. When Leighton died in January 1896 it was put in their office window which was passed by the funeral procession. It was loaned to the Ashmolean Museum in early 1900s; its whereabouts after this are unknown. The painting was rediscovered in a Battersea home in the early 1960s, boxed in over a chimney. Andrew Lloyd Webber saw it soon afterwards in a shop on the Kings Road, but his grandmother refused to lend him the £50 asking price, stating: "I will not have Victorian junk in my flat".

In 1963 Luis A. Ferré – the noted Puerto Rican industrialist and politician, who would be elected governor five years later – purchased it in Amsterdam for less than $1,000 while on a trip around Europe, engaged in purchasing paintings and sculptures for the Museo de Arte de Ponce in Puerto Rico, which he had founded.

Once it had become part of Museo de Arte de Ponce's collection, it became its symbol and most recognized artwork. Since then, the painting has been loaned to several museums around the world including the Museo del Prado in Madrid in 2008, the Staatsgalerie Stuttgart in Germany in 2009, and the Frick Collection in New York City in 2015.

In 2016 the painting was loaned to the Leighton House Museum in Kensington, and was displayed in the studio where it was created.

In 2015 an original pencil-and-chalk study for the painting – the model's head – was found on the back of a bedroom door in the mansion inherited by Bamber Gascoigne after the death of his great-aunt Mary Innes-Ker, Duchess of Roxburghe.

In 2023 Leighton's only known colour study for the painting, a small work in oil, was presented to Leighton House Museum by Sir David Verey.

== Models ==
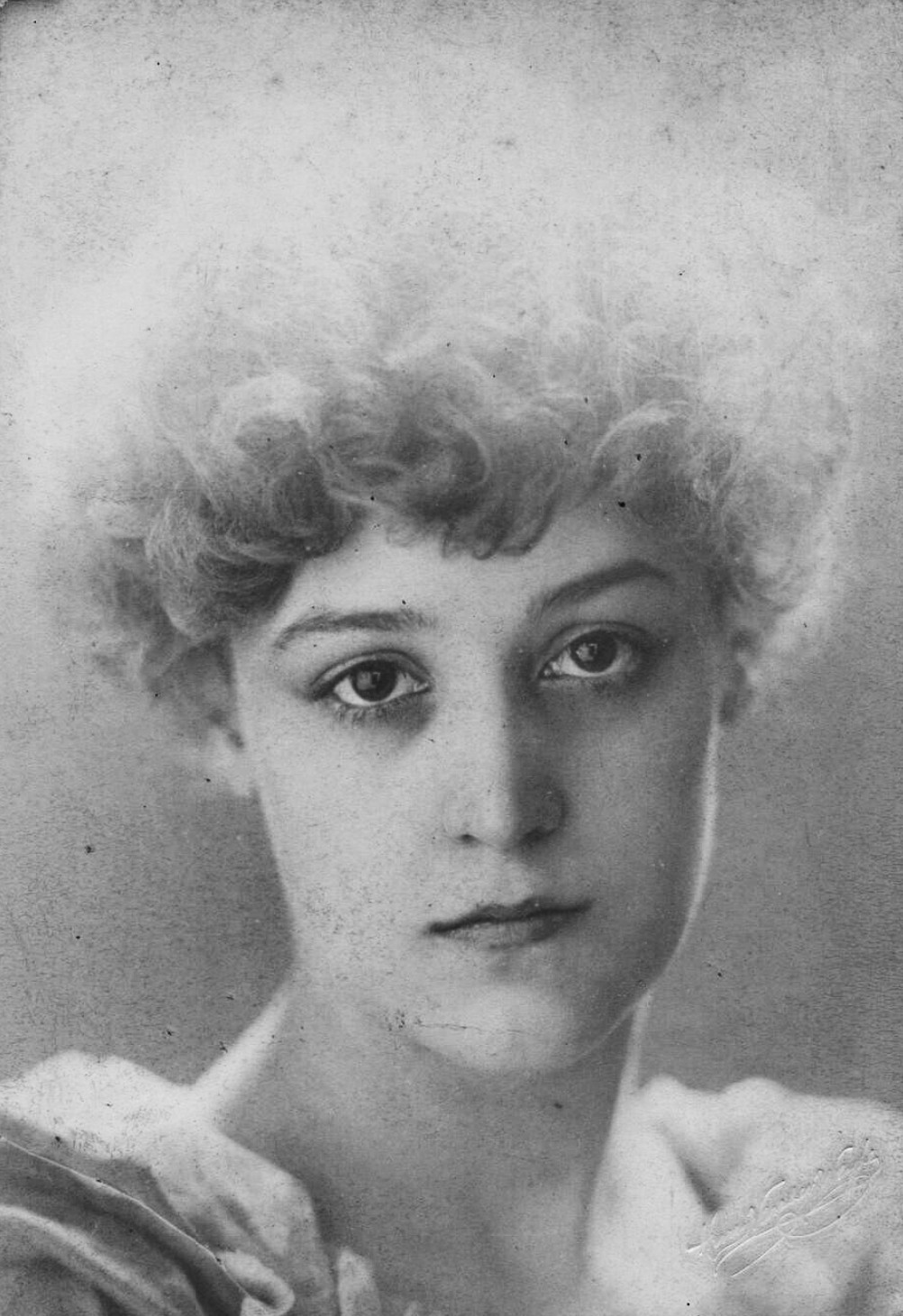
Dorothy Dene in the 1880s

While the body of the woman remains a mystery, there is speculation that the face is that of either of Leighton's two favourite models in the 1890s, Dorothy Dene or Mary Lloyd.

Mary Lloyd was the daughter of an impoverished country squire. She came to London and established a highly successful career as an artist's model, posing only for the head and hands, and not nude – an important distinction. She started posing for Leighton in about 1893, was requested to come to pose in January 1895 for Leighton's Lachrymae (1894–1895). She is probably also the model for his 'Twixt Hope and Fear (c. 1895).

== Bibliography ==
- Barringer, Tim & Prettejohn, Elizabeth, Frederic Leighton: Antiquity, Renaissance, Modernity (Paul Mellon Center for Studies in British Art), Yale University Press (1999). ISBN 978-0-300-07937-1
- Barrington, Russel, The Life, Letters and Work of Frederic Leighton, 2 Voll., BiblioBazaar (2010). ISBN 978-1-143-23340-1
- Weidinger, Alfred, Magnificent Extravagance – Frederic, Lord Leighton's Flaming June 1894–95. Sleeping Beauty. Masterpieces of Victorian Painting from Museo de Arte de Ponce. Edited by Agnes Husslein-Arco and Alfred Weidinger. Belvedere, Vienna 2010. ISBN 978-3-901508-84-4
