= U21 =

U21 or U-21 may refer to:

== Naval vessels ==
- German submarine U-21, various vessels
- INS Jamuna (U21), a sloop of the Indian Navy
- SM U-21 (Austria-Hungary), a submarine of the Austro-Hungarian Navy

== Other uses ==
- Beechcraft U-21 Ute, an American utility aircraft
- Great rhombihexahedron
- Small nucleolar RNA SNORD21
- Universitas 21, an international network of research-intensive universities
- Uppland Runic Inscription 21
