= Beechcraft L-23 Seminole =

American military utility aircraft

L-23/U-8 Seminole
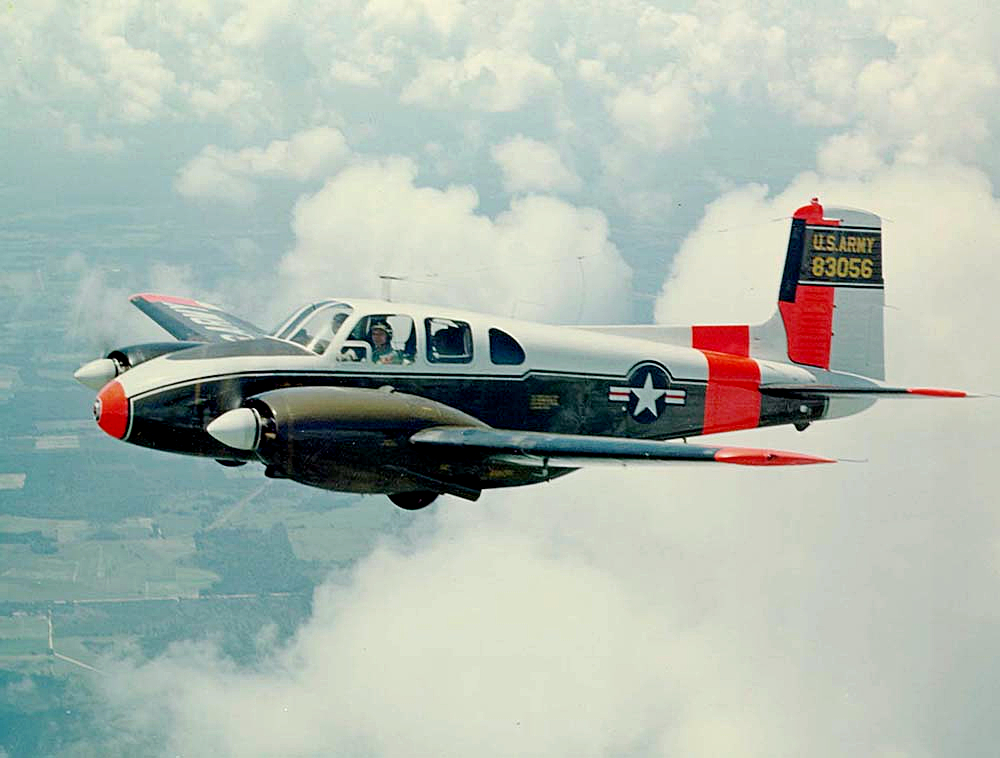
- US Army U-8D Seminole liaison version

General information
- Type: Utility aircraft
- Manufacturer: Beech Aircraft Corporation
- Primary users: United States Army Pakistan Army
- Number built: 288 (including 71 L-23F/U-8F)

History
- Manufactured: 1952-1961 (L-23A/E); 1958-1963 (L-23F/U-8F)
- Introduction date: 1952
- First flight: 1949
- Retired: 1992
- Developed from: Beechcraft Twin Bonanza
- Variant: Beechcraft Queen Air

The Beechcraft L-23 Seminole (later designated U-8) was the United States Armed Forces designation for the Beechcraft Twin Bonanza and Queen Air aircraft in its inventory.

== Design and development ==
In 1951 the United States Army evaluated a Model 50 Twin Bonanza at Fort Bragg, North Carolina and subsequently ordered four off-the-shelf Model 50s as YL-23s, these being delivered in early 1952. Further examples of the Model 50 were ordered under the designation L-23A and Model B50s were also ordered under the designation L-23B. These accounted for the majority of Twin Bonanza production during 1952 and 1953, the first L-23A being delivered in February 1953 and the last L-23B being delivered in April the following year, shortly before the end of the Korean War.

In 1955 the United States Air Force ordered a single Model C50 Twin Bonanza under the designation XL-23C for evaluation; this was the only L-23 variant not delivered to the US Army as no further orders were placed by the Air Force. In 1956 deliveries of L-23s to the Army recommenced when Beechcraft delivered six Model D50s under the designation L-23E. In January 1957 the first example of the L-23D was delivered, based on the Model E50 Twin Bonanza.

During 1958 the remaining L-23A and L-23B aircraft in service (a few had crashed) were returned to the Beechcraft factory, where they were remanufactured to a similar standard as new-build L-23Ds and then re-designated as such with new constructor's numbers and military serial numbers. In 1958 the Army also ordered 11 RL-23Ds with further examples being converted from L-23Ds. These aircraft featured belly-mounted radar, either AN/APS-85 in a large pod or AN/APQ-86 in a long narrow pod mounted on brackets with a modified nose as well.

Also in 1958 Beechcraft began to develop a variant with a larger cabin at the request of the US Army. The L-23F that emerged had the same wings and tail but up to ten people could now fit in the longer, wider and higher cabin compared to only five in earlier L-23s. Beechcraft gave the type the in-house designation of Model 65 and developed it as a civilian aircraft as well, christening it the "Queen Air". The first two Model 65s built were retained by Beechcraft as prototypes and the third was delivered to the Army in 1960, with a further 23 being delivered that year and in 1961.

== Operational history ==
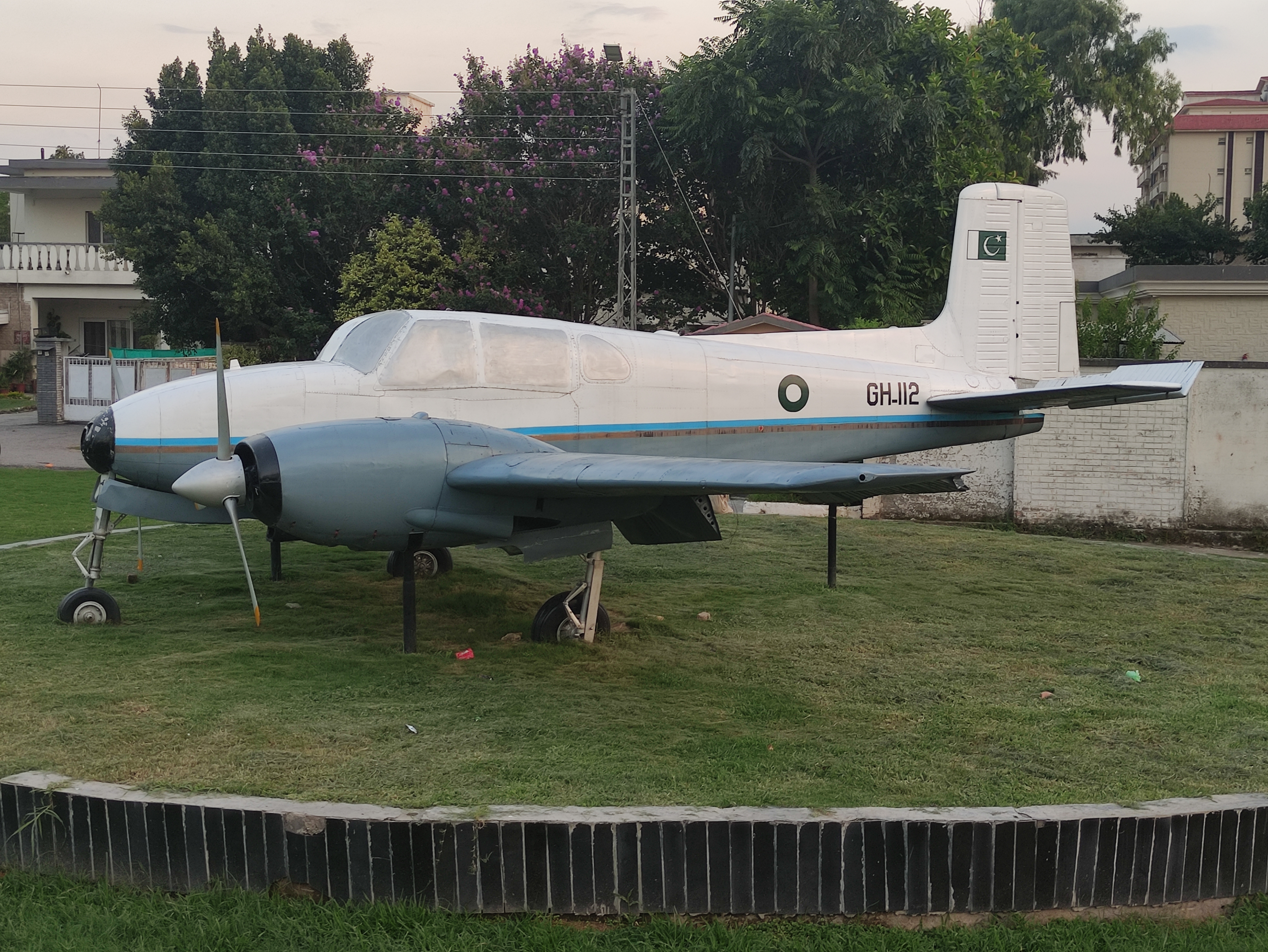
A Pakistani Beechcraft L-23 Seminole (S. No. GH-112) on display at Rawalpindi

The first L-23As entered service in 1953 and the type served the US Army for almost forty years, the last U-8Fs being retired in 1992. When US military aircraft designations were revised in 1962, the remaining L-23D, RL-23D, L-23E and L-23F aircraft became U-8Ds, RU-8Ds, U-8Es and U-8Fs. A further 47 Model 65s were ordered in 1962 and 1963 as U-8Fs; one of these was delivered to the Pakistan Army, formally the only L-23 or U-8 delivery to a foreign user (although other nations bought Queen Airs off-the-shelf as military aircraft). These were the final new-build aircraft in the series, however the unique Beechcraft Model 87 turboprop proof-of-concept aircraft used in developing the King Air was delivered to the Army as the NU-8F in 1964 (this was later re-designated the YU-21) and a few used Queen Airs were also taken by the Army.

Many U-8Fs were modified during their service lives to a similar standard as civilian Excalibur Queen Airs. The most obvious modifications are more powerful Lycoming IO-720 eight-cylinder engines in place of the factory-fitted six-cylinder engines; and bulged main landing gear doors that fully enclose the wheels when the gear is retracted instead of the wheels partially protruding through the doors. Many L-23Ds/U-8Ds and U-8Fs have been registered as civilian aircraft since retirement from military service.

== Variants ==
YL-23
Four Model 50 Twin Bonanzas evaluated by the US Army subsequently converted to L-23A standard.

L-23A
55 delivered to the US Army, many subsequently converted to L-23D standard.

L-23B
Based on B50. 40 delivered to the US Army from 1954, with many subsequently converted to L-23D standard.

XL-23C
One aircraft based C50 for evaluation by the US Air Force.

L-23D
100 delivered new to the US Army plus 93 L-23As and Bs rebuilt to L-23D standard.

RL-23D
variant with belly-mounted radar. Eleven new-build aircraft delivered to the US Army, plus 29 converted from L-23Ds.

L-23E
Six delivered to the United States Army.

L-23F
24 aircraft based on the Beechcraft Queen Air delivered to the US Army.

U-8D
L-23D redesignated in 1962.

RU-8D
RL-23D redesignated in 1962, plus 15 U-8Ds converted after 1962.

U-8E
L-23E redesignated in 1962.

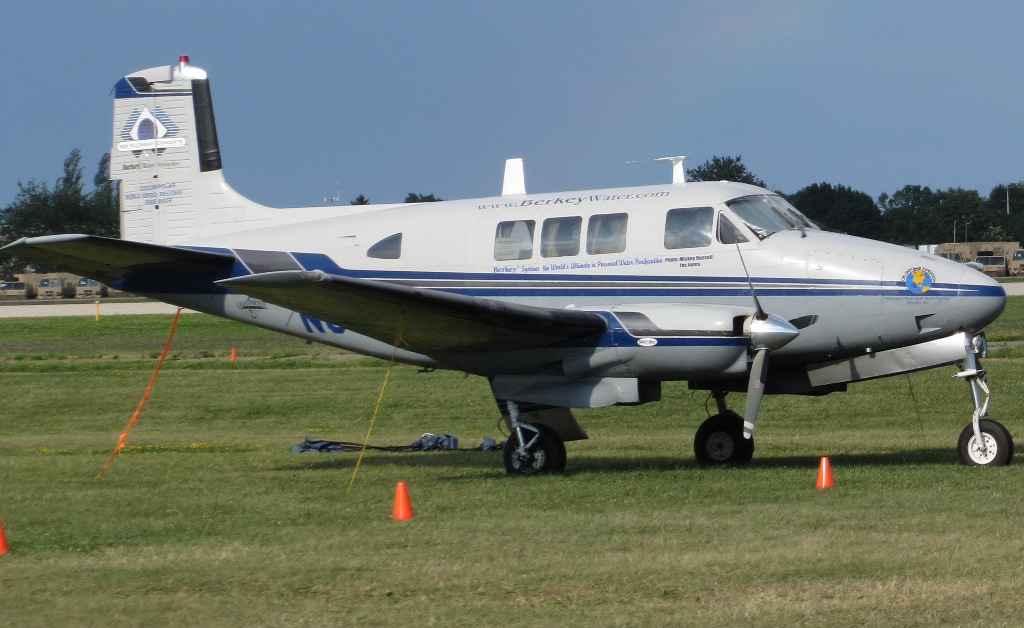
Beechcraft U-8F

U-8F
L-23F redesignated in 1962 and 46 new-build aircraft delivered to the US Army, plus single Beechcraft Model 87 delivered used as NU-8F in 1964 and one Queen Air purchased second-hand in 1966. In addition, one U-8F was delivered to the Pakistan Army instead of the US Army and two Queen Airs confiscated from drug runners were added to the US Army inventory in 1981 as U-8Fs.

NU-8F
US military designation assigned to a modified commercial Queen Air converted as the prototype Model 65-90 King Air, and fitted with two 500 shp Pratt & Whitney PT6A-6 turboprop engines. The aircraft was evaluated by the US Army in 1964.

U-8G
XL-23C, seven U-8Ds and four U-8Es modified with more powerful engines and enlarged cabin for six passengers.

== Military operators ==
Pakistan

- Pakistan Army

United States

- United States Army

== Aircraft on display ==
- 56-3701 – U-8D on static display at the Pima Air & Space Museum in Tucson, Arizona.
- 58-1358 – RU-8D on static display at the Combat Air Museum in Topeka, Kansas.
- 58-3051 – U-8D on static display at the U.S. Army Transportation Museum at Joint Base Langley–Eustis near Newport News, Virginia.
- 59-4991 – RU-8D on static display at the National Vigilance Park at Fort Meade, Maryland. This airframe was previously on display at the U.S. Army Transportation Museum.
- 62-3838 – U-8F on static display at the Kansas Aviation Museum in Wichita, Kansas.

== Specifications (L-23D) ==
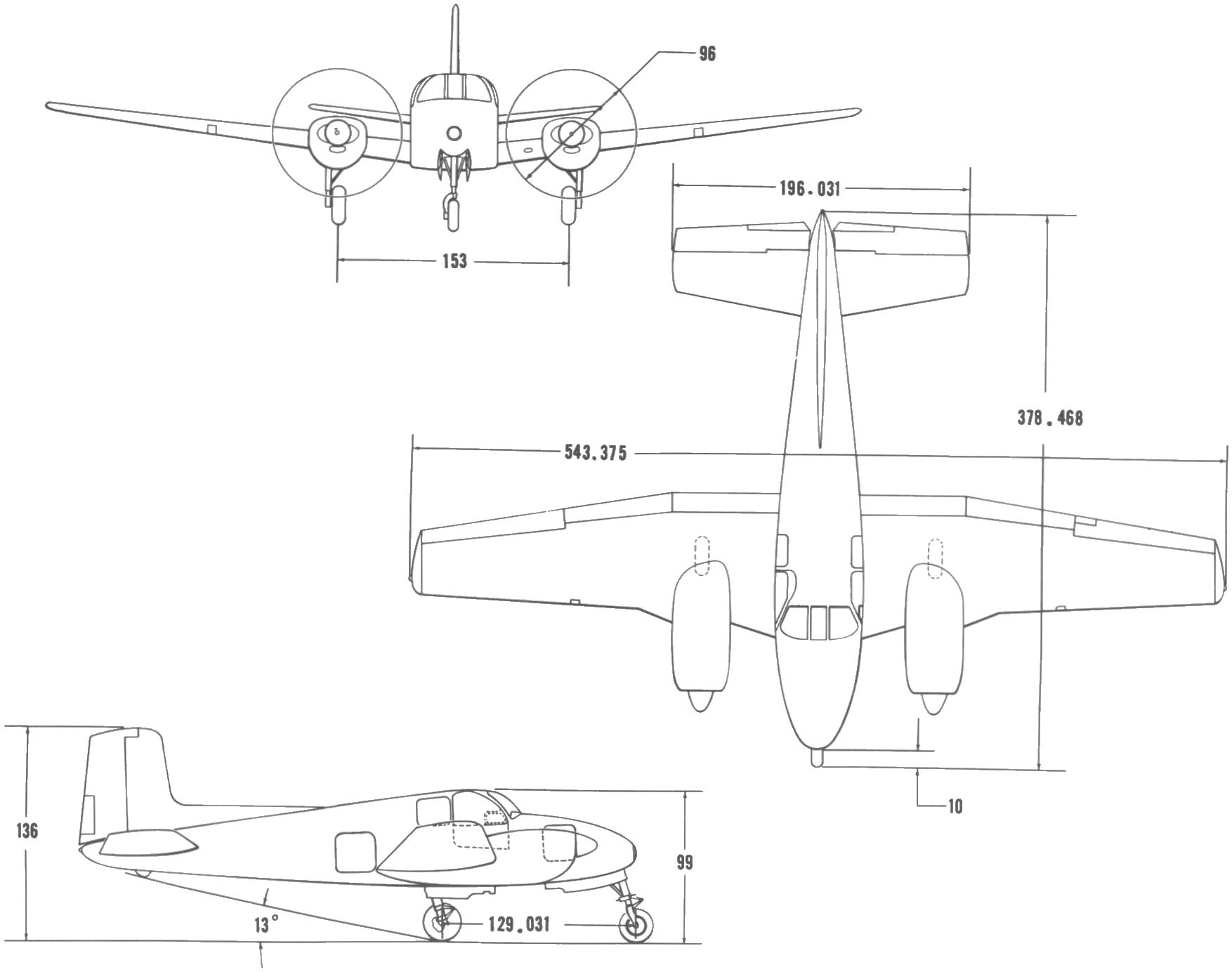
3-view line drawing of the Beechcraft L-23A Seminole

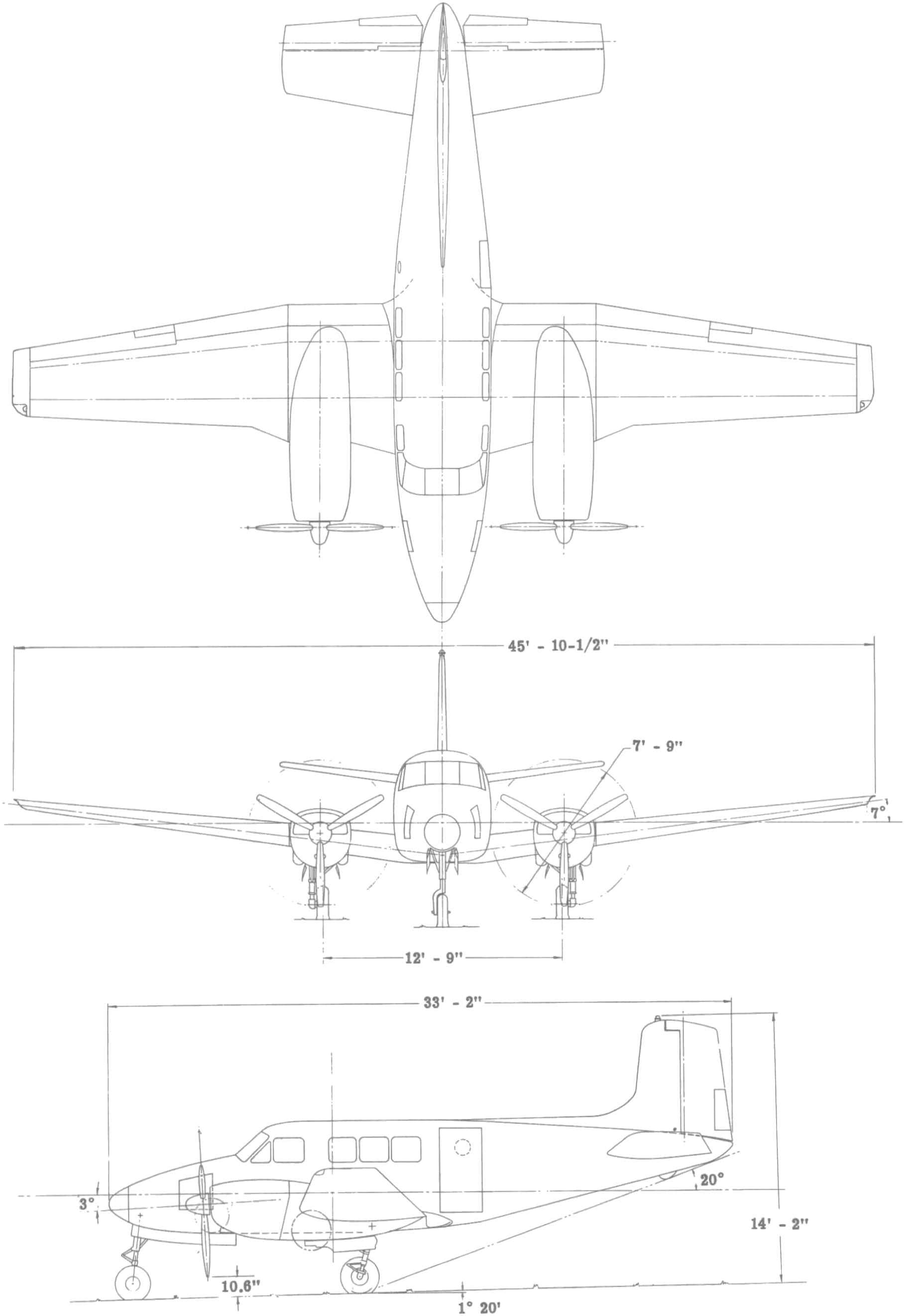
3-view line drawing of the Beechcraft L-23F Seminole

Data from U.S. Army Aircraft Since 1947

General characteristics

- Crew: 2
- Capacity: 6 passengers
- Length: 31 ft 6 in (9.60 m)
- Wingspan: 45 ft 3 in (13.79 m)
- Height: 11 ft 6 in (3.51 m)
- Wing area: 277 sq ft (25.7 m^{2})
- Empty weight: 4,970 lb (2,254 kg)
- Max takeoff weight: 7,300 lb (3,311 kg)
- Fuel capacity: 180 US gal (150 imp gal; 680 L)
- Powerplant: 2 × Lycoming GSO-480-A1A6 (Military designation O-480-1) , 340 hp (250 kW) each

Performance

- Maximum speed: 233 mph (375 km/h, 202 kn)
- Cruise speed: 180 mph (290 km/h, 160 kn)
- Range: 1,350–1,470 mi (2,170–2,370 km, 1,170–1,280 nmi)
- Service ceiling: 27,000 ft (8,200 m)

== See also ==
Related development

- Beechcraft Twin Bonanza

Related lists

- List of military aircraft of the United States
