= Beechcraft Queen Air =

1958 twin-piston-engine utility aircraft family

Queen Air
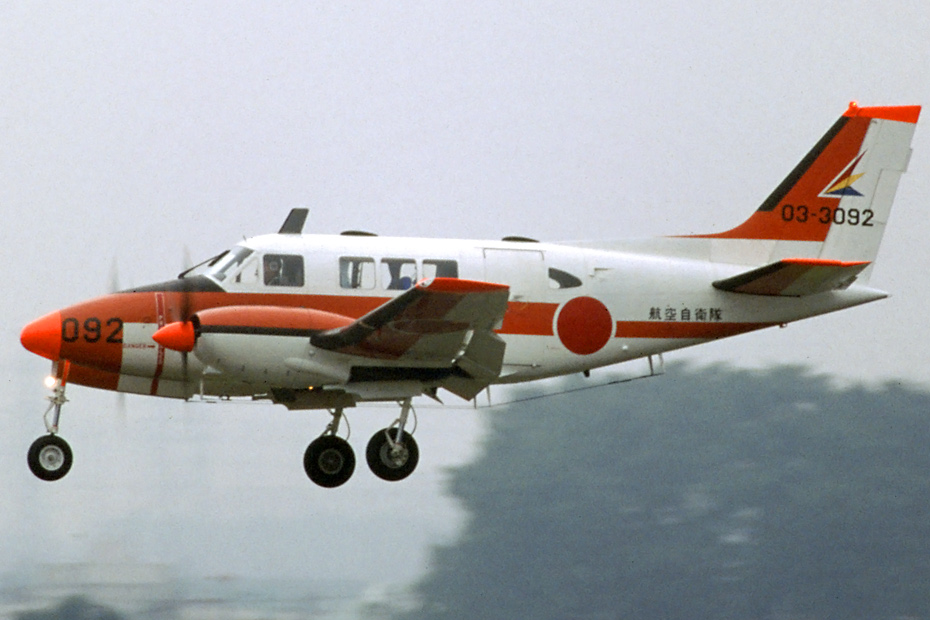
- Japan Air Self-Defense Force A65-8200 in 1994

General information
- Type: Utility aircraft Airliner
- Manufacturer: Beech Aircraft Corporation
- Designer: Beech Aircraft Corporation
- Status: In service
- Number built: 1,005

History
- Manufactured: 1960-1978
- Introduction date: 1960
- First flight: August 28, 1958
- Developed from: Beechcraft Twin Bonanza
- Developed into: Beechcraft U-21 Ute; Beechcraft King Air; Beechcraft Model 99

The Beechcraft Queen Air is a twin-engined light aircraft produced by Beechcraft in numerous versions from 1960 to 1978. Based upon the Twin Bonanza, with which it shared key components such as wings, engines, and tail surfaces, it had a larger fuselage, and served as the basis for the highly successful King Air series of turboprop aircraft. Its primary uses have been as a private aircraft, utility, and small commuter airliner. Production ran for 17 years.

== Design and development ==
With the company's popular Twin Bonanza reaching its limits of development, Beechcraft decided to develop a design based on it but with a larger fuselage and new tail. The result was the Beech 65, the first of the Queen Air series, a twin-engined nine-seat low-wing cantilever cabin monoplane with retractable tricycle landing gear. It was initially powered by two 340 hp (250 kW) Lycoming IGSO-480 six-cylinder, horizontally opposed piston engines.

Early in development the United States Army, which had been a customer of the Twin Bonanza (designated the L-23 Seminole), ordered 68 aircraft under the designation L-23F. The prototype Beech 65 first flew on August 28, 1958, with the production model receiving a Federal Aviation Authority type certificate on February 4, 1959; initial deliveries were made soon after. On February 8, 1960, a Queen Air achieved a new height record of 34,862 feet.

The basic Model 65 was in production until 1967, overlapped by the introduction of other variants, and was followed by improved Model A65 with a swept rather than vertical tail. Variants introduced a longer wing in some models, as well as pressurization in one. The Queen Air series ended in 1978.

== Variants ==
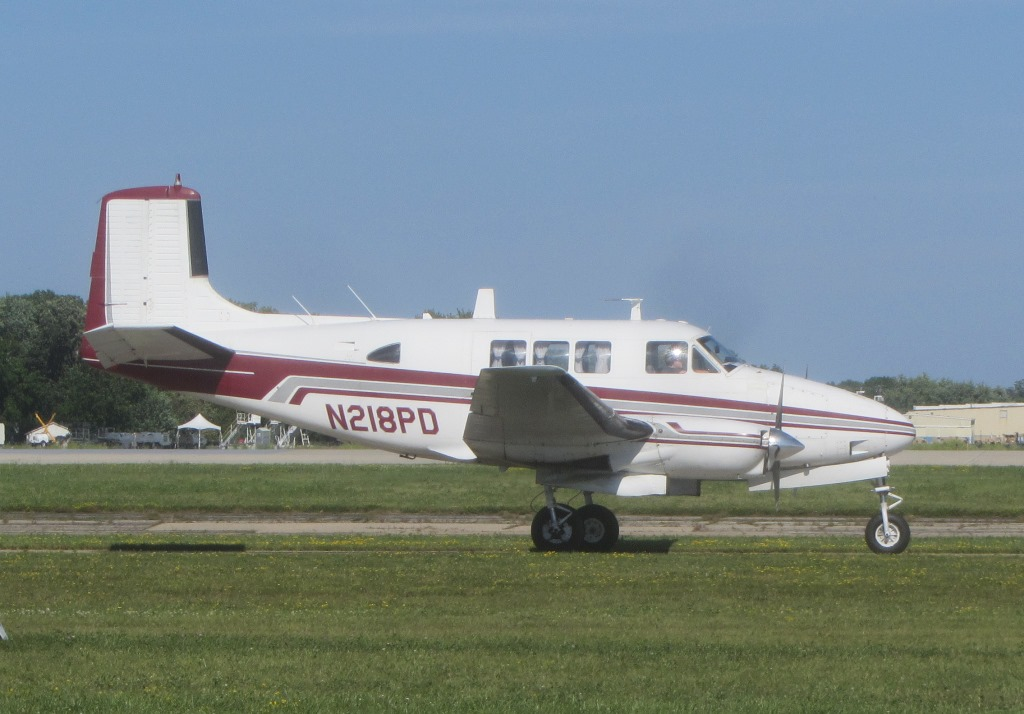
Beechcraft Model 65 Queen Air

=== 65 ===
This is the initial version of the Queen Air, powered by two 340 hp (250 kW) Lycoming IGSO-480s. Fitted with short span (45 feet 10 1/2 inches (13.98 m)) wings and a straight unswept tail. It had a gross weight of 7,700 lb (3,500 kg). Usually referred to as a "straight 65". 316 built from 1959 to 1967.

=== A65 ===
First produced in 1967, the A65 is very similar to the straight 65. The major change was the addition of a swept tail with a dorsal fin. Available fuel was also increased, with a maximum capacity of 264 US gal (220 imp gal; 1,000 L) when auxiliary tanks are fitted. A dedicated airliner version, the A65-8200 Queen Airliner was available with an increased gross weight of 8,200 lb (3,700 kg). A total of 96 A65s were built between 1967 and 1970.

=== 70 ===
Introduced in 1968, the 70 is essentially an A65 with the B80 wing. This allows the 70 to have a greater lifting ability than the 65 but a lower fuel burn and operating cost than the 80. It. Its gross weight is 8,200 lb (3,700 kg). A total of 35 were built between 1969 and 1971.

=== 80 ===
The 80 (also known as the Model 65-80) was the first of the Queen Airs to have the swept tail, although it retained the short wings of the Model 65. First flown on June 22, 1961, and certified on February 20, 1962, it was powered by 380 hp (280 kW) Lycoming IGSO-540 and had a gross weight of 8,000 lb (3,600 kg). 148 built from 1962 to 1963.

=== A80 ===
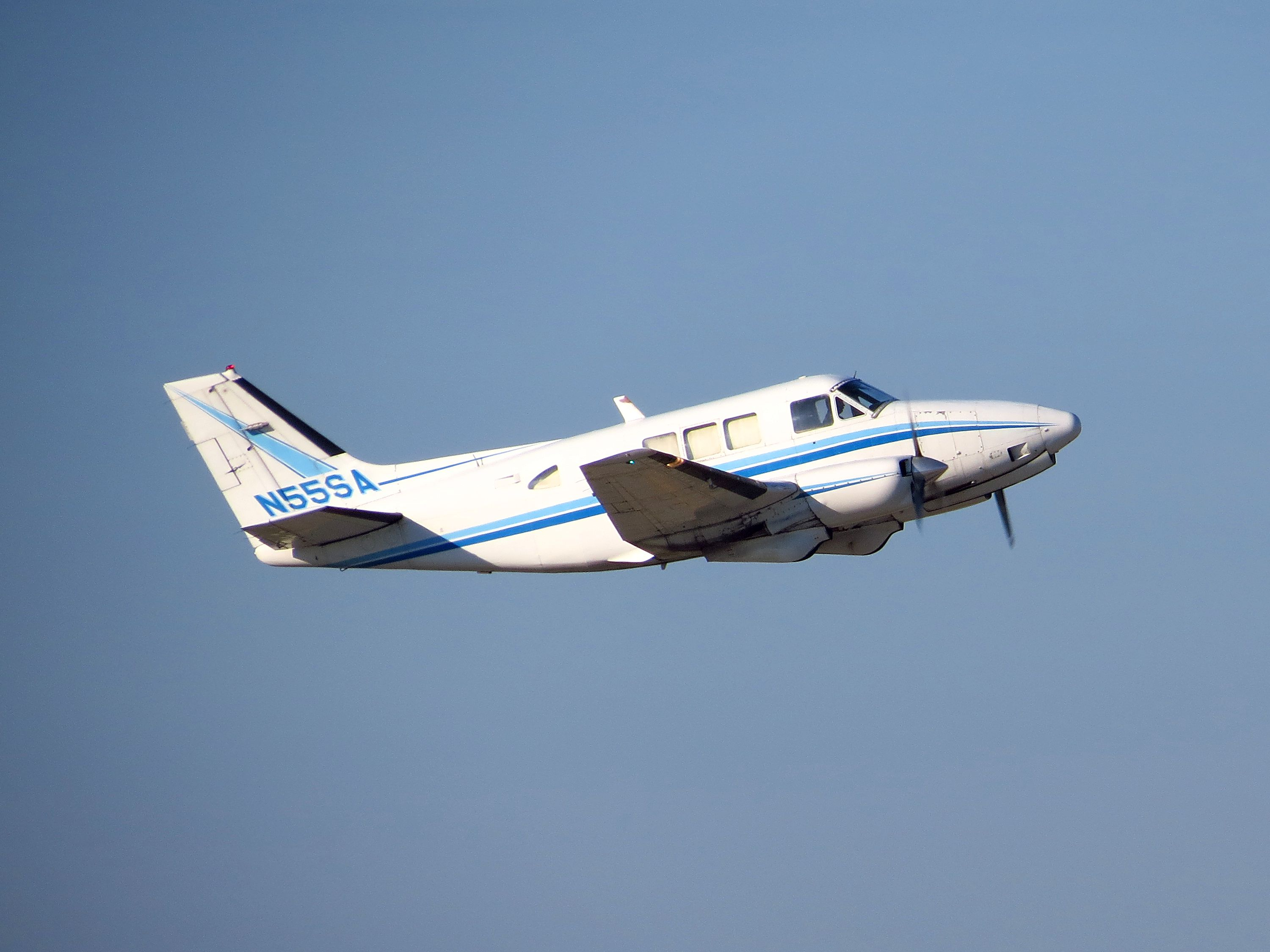
Bemidji Airlines Beech 65-A80

The A80 (also known as the Model 65-A80) was introduced in 1964 with a new, longer wing, increasing wingspan from 45 feet 10 1/2 inches (13.98 m) to 50 feet 3 inches (15.32 m). Other major changes included a redesign of the aircraft nose, an increase in fuel capacity, and a 500-pound increase in takeoff weight to 8,500 lb (3,900 kg) gross. 121 built between 1964 and 1966.

=== B80 ===
Introduced in 1966, the B80 became the final Queen Air and had by far the longest production run in the series, some 12 years. Available with either 380 hp Lycoming IGSO-540-A1A or 360 hp (270 kW) Lycoming IGSO-540-A1D engines, its major improvement was the increased gross weight to a 8,800 lb (4,000 kg). 242 built from 1966 to 1977.

=== 85D ===
A single Model 85D was built with construction number LN-1. It later became the prototype for the Model 65-88.

=== 88 ===
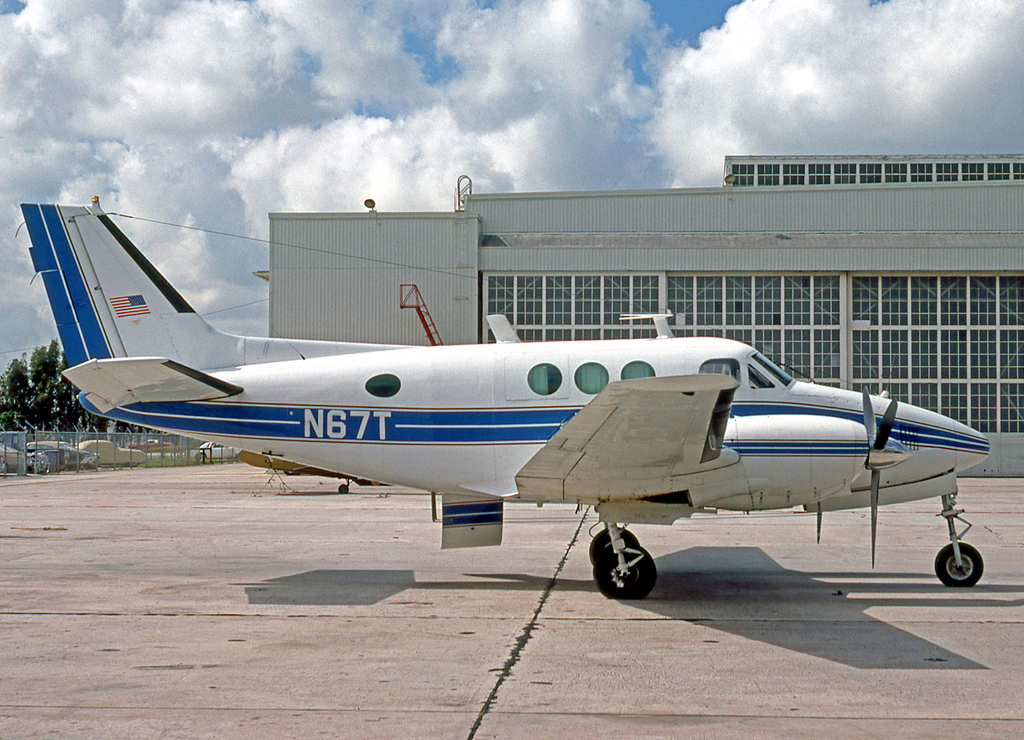
A pressurized Model 88 Queen Air built in 1966, with the model's distinctive circular fuselage windows

First flown on 2 July 1965, the Model 88 was introduced later that year. The only pressurized Queen Air, it shares the engines and long wing of the B80. Sales were slack due to its higher sales price and lower useful load as compared to the B80, and ended in 1969. Only 47 examples were produced, of which two were converted to King Air standard.

Its round cabin windows make the 88 look quite similar to a 90 series King Air. The first two models of the King Air's official designation were 65-90 and 65-A90 owing to its Queen Air heritage.

=== Excalibur ===
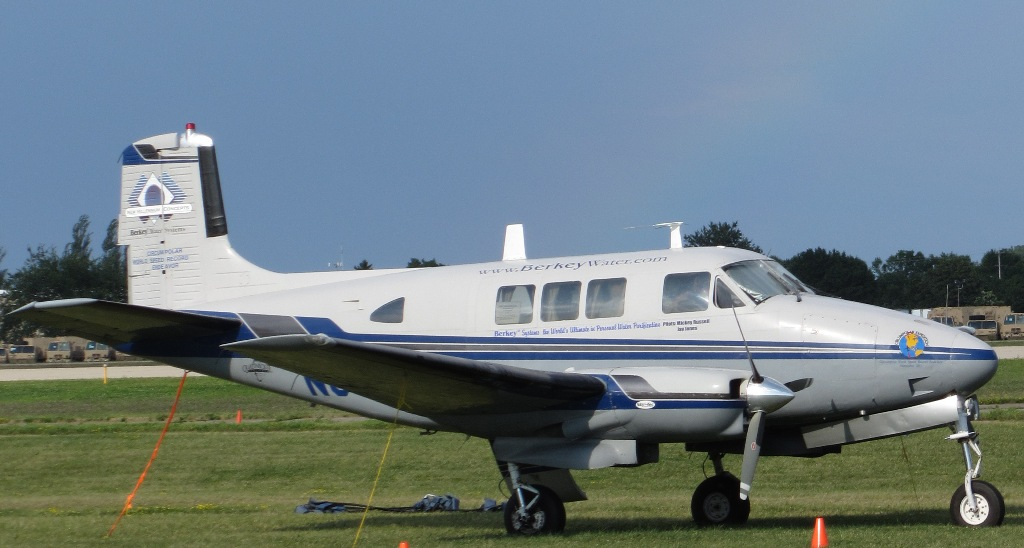
Queen Air 65 Excalibur conversion prior to a 2011 round-the-world attempt

The Excalibur is an up-engined aftermarket modification to the 65 performed by supplemental type certificates (STC). It replaced the six-cylinder Lycoming IGSO-480 and Lycoming IGSO-540 with the far more robust eight-cylinder 400 hp (300 kW) Lycoming IO-720. This eliminated the need for a gearbox or superchargers and their associated maintenance and potential reliability problems, at the expense of being limited to a cruising altitude below fifteen thousand feet. Gross weights increased to 8,000 lb (3,600 kg) for all short-wing aircraft (65, A65, 80), 8,200 lb (3,700 kg) for the 70, and 8800 for the other long-wing aircraft (A80, B80, 88). The US Army National Guard installed this modification on some of their aircraft. The Excalibur can be recognized by the noticeably smaller engine cowlings and lower-set engines. It was originally designed and produced by Ed Swearingen, who was well known for his work on the Twin Bonanza, Queen Air, and later Merlin and Metro Swearingen aircraft. The ownership of the pictured aircraft changed hands many times over the years, and was Bemidji Aviation, an operator of Excalibur Queen Airs as well as other charter and freight aircraft in the upper mid-west of the United States, at the time of the photo in 2011.

=== Military variants ===
L-23F
24 aircraft based on the Beechcraft Queen Air delivered to the US Army.
U-8F
L-23F redesignated in 1962 and 46 new-build aircraft delivered to the US Army, plus single Beechcraft Model 87 delivered used as NU-8F in 1964 and one Queen Air purchased second-hand in 1966. In addition, one U-8F was delivered to the Pakistan Army instead of the US Army and two Queen Airs confiscated from drug runners were added to the US Army inventory in 1981 as U-8Fs.
NU-8F
US military designation assigned to a modified commercial Queen Air converted as the prototype Model 65-90 King Air, and fitted with two 500 shp Pratt & Whitney PT6A-6 turboprop engines. The aircraft was evaluated by the US Army in 1964.
C-8
Brazilian Air Force designation for the Model B80. Originally designated U-8.
EU-8
Brazilian Air Force designation for "electronics" variant of the Model B80.
B.PhTh.2
(Thai: บ.ผท.๒) Royal Thai Armed Forces designation for the Model B80.
B.PhTh.2A
(Thai: บ.ผท.๒ก) Royal Thai Armed Forces designation for the Model A80.

=== Production numbers ===
Production numbers of Beechcraft Queen Airs by variant:

- 65 and A65 - 411 (including military production)
- 70 - 35
- 80, A80, B80 - 511
- 85D - 1
- 88 - 47
- Total - 1,005

== Military operators ==
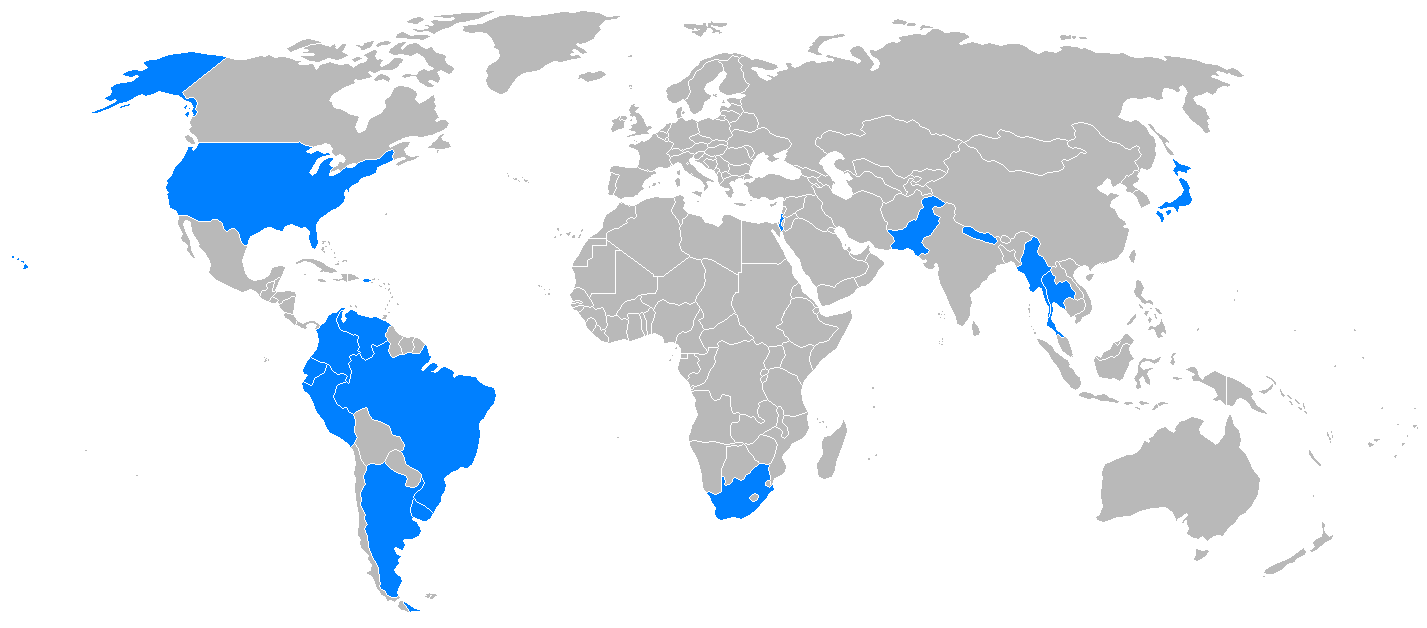
Military Queen Air operators

Algeria
Algerian Air Force - 3 B80s in service as of 1986.
Argentina
Argentine Army Aviation
Argentine Naval Aviation - 5 B80s as of 1986.
Argentine National Gendarmerie - At least one aircraft confiscated from drug smugglers operated in late 1990s
Brazil
Eight aircraft received,
Burma
One Queen Air operated.
Colombia
Colombian Air Force
Dominican Republic
Air Force of the Dominican Republic
Ecuador
Ecuadorian Army
India
Border Security Force
Israel
Israeli Air Force - Seven B80s received.
(Haiti)
Haiti Air Corps
Japan
Japan Air Self-Defense Force

Central Air Command Support Squadron

Japan Maritime Self Defense Force
Nepal - One Model 80
Pakistan
Peru

- Peruvian Air Force acquired 18 Queen Airs in 1965–1966.
- Peruvian Army

Philippines
Philippine Army - 1 unit PA-701 LD-149 Model Be.65-80 retired at Fort Magsaysay, Nueva Ecija.
South Africa
South African Air Force 1975-1992
Thailand
Royal Thai Air Force
United States
United States Army
Uruguay
Uruguayan Air Force
Venezuela
Venezuelan Air Force - Two Model 65s and seven A80s.
Venezuelan Army
Venezuelan National Guard

== Specifications (Queen Air B80) ==
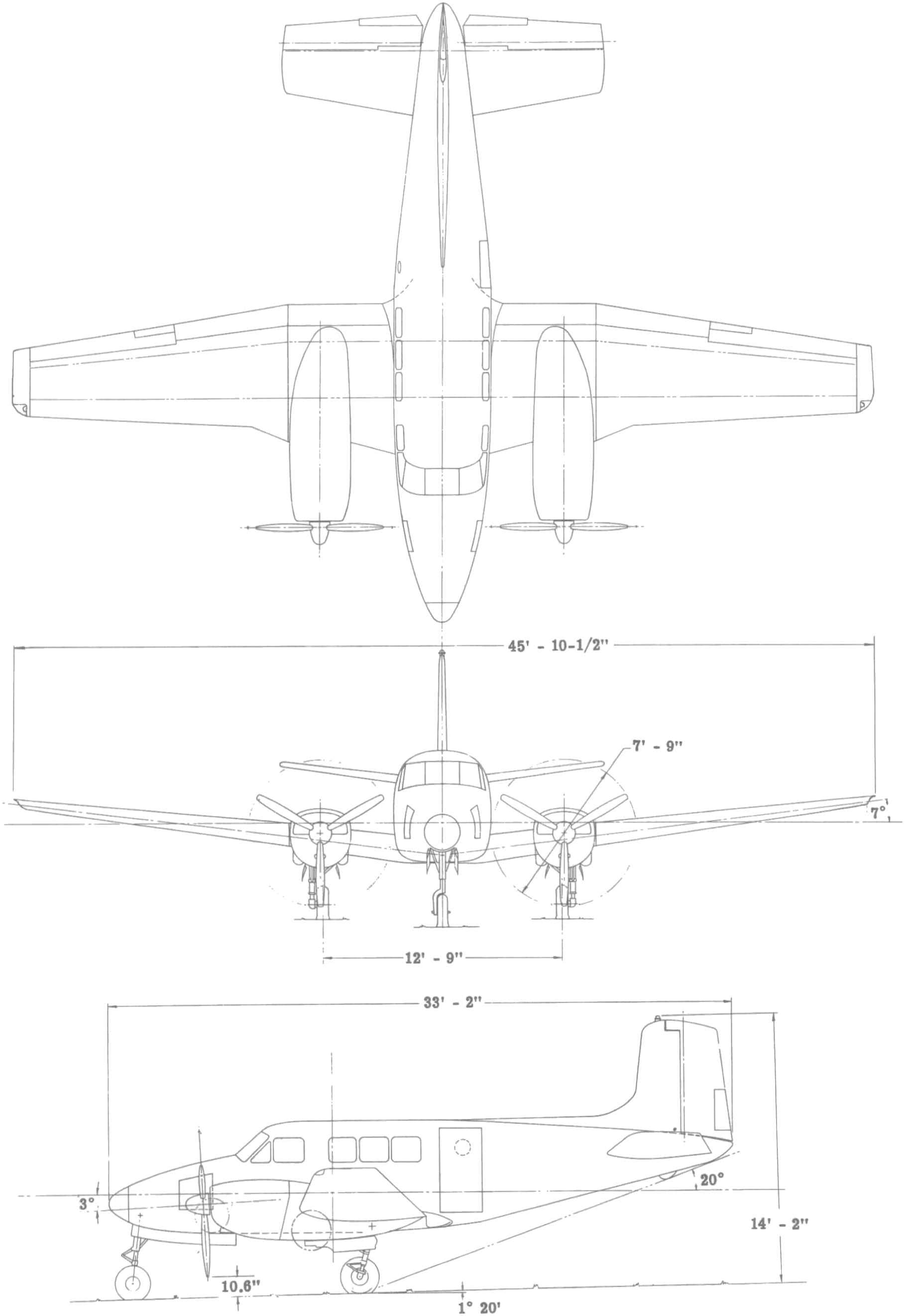
3-view line drawing of the Beechcraft L-23F Seminole

Data from Janes's All The World's Aircraft 1976-77.

General characteristics

- Crew: 1–2
- Capacity: 4–9 passengers
- Length: 35 ft 6 in (10.82 m)
- Wingspan: 50 ft 3 in (15.32 m)
- Height: 14 ft 2 1/2 in (4.331 m)
- Wing area: 293.9 sq ft (27.30 m^{2})
- Airfoil: NACA 23020 at root, NACA 23012 at tip
- Empty weight: 5,277 lb (2,394 kg)
- Max takeoff weight: 8,800 lb (3,992 kg)
- Fuel capacity: 214 US gal (178 imp gal; 810 L) normal, 264 US gal (220 imp gal; 1,000 L) with optional auxiliary tanks
- Powerplant: 2 × Lycoming IGSO-540 A1D supercharged, air-cooled flat-6 engines, 380 hp (280 kW) each
- Propellers: 3-bladed Hartzell constant speed

Performance

- Maximum speed: 215 kn (247 mph, 398 km/h) at 11,500 ft (3,500 m)
- Cruise speed: 159 kn (183 mph, 294 km/h) at 15,000 ft (4,600 m), 45% power (econ cruise)
- Stall speed: 71 kn (82 mph, 131 km/h) wheels and flaps down, IAS
- Range: 1,317 nmi (1,516 mi, 2,439 km) at 15,000 ft (4,600 m), 45% power
- Service ceiling: 26,800 ft (8,200 m)
- Rate of climb: 1,275 ft/min (6.48 m/s)
- Takeoff distance to 50 ft (15m): 2,556 ft (779 m)
- Landing distance from 50 ft (15m): 2,572 ft (784 m)

== See also ==
Related development

- Beechcraft Twin Bonanza
- Beechcraft U-21 Ute
- Beechcraft King Air

Aircraft of comparable role, configuration, and era

- Cessna 404 Titan
