= Beechcraft Twin Bonanza =

Twin-piston-engine utility aircraft built 1951–1961

Model 50 Twin Bonanza
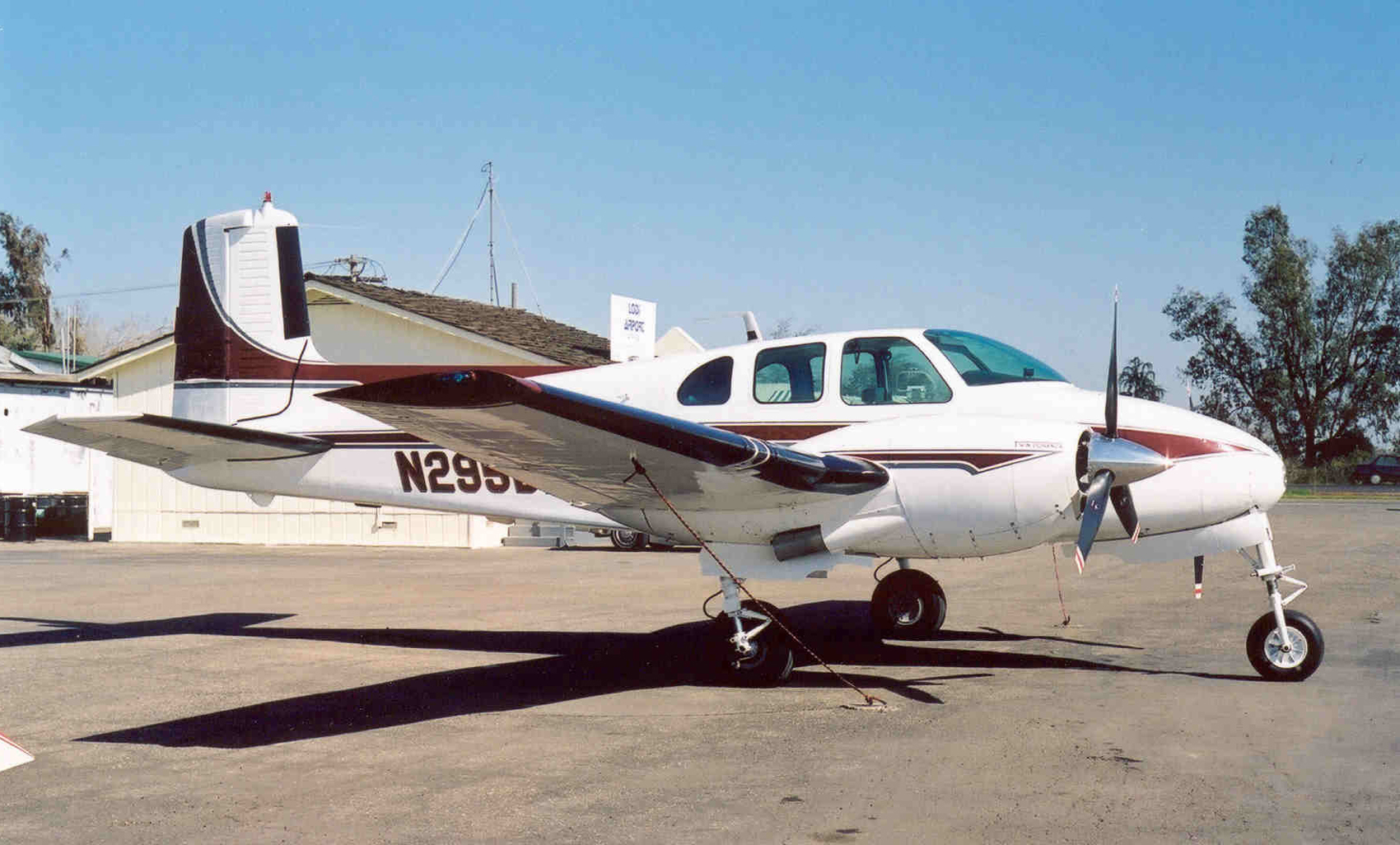
- Beech D50 Twin Bonanza

General information
- Type: Utility aircraft
- Manufacturer: Beech Aircraft Corporation
- Status: Active
- Primary user: Private operators
- Number built: 975 (includes 195 L-23)

History
- Manufactured: 1951–1961
- Introduction date: 1951
- First flight: November 15, 1949
- Variant: Beechcraft L-23/U-8 Seminole
- Developed into: Beechcraft Queen Air

The Beechcraft Model 50 Twin Bonanza is a small twin-engined aircraft designed by Beechcraft as an executive transport for the business market. It was developed to fill a gap in Beechcraft's product line between the single-engined Model 35 Bonanza and the larger Model 18. The Twin Bonanza is dissimilar to the Bonanza, being much larger and heavier and using more powerful engines, while in its earliest form having only half the passenger capacity of the Model 18.

== Development ==
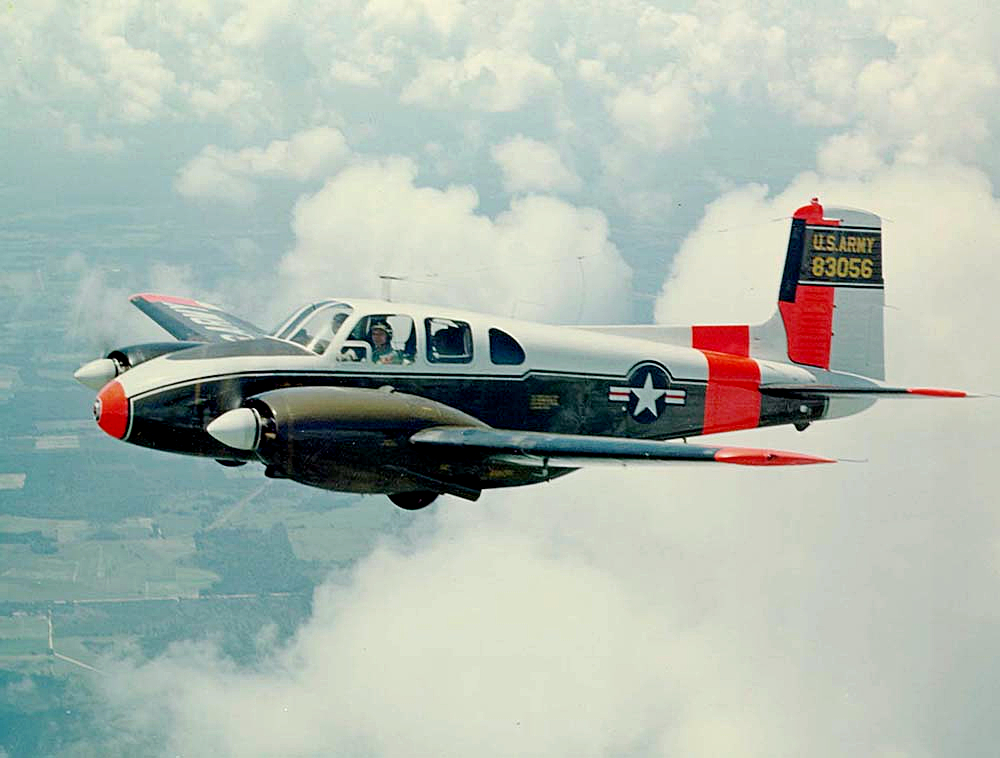
The military version of the Twin Bonanza, The L-23 Seminole.

The Twin Bonanza was first flown on November 15, 1949, after rapid development, begun only in April of that year. The aircraft was first designed to use Franklin engines with superchargers, but the engine company owner, Preston Tucker, diverted all of its aviation resources to support his ill-fated Tucker 48 automobile project. The aircraft was hastily modified to accept the Lycoming GO-435, but the engine nacelles were not redesigned to fit the smaller Lycoming, creating unusually generous internal clearances that facilitate engine maintenance. The Model 50's type certificate was awarded in 1951, and production began the same year. The Twin Bonanza is one of only a few light twin-engined civil aircraft certificated in the utility category, and was the first production light aircraft to feature shoulder belts.

Despite its name, the Twin Bonanza is a substantially larger and heavier aircraft that is mostly dissimilar to the single-engined Bonanza; the only major shared parts are the front fuselage sides and windows, and on early models, the main cabin door. The Twin Bonanza fuselage is 12 in (30 cm) wider than that of the Bonanza.

The United States Army adopted the Twin Bonanza as the L-23 Seminole utility transport, making it the largest fixed-wing aircraft in its inventory at that time. According to Ralph Harmon, the airplane's designer, during an initial demonstration flight for the Army, Beechcraft test pilot Claude Palmer crashed while trying to land over a 50-foot (15 m) tree line with the aircraft full of soldiers and sandbags. Everyone on board walked away from the crash. The Army was impressed with the structural strength of the Twin Bonanza, eventually purchasing 216 of the 994 examples produced. It was also the first twin-engined aircraft in its class to be offered to the business market, but the Korean War was raging in the early 1950s and the US Army took almost the entire production for 1952 and 1953.

The Beechcraft Model 65 Queen Air and Model 90 King Air are both direct descendants of the Model 50 Twin Bonanza. All three aircraft share the same basic wing design, as well as landing gear, flaps, instrument panels, fuel cells, and more. The Queen Air added a larger cabin to the design, while the later King Air added turbine power and pressurization. Twin Bonanza production ended in 1963 while the King Air was under development.

== Design ==
The Twin Bonanza is an all-metal low-wing monoplane with a cantilever wing and retractable tricycle landing gear, initially powered by two wing-mounted geared Lycoming GO-435 piston engines, each with a wooden two-bladed propeller. The standard cabin seats six people on bench seats, three in the front and three in the rear, and several other seating configurations were offered, including club seating and a three-person sideways-facing couch. Early models had a single right-hand door above the wing, accessed by trailing edge steps, while later aircraft added a rear airstair door with retracting steps. The 260 hp (190 kW) GO-435 was replaced by the 275 hp (205 kW) Lycoming GO-480 in 1954; this engine was subsequently upgraded with fuel injection and then superchargers, increasing power to 295 hp (220 kW) in 1956 and 340 hp (250 kW) in 1957.

In addition to its seating configuration, the Twin Bonanza has several other unusual design features. The main landing gear wheels retract only partially into the engine nacelles, leaving the tires exposed to assist in the event of a belly landing and allowing the pilot some directional control using differential braking. The aircraft is equipped with a tailskid to mitigate damage from a badly executed or belly landing. The exposed main wheels and tailskid potentially allow a Twin Bonanza equipped with two-bladed props to be belly-landed with minimal damage if the props are stopped horizontally. In many Twin Bonanzas, the copilot's seat and rudder pedals are not on the right as is customary, but instead are positioned in the center of the front seat; the pilots pivot the single "throwover" control yoke to the center for the copilot to fly. Instead of conventional cowl flaps for low-speed engine cooling, the engines are equipped with exhaust augmenter tubes that create a low-pressure area inside the engine nacelles, drawing in additional cooling air. The combination of the augmenter tubes and low propeller RPM and high engine RPM from the geared engines gives the Twin Bonanza a characteristic sound.

"Junior JATO" rocket motors mounted to the tops of the engine nacelles were briefly offered as a factory option for the Twin Bonanza. Unlike most JATO systems intended to shorten takeoff distance, the Twin Bonanza motors were nominally intended to keep the aircraft aloft during in-flight emergencies or forced landings. However, it is unclear whether this feature was ever installed on a production aircraft or used in any instance other than test flights.

== Operational history ==
The Twin Bonanza had trouble competing with the similarly capable but substantially lighter Cessna 310 and Piper PA-23, so Beechcraft used the basic single-engined Bonanza fuselage and many other Bonanza parts to create the Twin Bonanza's effective replacements: the Travel Air and the closely related Baron. The Twin Bonanza has been plagued by a reputation for slow cruise speed, poor fuel economy and high engine overhaul costs relative to other six to eight-seat light piston twins; this has historically kept resale values low, but many owners praise its reliability, good outwards visibility, stable flying qualities and generous interior space, particularly when the three-wide seats are not fully occupied.

The Twin Bonanza is popularly known as the "Twin Bo" or the "T-Bone".

In January 2012, the Australian Civil Aviation Safety Authority issued an airworthiness directive grounding all Bonanzas, Twin Bonanzas, and Debonairs equipped with a single pole-style yoke, having forward elevator control cables more than 15 years old, until they could be inspected. The AD was issued based on two aircraft found to have frayed cables, one of which suffered a cable failure just prior to takeoff, and resulting concerns about the age of the cables in fleet aircraft of this age. At the time of the grounding, some Bonanzas had reached 64 years in service. Aircraft with frayed cables were grounded until the cables were replaced, and those that passed inspection were required to have their cables replaced within 60 days regardless. The AD affected only Australian aircraft and was not adopted by the airworthiness authority responsible for the type certificate, the US Federal Aviation Administration. The FAA instead opted to issue a Special Airworthiness Information Bulletin (SAIB) requesting that the elevator control cables be inspected during the annual inspection.

== Variants ==
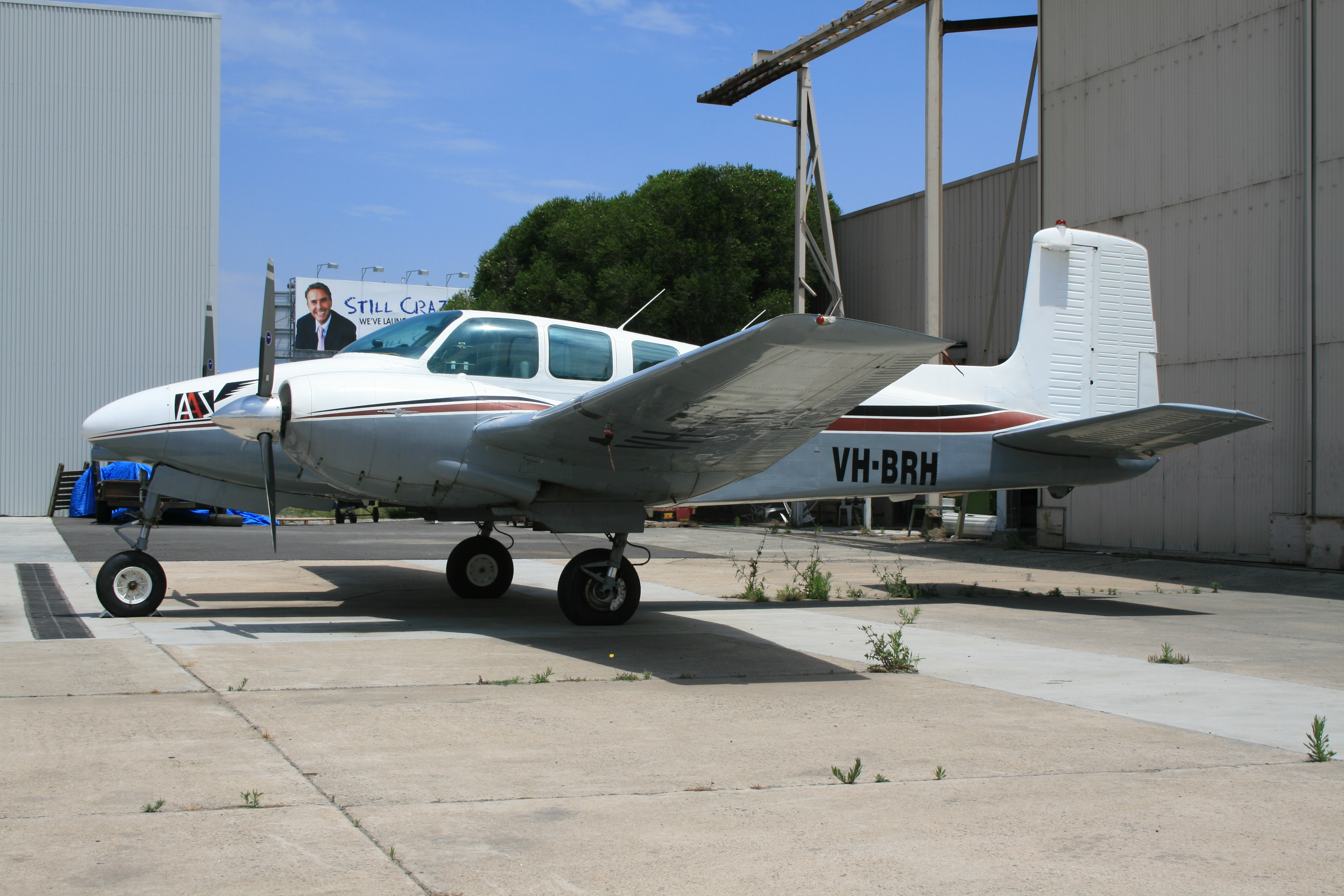
Beechcraft J50 Twin Bonanza

Model 50
Initial production version powered by two Lycoming GO-435-C2 engines, 13 built (six for the US Army, remainder civilian versions, with the first two production numbers for factory evaluation). As of 2010, only one Model 50 is still registered and flying (serial number H-7). As of June 2016, Serial Number H-7 is owned by W. Hulsey Smith through his holding company Archangel Technologies, LLC, as part of the Archangel Collection.
Model B50
Upgraded Model 50 with increased takeoff weight, extra cabin windows and improved cabin heating, 139 built (40 for the US Army).
Model C50
Superseded the B50; fitted with 275 hp (205 kW) Lycoming GO-480-F1A6 engines, 155 built (one to United States Air Force).
Model D50
Superseded the C50; fitted with 295 hp (220 kW) Lycoming GO-480-G2C6 engines, 154 built (six to US Army).
Model D50A
Upgraded D50 fitted with GO-480-G2D6 engines, 44 built.
Model D50B
Upgraded D50A with new passenger steps and improved baggage area, 38 built.
Model D50C
Upgraded D50B with starboard airstair entry door, three rows of seats, improved air conditioning, larger baggage area, 64 built.
Model D50E
Upgraded D50C with extra portside window, squared-off rear starboard window, pointed nose and 295 hp (220 kW) Lycoming GO-480-G2F6 engines, 47 built.
Model E50
Supercharged version of the D50; with increased takeoff weight and 340 hp (250 kW) supercharged GSO-480-B1B6 engines, 181 built (mostly for the US Army).
Model F50
Supercharged version of the D50A with GSO-480-B1B6 engines, 26 built including one converted to G50 standard.
Model G50
Supercharged version of the D50B with 340 hp (250 kW) IGSO-480-A1A6 engines, increased fuel capacity and increased takeoff weight, one conversion from F50 plus 23 built.
Model H50
Supercharged version of the D50C with increased takeoff weight and IGSO-480-A1A6 engines, 30 built.
Model J50
Supercharged version of the D50E with 340 hp (250 kW) IGSO-480-A1B6 engines and increased takeoff weight, 27 built.
Model K50
Unbuilt variant. Serial numbers KH-1 through KH-38 were allocated for this variant.

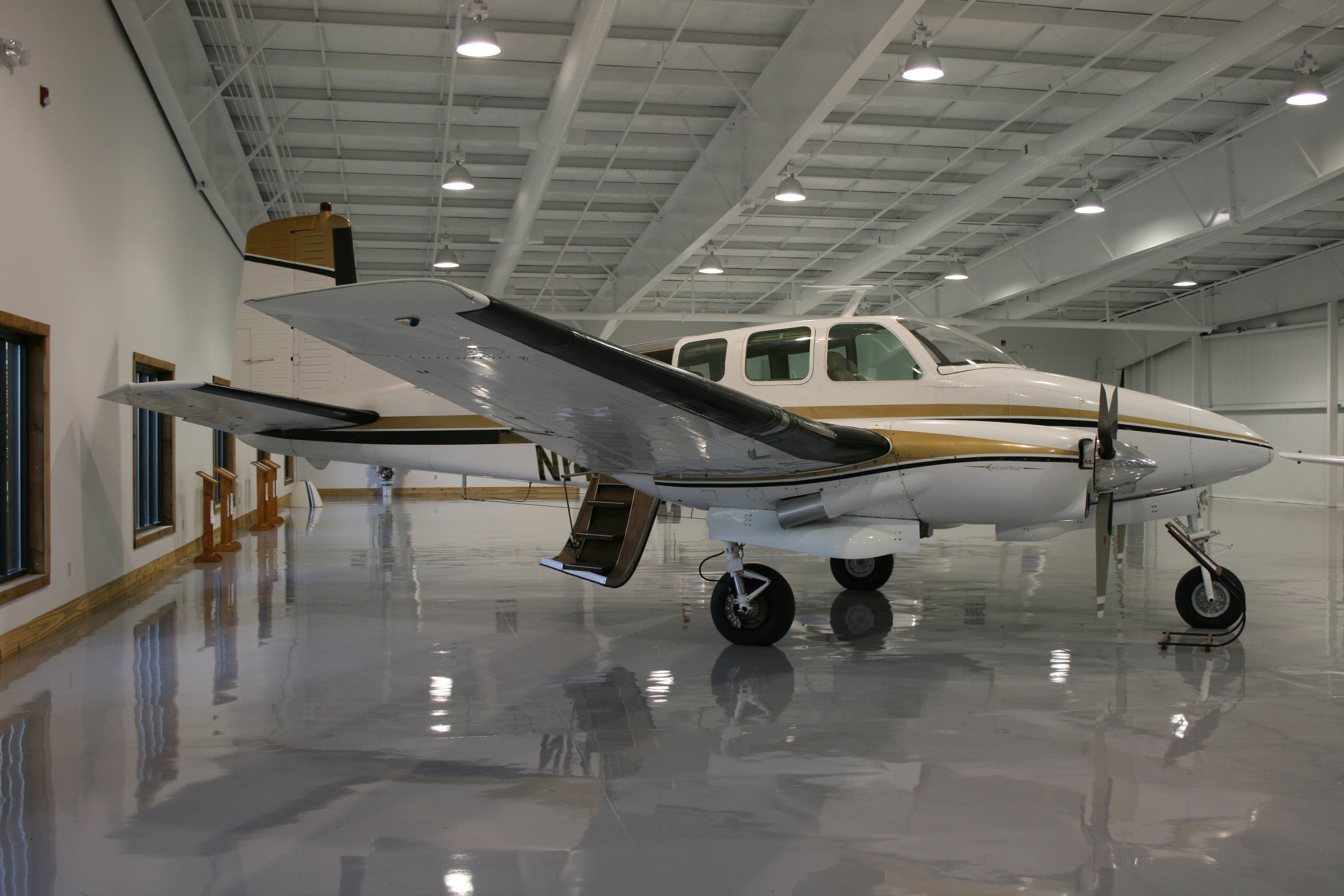
The Excalibur 800 modification

Excalibur 800
A modification designed originally by Swearingen Aircraft and taken over by the Excalibur Aviation Company which re-engines the Twin Bonanza with two 400 HP (298 kW) Avco Lycoming IO-720-A1A flat-eight engines in a new cowling and revised exhaust system. Other optional improvements were also available.
L-23 Seminole
Military version

== Operators ==
=== Military operators ===
Chile
Chilean Air Force (5 x C50, 4 x D50)
Colombia
Colombian Air Force (1 x D50)
Jordan
Royal Jordanian Air Force (1 x F50)
Morocco
Royal Moroccan Air Force
Switzerland
Swiss Air Force (3 x E50)
Uruguay
Uruguayan Air Force

== Accidents and incidents ==
The Beechcraft Twin Bonanza has been involved in the following notable accidents and incidents:

- On 24 July 1966, American professional golfer Tony Lema, his wife, and two others were killed when the aircraft struck terrain during an apparent ditching attempt in a lake near their intended destination, Lansing Municipal Airport.

== Specifications (D50) ==
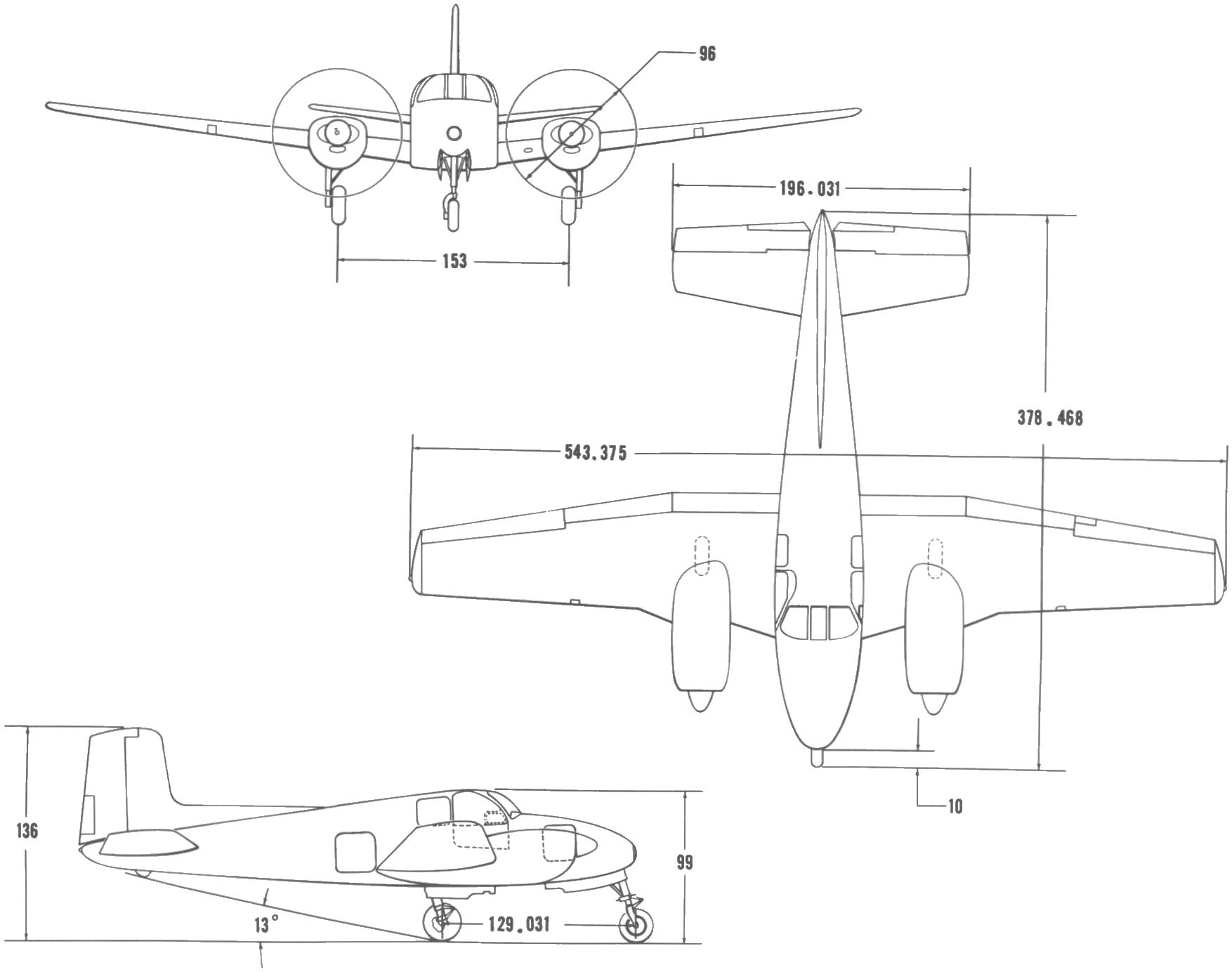
3-view line drawing of the Beechcraft L-23A Seminole

Data from Jane's All The World's Aircraft 1956–57

General characteristics

- Crew: 1
- Capacity: 5 passengers
- Length: 31 ft 6 1/2 in (9.61 m)
- Wingspan: 45 ft 3 3/8 in (13.80 m)
- Height: 11 ft 4 in (3.45 m)
- Wing area: 277 sq ft (25.7 m^{2})
- Aspect ratio: 7.51:1
- Empty weight: 3,981 lb (1,806 kg)
- Gross weight: 6,300 lb (2,858 kg)
- Fuel capacity: 180 US gal (150 imp gal; 680 L)
- Powerplant: 2 × Lycoming GO-480-C206 air-cooled flat-six, 295 hp (220 kW) each

Performance

- Maximum speed: 214 mph (344 km/h, 186 kn) at 2,500 ft (760 m)
- Cruise speed: 203 mph (327 km/h, 176 kn) at 7,000 ft (2,100 m) (70% power)
- Range: 1,650 mi (2,660 km, 1,430 nmi) at 10,000 ft (3,000 m) and 160 mph (140 kn; 260 km/h)
- Service ceiling: 20,000 ft (6,100 m)
- Rate of climb: 1,450 ft/min (7.4 m/s)
- Take-off run to 50 ft (15 m): 410 yd (1,230 ft; 370 m)
- Landing run from 50 ft (15 m): 458 yd (1,374 ft; 419 m)

== See also ==
Related development

- L-23/U-8 Seminole
- Beechcraft Travel Air
- Beechcraft Queen Air
- Beechcraft King Air

Aircraft of comparable role, configuration, and era

- Aero Commander 500
- Cessna 310
- Cessna 401
- Piper PA-23
- Piper PA-31 Navajo
- Piper Aerostar
