= 60S ribosomal protein L5 =

Protein found in humans

RPL5
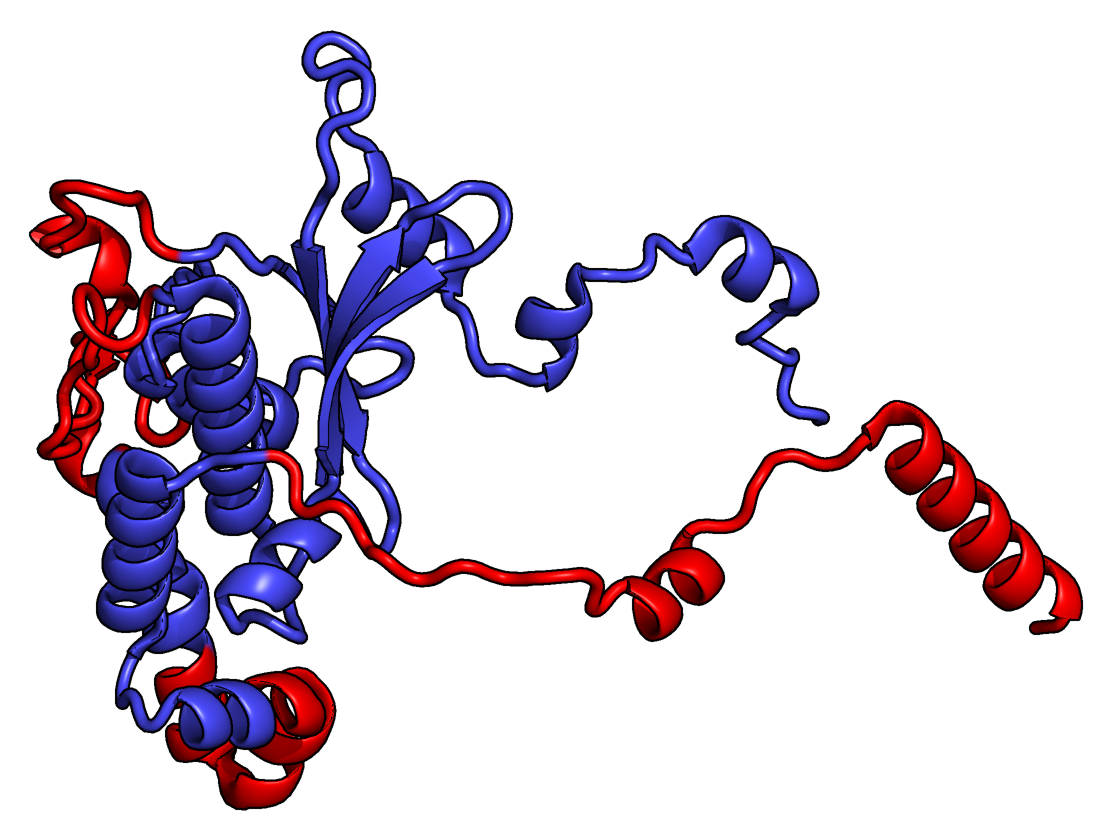

Identifiers
- Aliases: RPL5, DBA6, L5, PPP1R135, MSTP030, Ribosomal protein L5, uL18
- External IDs: OMIM: 603634; MGI: 102854; GeneCards: RPL5
Available structures
PDB	Ortholog search: PDBe RCSB
PDB	List of PDB id codes 4UG0, 4V6X, 5AJ0, 4UJD, 4D67, 4D5Y, 4UJE, 4UJC

Gene location (Human)
Chr.	Chromosome 1 (human)
Band	1p22.1	Start	92,832,013 bp
Band	1p22.1	End	92,841,924 bp

Gene location (Mouse)
Chr.	Chromosome 5 (mouse)
Band	5 F|5 52.23 cM	Start	108,048,368 bp
Band	5 F|5 52.23 cM	End	108,056,871 bp
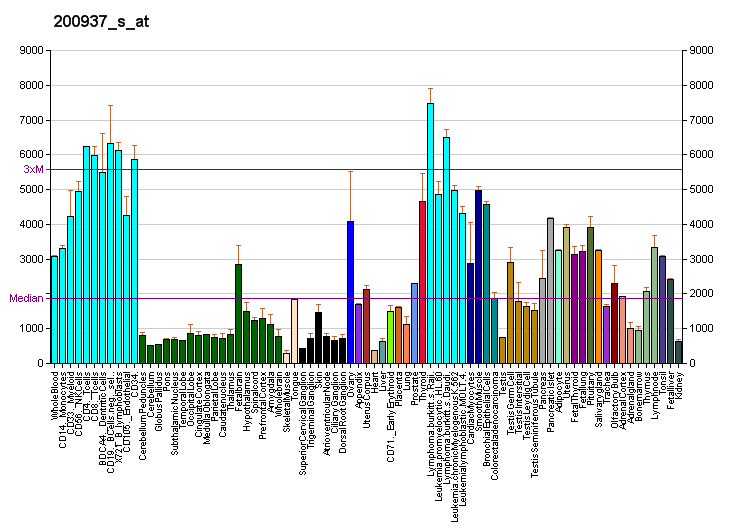

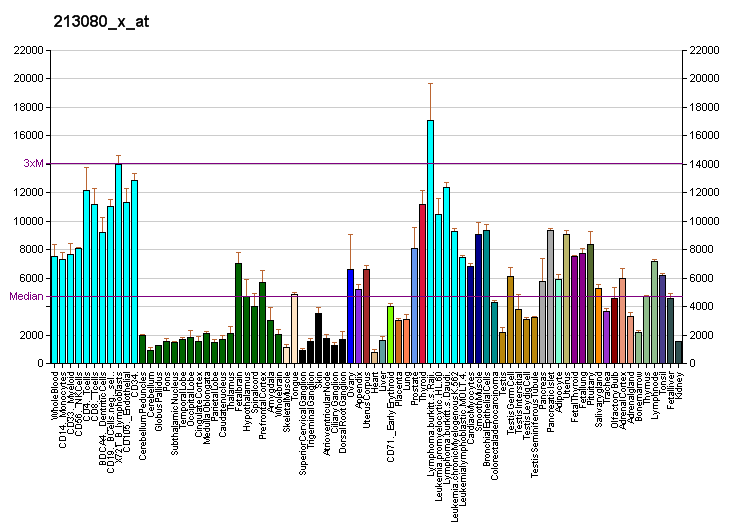

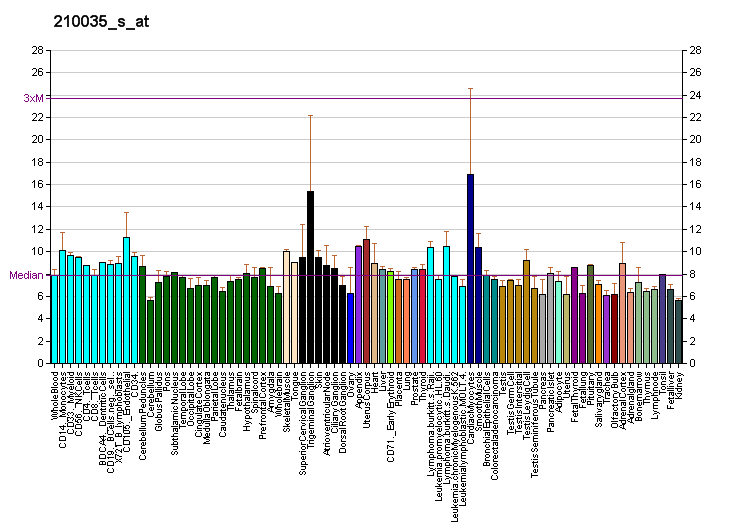
RNA expression pattern
Bgee	Human / Mouse (ortholog); Top expressed in: germinal epithelium; gonad; parietal pleura; epithelium of nasopharynx; left ovary; tibia; right ovary; palpebral conjunctiva; ventricular zone; body of uterus / Top expressed in: epiblast; uterus; ovary; ventricular zone; embryo; ganglionic eminence; embryo; lens; spermatocyte; ileum; More reference expression data
BioGPS	More reference expression data
Gene ontology
Molecular function	rRNA binding; protein binding; RNA binding; structural constituent of ribosome; mRNA 3'-UTR binding; 5S rRNA binding; ubiquitin protein ligase binding; mRNA 5'-UTR binding; ubiquitin ligase inhibitor activity
Cellular component	cytoplasm; cytosol; ribosome; membrane; focal adhesion; intracellular anatomical structure; nucleolus; cytosolic large ribosomal subunit; extracellular exosome; nucleus; nucleoplasm; endoplasmic reticulum; protein-containing complex; synapse; ribonucleoprotein complex
Biological process	viral transcription; SRP-dependent cotranslational protein targeting to membrane; ribosomal large subunit biogenesis; translational initiation; nuclear-transcribed mRNA catabolic process, nonsense-mediated decay; rRNA processing; ribosomal large subunit assembly; protein biosynthesis; positive regulation of gene expression; positive regulation of translation; protein stabilization; negative regulation of ubiquitin protein ligase activity; negative regulation of ubiquitin-dependent protein catabolic process; negative regulation of protein neddylation; regulation of signal transduction by p53 class mediator
Sources:Amigo / QuickGO
Orthologs
Databases	NCBI: entry; OMA: entry
Species	Human	Mouse
Entrez	6125	100503670
Ensembl	ENSG00000122406	ENSMUSG00000058558
UniProt	P46777; Q5T7N0	P47962
RefSeq (mRNA)	NM_000969	NM_016980
RefSeq (protein)	NP_000960	NP_058676
Location (UCSC)	Chr 1: 92.83 – 92.84 Mb	Chr 5: 108.05 – 108.06 Mb
PubMed search
- Wikidata
View/Edit Human	View/Edit Mouse

60S ribosomal protein L5 is a protein that in humans is encoded by the RPL5 gene.

== Function ==
Ribosomes, the organelles that catalyze protein synthesis, consist of a small 40S subunit and a large 60S subunit. Together these subunits are composed of 4 RNA species and approximately 80 structurally distinct proteins. This gene encodes a ribosomal protein that is a component of the 60S subunit. The protein belongs to the L18P family of ribosomal proteins. It is located in the cytoplasm. The protein binds 5S rRNA to form a stable complex called the 5S ribonucleoprotein particle (RNP), which is necessary for the transport of nonribosome-associated cytoplasmic 5S rRNA to the nucleolus for assembly into ribosomes. The protein interacts specifically with the beta subunit of casein kinase 2.

== Clinical significance ==
Variable expression of this gene in colorectal cancers compared to adjacent normal tissues has been observed, although no correlation between the level of expression and the severity of the disease has been found. This gene is co-transcribed with the small nucleolar RNA gene U21, which is located in its fifth intron. As is typical for genes encoding ribosomal proteins, there are multiple processed pseudogenes of this gene dispersed through the genome.

== Interactions ==
Ribosomal protein L5 has been shown to interact with:

- CSNK2B,
- EIF5A,
- Mdm2, and
- PDCD4.
