= Lycoming O-480 =

Family of aircraft engines

GO-480
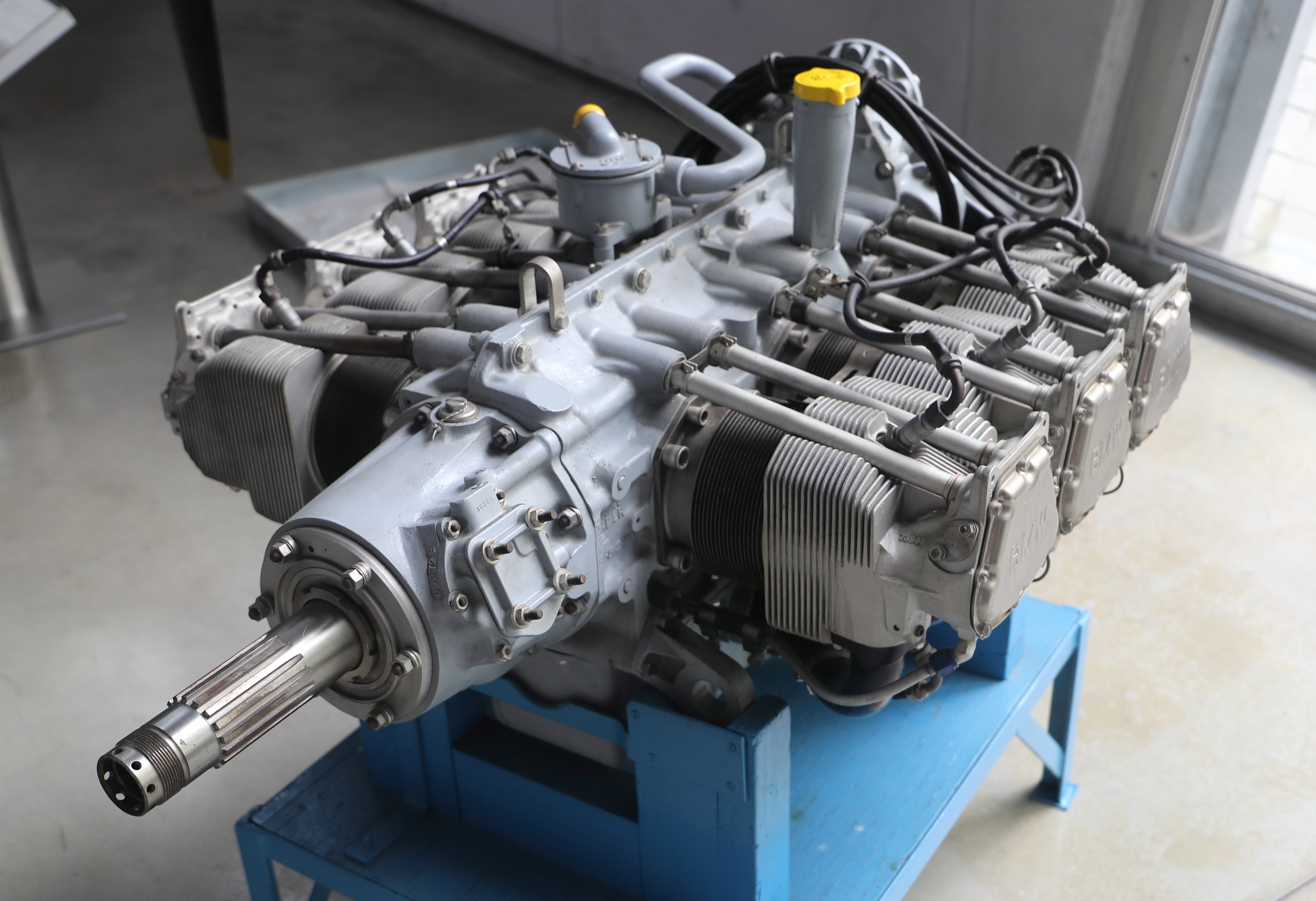
- Lycoming GO-480-B1 on display at the Deutsches Museum Flugwerft Schleissheim
- Type: Piston aero-engine
- National origin: United States
- Manufacturer: Lycoming Engines
- First run: 1953
- Major applications: Dornier Do 27; Helio Courier; Utva 66
- Manufactured: 1954–1986 out of production
- Developed from: Lycoming O-320

The Lycoming GO-480 is a family of six-cylinder, horizontally opposed fixed-wing aircraft engines of 479.6 cubic inch (7.86 L) displacement, made by Lycoming Engines. The engine is a six-cylinder version of the four-cylinder Lycoming O-320.

== Design and development ==
GO-480 series engines are installed on a number of different aircraft types. Their main competitive engines are the Continental IO-520 and IO-550 series.

== Variants ==
All engines have an additional prefix preceding the 480 to indicate the specific configuration of the engine. Although the series is known as the "O-480", there are only geared engines in the series. There are also numerous engine suffixes, denoting different accessories such as different manufacturers' carburetors, or different magnetos.

GO-480
Normally aspirated Opposed engine, equipped with a carburetor and Gearbox at the front end of the crankshaft to drive the propeller at a lower RPM than the engine.

GSO-480
Supercharger driven by the engine, gearbox to drive propeller, and equipped with a carburetor. Designated the O-480-1 by the US military.

IGSO-480
Supercharger driven by the engine, gearbox to drive propeller, with fuel injection. Designated the O-480-3 by the US military.

IGO-480
Gearbox to drive propeller, normally aspirated with fuel injection.

== Applications ==
- Aero Commander 560, 560A, 560E and 680, 680E and the pressurized 720 Alti-Cruiser.
- Aermacchi AM3CM (Bosbok)
- Beechcraft Twin Bonanza
- Beechcraft Queen Air
- Dornier Do 27
- Fuji KM-2
- Fuji T-3
- Helio Courier
- Pilatus PC-6 Porter
- Soko J-20 Kraguj
- Temco 58
- Utva 66

== Specifications (GSO-480-A1A6) ==
Data from FAA Type Certificate.

=== General characteristics ===
- Type: Six-cylinder air-cooled geared supercharged horizontally opposed engine
- Bore: 5.125 in (130 mm)
- Stroke: 3.875 in (98 mm)
- Displacement: 479.6 in^{3} (7.86 L)
- Dry weight: 498 lb dry (226 kg)

=== Components ===
- Valvetrain: Two overhead valves per cylinder
- Supercharger: 11.27:1 ratio, providing 48" Hg (1.6 atm / 8.8 psi) manifold pressure at sea level at maximum power
- Fuel type: 100 octane rating gasoline
- Cooling system: Air-cooled
- Reduction gear: 77:120 (.642:1)

=== Performance ===
- Power output: 340 hp at 3,400 rpm at sea level
- Compression ratio: 7.3:1

== See also ==
Comparable engines

- Continental O-470

Related lists

- List of aircraft engines
