= Small nucleolar RNA SNORD21 =

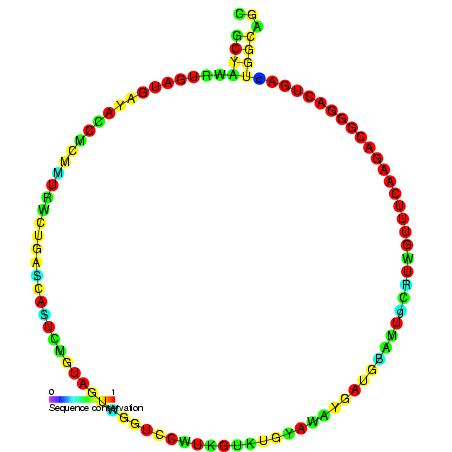
- Predicted secondary structure and sequence conservation of SNORD21

Identifiers
- Symbol: SNORD21
- Alt. Symbols: U21
- Rfam: RF00068

Other data
- RNA type: Gene; snRNA; snoRNA; CD-box
- Domain: Eukaryota
- GO: GO:0006396 GO:0005730
- SO: SO:0000593
- PDB structures: PDBe

In molecular biology, U21 is a member of the C/D class of snoRNA which contain the C (UGAUGA) and D (CUGA) box motifs. U21 is encoded within an intron of the gene for ribosomal protein L5 in mammals, but within introns of the ADP ribosylation factor gene in Drosophila. U21 snoRNA has a 13 nucleotide region of complementarity with an invariant region of eukaryotic 28S ribosomal RNA.
