= Beechcraft U-21 Ute =

American utility aircraft

U-21 Ute
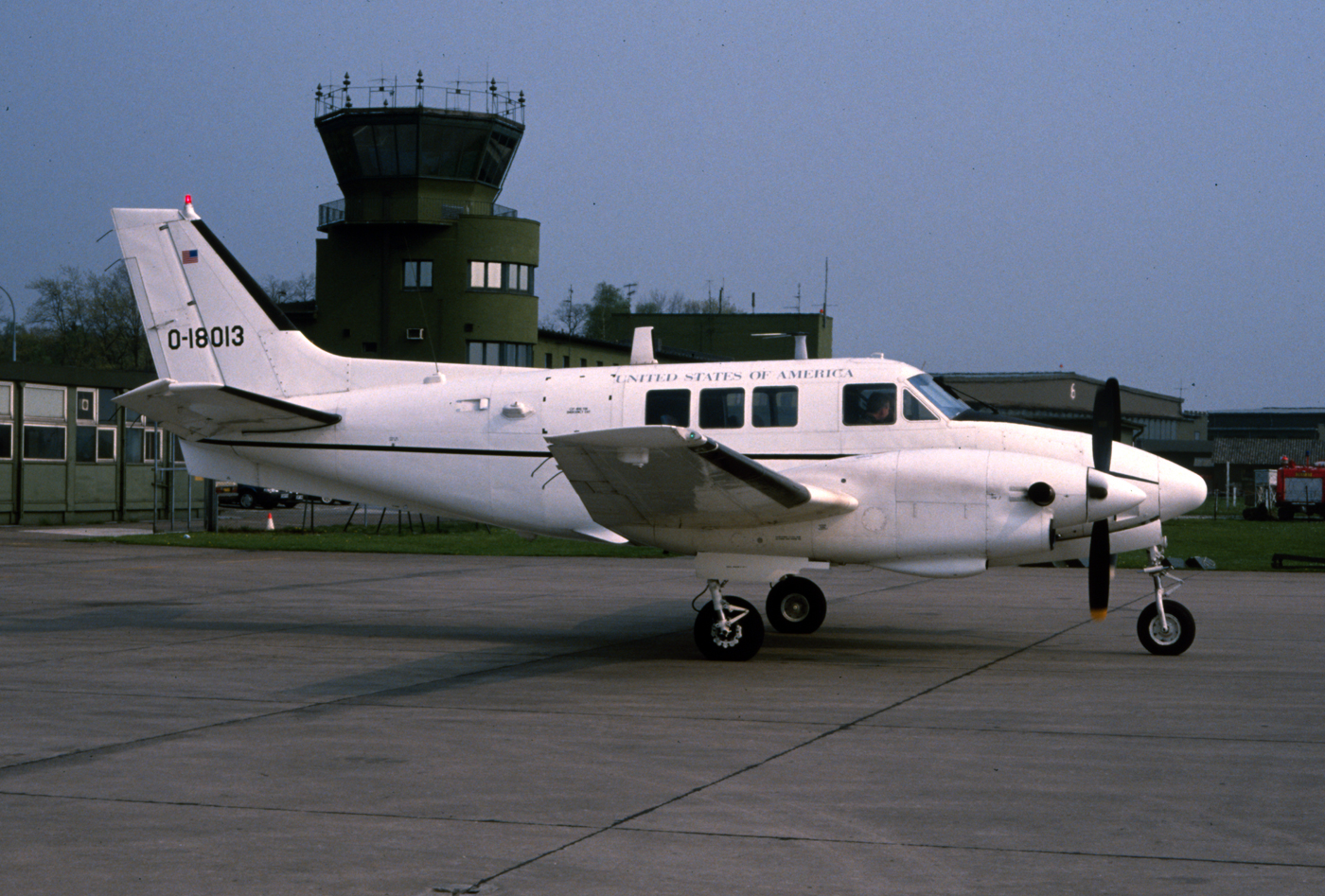
- U-21A of the United States Army

General information
- Type: Utility aircraft
- National origin: United States
- Manufacturer: Beechcraft
- Status: In civilian service
- Primary users: United States Army (historical) United States Navy (historical); Dynamic Aviation
- Number built: 171

History
- Introduction date: 27 April 1967
- First flight: 15 May 1963
- Retired: 4 January 2000 (US Army)
- Developed from: Beechcraft Queen Air; Beechcraft King Air

The Beechcraft U-21 Ute is an American utility aircraft built by Beechcraft for the United States Army. Originally developed as a re-engined turboprop version of the Beechcraft Queen Air, the YU-21 prototype served as a proof of concept for the highly successful King Air family, from which the later U-21F variant was directly derived. While most U-21s were built as utility aircraft, some were either built or modified for the signals intelligence role as the RU-21. Many U-21s were sold to civil buyers as military surplus after retirement by the Army, with most being acquired by Dynamic Aviation.

== Design and development ==
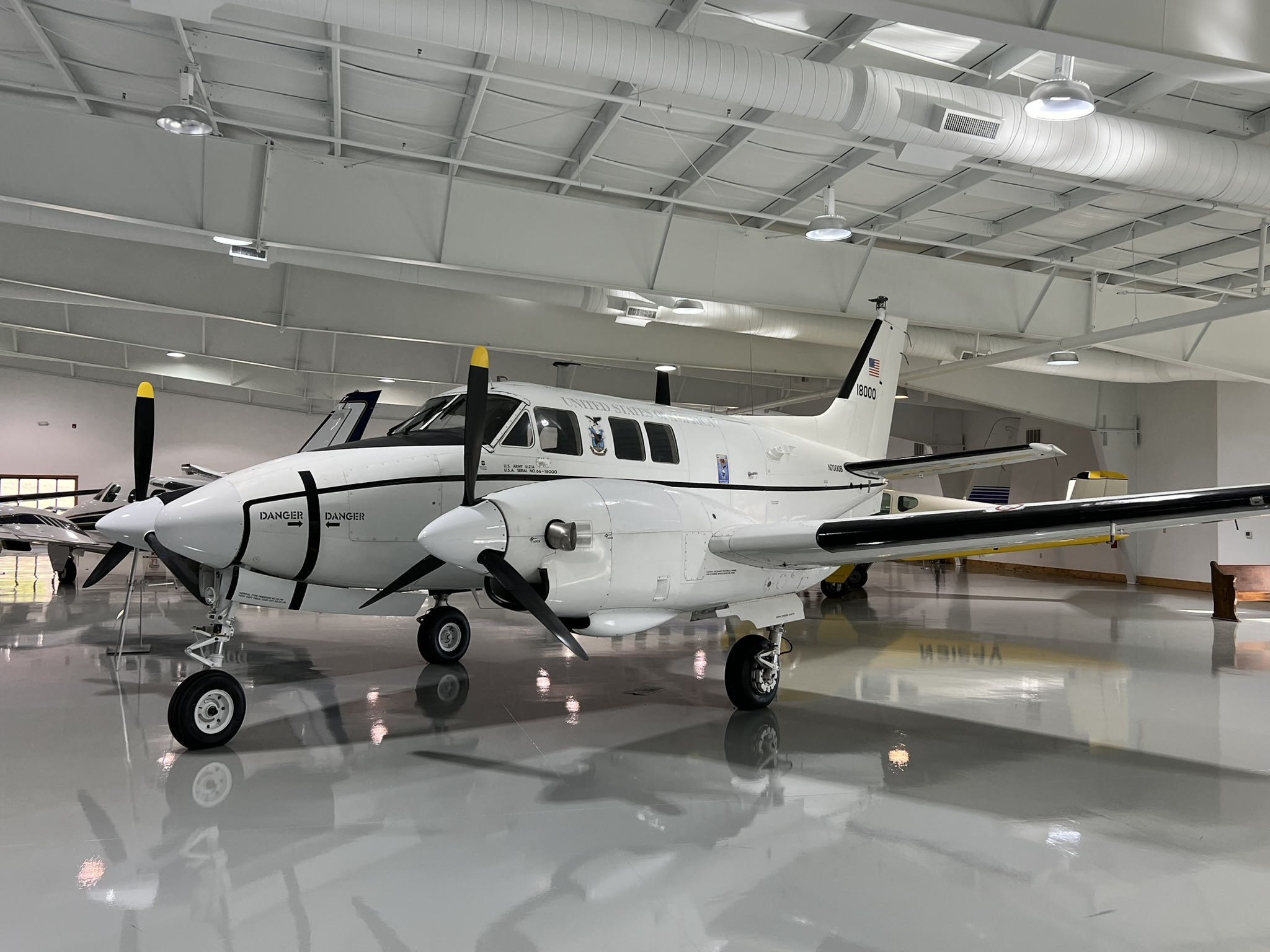
The first production U-21A at the Beechcraft Heritage Museum.

In 1963, Beechcraft modified a single Model 65-80 Queen Air with a pair of 500 shp (370 kW) Pratt & Whitney Canada PT6A-6 turboprop engines under the internal designation Model 87 as a proof of concept for the Model 65-90 King Air. This project was originally designated as the L-23G by the US Army, but was redesignated under the 1962 Tri-Service system as the NU-8F prior to its first flight and later as the YU-21. Per the Army's tradition of naming aircraft after native tribes, the NU-8F and later U-21s were named after the Ute people. The Model 87 served as the basis for the civilian Model 65-90 King Air. The United States Army awarded Beechcraft with a production contract for their Model 65-A90-1 variant under the designation U-21A in October 1966. Compared to the NU-8F, the U-21A retains the unpressurized fuselage of the Model 65-80 Queen Air while featuring the new wings, tail, and undercarriage of the Model 65-90 King Air. Power is provided by a pair of 550 shp (410 kW) PT6A-20 engines, which were designated T74-CP-700 under the US military engine designation system, driving three-bladed Hartzell propellers. The interior can be fitted with a number of arrangements for different missions, including use as a cargo transport or air ambulance, and is capable of carrying up to ten passengers in troop transport configuration. The final 17 Model 65-A90-1s were built as the U-21G with a revised cockpit layout.

The RU-21D was developed as a replacement for the earlier RU-6 Beaver and RU-8 Seminole airborne radio direction finding (ARDF) aircraft. The RU-21D was the first aircraft to be fitted with an inertial navigation system, and was also fitted with an AN/ARD-23 Laffing Eagle radio direction finding system. Several variants and conversions followed with different equipment, including the RU-21E with the AN/ARD-26 Left Foot ARDF system and the JU-21A with the AN/ARD-28 Left Jab.

In 1967, McDonnell Douglas began development of the coordinated multi-aircraft AN/ULQ-11 Cefirm Leader ARDF and countermeasures system. The complete system comprised four aircraft; two RU-21A ARDF aircraft, a single RU-21B master control/signals intercept aircraft, the a single RU-21C jamming aircraft. While the RU-21A was based on the standard U-21A, the RU-21B and RU-21C differed significantly in that they were powered by a pair of 620 shp (460 kW) T74-CP-702 (PT6A-29) engines and were fitted with the redesigned main gear struts of the Beechcraft Model 99.

In July 1971, ESL Incorporated began development of the Guardrail signals intelligence system, which was operated remotely by ground-based technicians rather than onboard operators. The first iteration of the system, known as Guardrail I, was tested on three U-21Gs. Six RU-21Es had also been fitted with the improved Guardrail II system by July 1972, followed by twelve aircraft with the Guardrail IIA in December 1972, and finally the Guardrail IV in 1973. The first operational version of the system was the Guardrail V, which was installed on 21 former U-21G and RU-21D/E/G airframes under the designation RU-21H.

Five Model A100 King Airs were delivered to the US Army in October 1971 under the designation U-21F. These were the first A100s to be delivered. Unlike previous U-21 models, these aircraft were considered "true" King Airs as they were off-the-shelf civilian models with pressurized fuselages. The U-21F is powered by a pair of PT6A-28 engines driving four-bladed Hartzell propellers. The U-21F was technically capable of carrying 13 passengers, but was fitted with a VIP interior with eight seats.

In 1974, the US Army acquired three Model 200 Super King Air aircraft under the designation RU-21J for use in the development of the planned replacement for the Guardrail system. The aircraft, which was nicknamed "Huron" after the Huron people, was fitted with the AN/USQ-71 Cefly Lancer system. As the RU-21J was based on the Super King Air, the aircraft differed significantly from previous U-21 variants in that it had a lengened pressurized fuselage, redesigned wings, a T-tail, and was powered by a pair of 850 shp (630 kW) PT6A-41 engines driving three-bladed Hartzell Model HC-B3TN-3/T10178 propellers. The Model 200 Super King Air was later selected as the winner of the joint US Army/Air Force UC-CX-X competition and was ordered into production as the C-12 Huron in August 1974. Following the completion of the Cefly Lancer development program in the late 1970s, the three RU-21Js were converted to VIP transports and given the new designation C-12L.

== Operational history ==
RU-21E at Camp Humphreys in the late 1970s

The NU-8F prototype made its first flight on 15 May 1963. After about 10 months of flight testing, the aircraft was delivered to the US Army in March 1964, which conducted a three-month evaluation of the NU-8F at Fort Rucker, Alabama. The U-21A made its first flight in March 1967, and the aircraft received its airworthiness certification from the Federal Aviation Administration the following month on 27 April. Deliveries to the US Army began on 16 May 1967. The Model A100-based U-21F entered service in 1971, becoming the US Army's first pressurized aircraft.

The U-21 saw service during the Vietnam War. At least five EU-21As were flown by the 1st Signal Brigade. A JU-21A was shot down over North Vietnam on 16 February 1973, resulting in the loss of its five-man crew. This was the only U-21 lost to enemy fire during the war.

The Model 200-derived RU-21J was delivered to the Army in 1972. These aircraft had been converted to C-12L Huron standard in the late 1970s before being retired in 1997. All three former RU-21J/C-12L aircraft were on the civil register as of late 2003.

The US Army began replacing its RU-21 aircraft with the Super King Air-derived RC-12 Guardrail in 1984, with the last aircraft being retired after the Cold War. In 1996, Dynamic Aviation of Bridgewater, Virginia purchased 124 unpressurized U-21s from the US Army. The Army retired the U-21F in 1996, with four aircraft being transferred to the United States Naval Test Pilot School at NAS Patuxent River. The Navy retired these aircraft in 1999. The fifth aircraft was used as a flying testbed by the Science Applications International Corporation. The last U-21 in US Army service, JU-21H serial number 70-15888, was retired on 4 January 2000.

== Variants ==
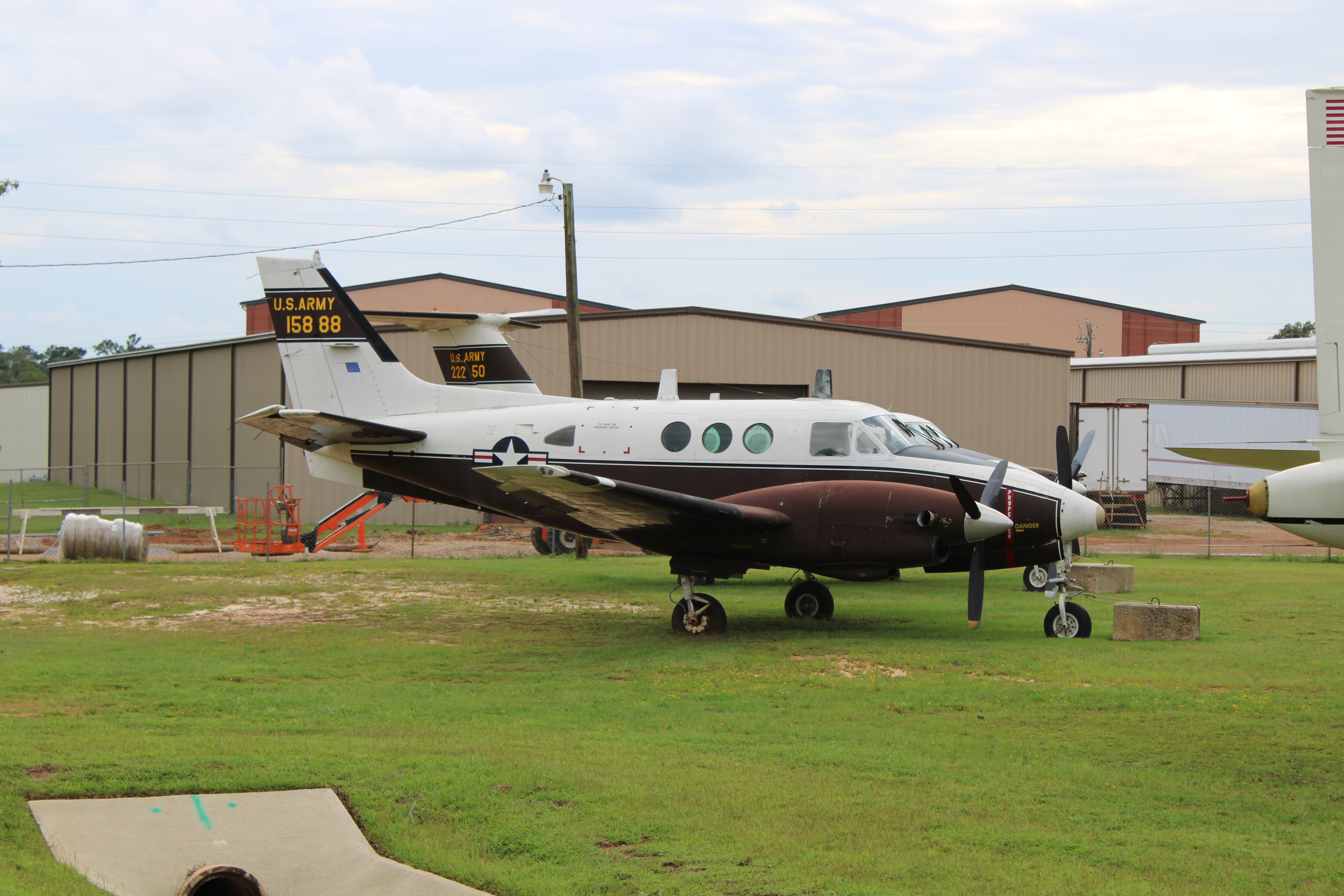
JU-21H at the United States Army Aviation Museum. Though unpressurized, this aircraft has been fitted with round windows similar to the pressurized King Air.

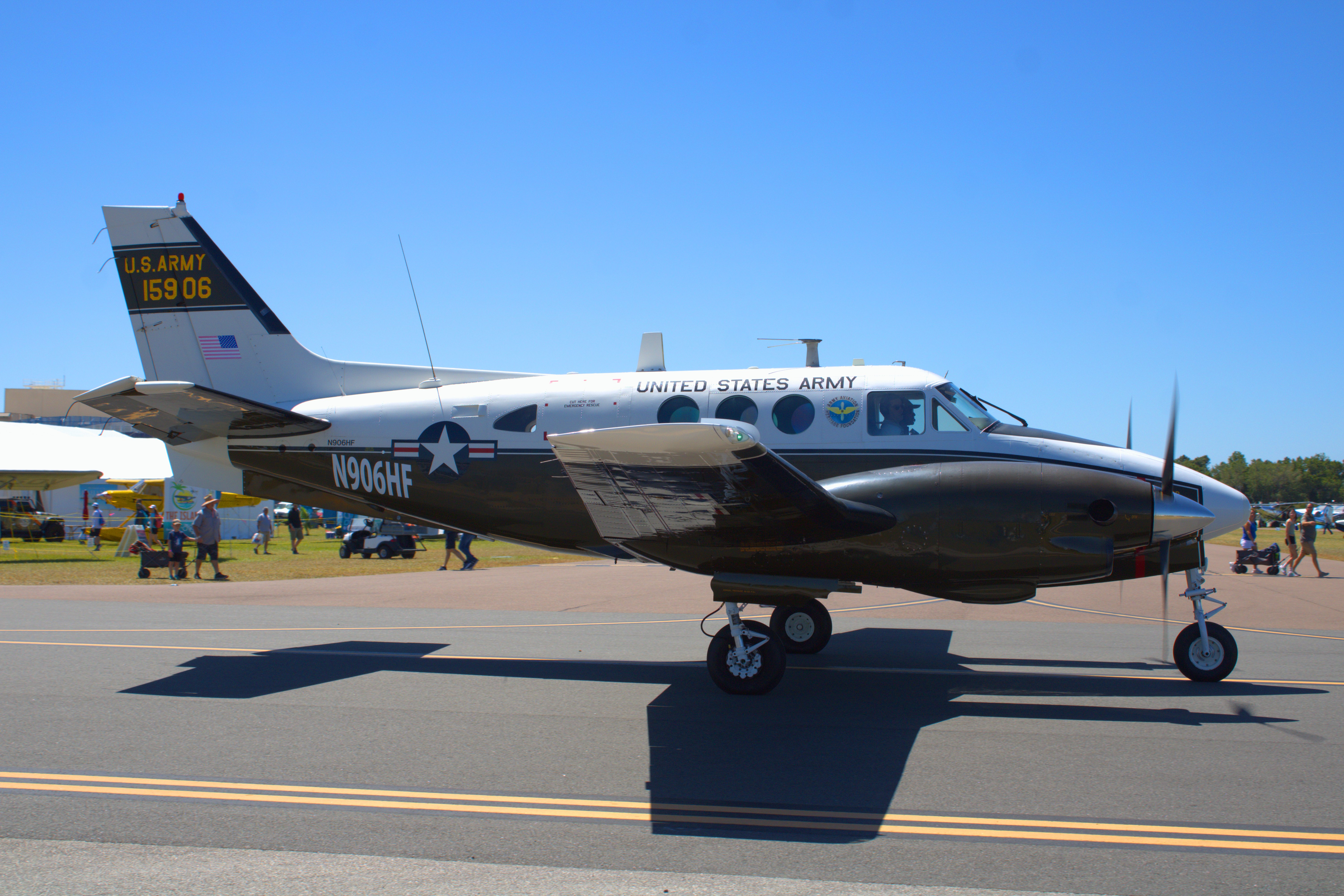
A JU-21G warbird at the 2024 Sun 'n Fun airshow.

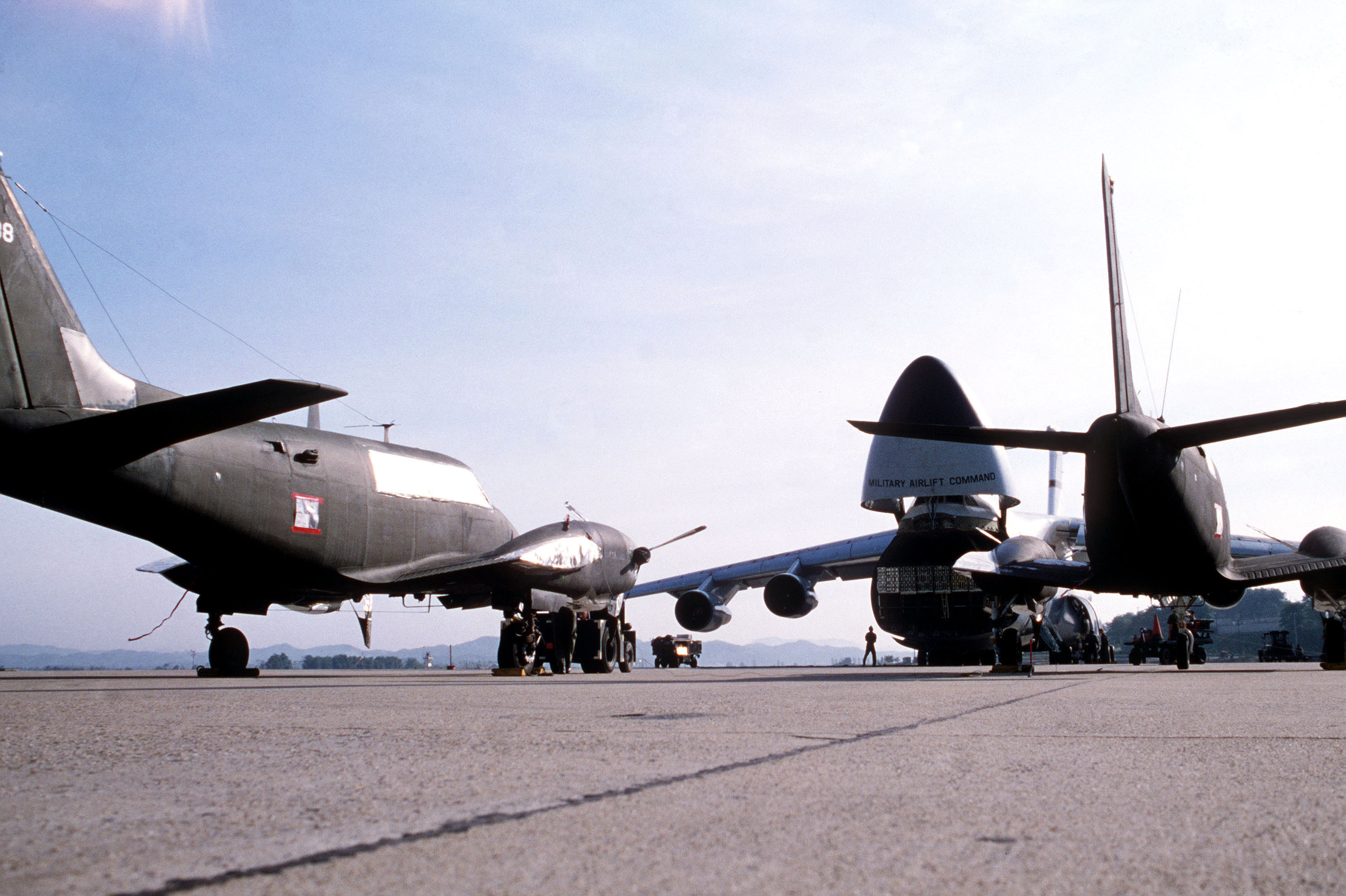
Two U-21Fs partially disassembled for transport in a Lockheed C-5 Galaxy.

YU-21
Company designation Model 87. Originally designated L-23G and later NU-8F, a single Model 65-80 Queen Air modified as a proof of concept for the Model 65-90 King Air with 500 shp (370 kW) Pratt & Whitney Canada PT6A-6 turboprop engines.
U-21A
Company designation Model 65-A90-1. Production variant based on the YU-21 but with the wings, tail, and undercarriage of the Model 65-90 King Air and powered by 550 hp (410 kW) T74-CP-700 (PT6A-20) engines. Unlike the civilian King Air, the U-21A has an unpressurized cabin, square cabin windows, and a large cargo door. Of the 141 Model 65-A90-1s built, 102 were built to this standard. Many U-21As were later modified as special electronic mission aircraft.
EU-21A
Conversion of at least five U-21As as radio relay aircraft for use over Vietnam. These aircraft were fitted with temporary specialized mission equipment and folding canvas benches in the rear cabin in place of the original airline-type seats. Later re-converted to U-21A standard.
GU-21A
Designation applied to two U-21As used for ground training.
JU-21A
Conversion of three U-21As with the AN/ARD-28 Left Jab signals intelligence (SIGINT) system. One aircraft was lost over Vietnam, and the two surviving aircraft were later re-converted to U-21A standard.
RU-21A
Company designation Model 65-A90-1. Variant designed to serve as the airborne radio direction finding (ARDF) component of the AN/ULQ-11 Cefirm Leader system with an AN/ARD-22 ARDF set and a crew of four; two pilots and two equipment operators. The aircraft was originally fitted with flat dipole antennas on the wings, but these were later replaced with wingtip pods. Four built.
RU-21B
Company designation Model 65-A90-2. Variant designed to serve as the master control and signals intercept component of Cefirm Leader system with an AN/ALR-32 electronic countermeasures receiving set, 620 shp (460 kW) T74-CP-702 (PT6A-29) engines, the main landing gear of the Beechcraft Model 99, and a crew of five; two pilots and three equipment operators. Three built.
RU-21C
Company designation Model 65-A90-3. Variant designed to serve as the jamming component of Cefirm Leader system. Similar to the RU-21B, but equipped with an AN/ALT-29 electronic countermeasures transmission set and a crew of four; two pilots and two equipment operators. Two built.
RU-21D
Company designation Model 65-A90-1. SIGINT variant with the AN/ARD-23 Laffing Eagle radio direction finding system and powered by PT6A-28 or PT6A-34 engines. 34 aircraft were ordered, but only 18 were completed to this standard. The Laffing Eagle system was never deployed operationally, though three aircraft were later converted to RU-21H standard.
JRU-21D
Designation applied to a single RU-21D used as a testbed.
U-21D
Designation applied to several RU-21Ds (most of those not converted to RU-21H standard) with Laffing Eagle equipment removed.
RU-21E
Company designation Model 65-A90-4. SIGINT variant based on the U-21A with the AN/ARD-26 Left Foot ARDF system. Left Foot was never deployed operationally, but six aircraft were later fitted with the Guardrail II system, followed by twelve aircraft fitted with the Guardrail IIA and later Guardrail IV systems. The final 16 aircraft of the original RU-21D order were completed to this standard. All RU-21E aircraft were eventually converted to RU-21H standard.
U-21F
Five off-the-shelf Model A100 King Airs used by US Army as transport/utility aircraft. Compared to other U-21 variants, the U-21F has a stretched fuselage with a pressurized cabin, 680 shp (510 kW) PT6A-28 engines driving four-bladed Hartzell HC-B4TN-3/T10173 propellers, and a VIP interior with eight seats.
U-21G
Company designation Model 65-A90-1. As U-21A but with a modified cockpit layout. 17 built.
JU-21G
Variant used by the United States Army Aeromedical Research Laboratory for research purposes.
RU-21G
Potentially unofficial designation for three U-21Gs fitted with the Guardrail I SIGINT system in 1971. All three aircraft were later converted to RU-21H standard.
RU-21H
Conversion of 21 assorted U-21G and RU-21D/E/G aircraft to carry the fully-operational Guardrail V SIGINT system. The RU-21H was certified with a higher gross weight than earlier models.
U-21H
Utility modification of obsolete RU-21 aircraft with SIGINT equipment removed. 36 conversions were originally planned, though only 23 were completed before the Army received the Air Force's former C-12F Huron fleet.
JU-21H
Two former RU-21Es converted as test aircraft.
RU-21J Huron
Company designation Model A100-1, though these were actually the first three production civilian Model 200 Super King Air aircraft acquired by the US Army for use in the AN/USQ-71 Cefly Lancer program in 1972. As such, the RU-21J differed significantly from the other U-21 variants in that it had a longer fuselage, a T-tail, and was powered by 850 shp (630 kW) Pratt & Whitney Canada PT6A-41 engines. The RU-12J served as the basis for the C-12 Huron, and all three aircraft were modified as VIP transports and given the designation C-12L in the late 1970s.

== Operators ==
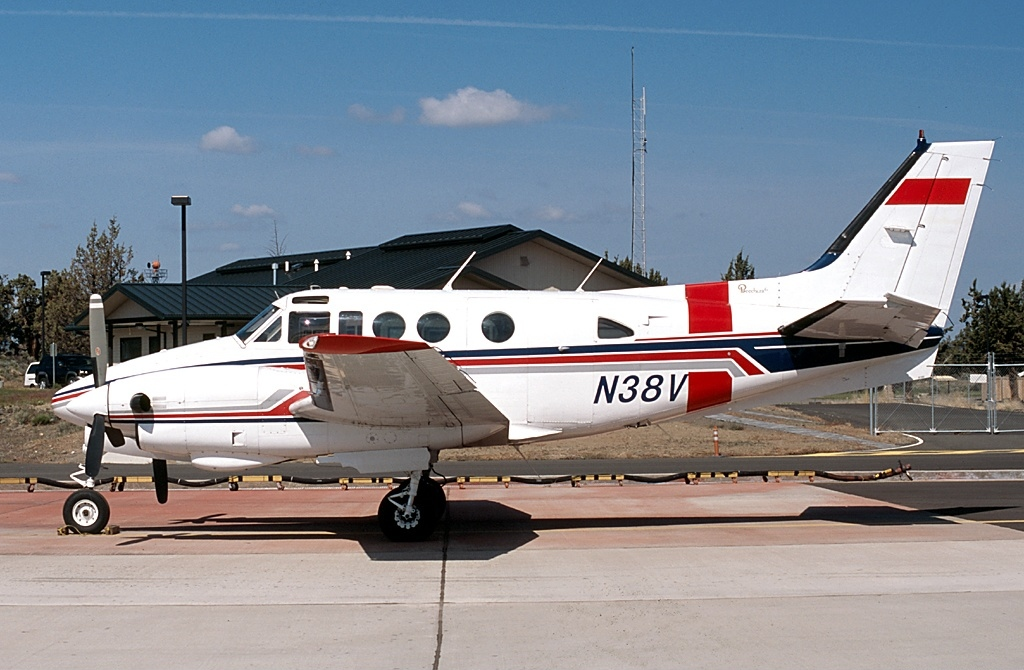
Dynamic Aviation RU-21D operated under lease by the Bureau of Land Management as an aerial firefighting leadplane.

United States

- Dynamic Aviation, acquired most of the US Army's retired U-21 fleet in 1996.
- Science Applications International Corporation, used a single former US Army U-21F as a testbed aircraft.
- United States Army
- United States Navy, used four former US Army U-21Fs in its Naval Test Pilot School between 1996 and 1999.

== Aircraft on display ==
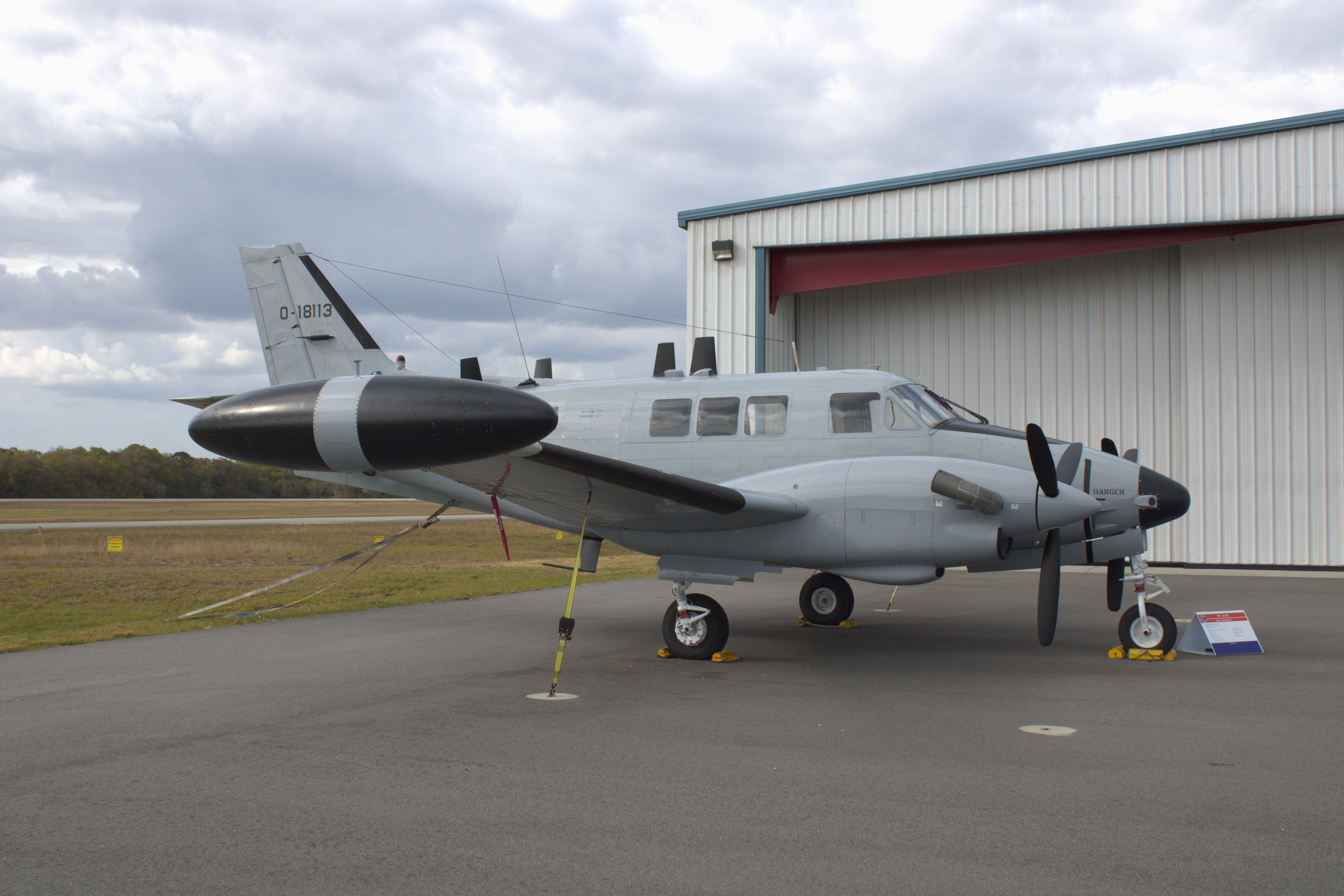
RU-21A s/n 67-18113 on display at the Valiant Air Command Warbird Museum.

- The first production U-21A, construction number LM-1 (US Army serial number 66-18000), is on display at the Beechcraft Heritage Museum in Tullahoma, Tennessee. 66-18000 was one of several aircraft to be converted to EU-21A standard, but like the others eventually reverted back to a U-21A.
- RU-21A serial number 67-18113 is on display at the Valiant Air Command Warbird Museum (VAC) in Titusville, Florida. This aircraft was retired from the US Army in 1993 and sat in a salvage yard in Stapleton, Colorado for about 20 years before being acquired by Dynamic Aviation. Dynamic subsequently donated the aircraft to the 138th Aviation Company Memorial organization, which originally planned to display it alongside the B-52D Stratofortress at Orlando International Airport. However, due to a lack of funds, the aircraft was instead donated to the VAC prior to the completion of restoration.
- JU-21H serial number 70-15888 is on display at the United States Army Aviation Museum at Fort Rucker, Alabama. This was the last U-21 to be retired from US Army service. The YU-21 prototype, serial number 63-12902, was also displayed at the Army Aviation Museum after its retirement in August 1984, but was struck from the museum's collection in 2001.

== Specifications (U-21A) ==
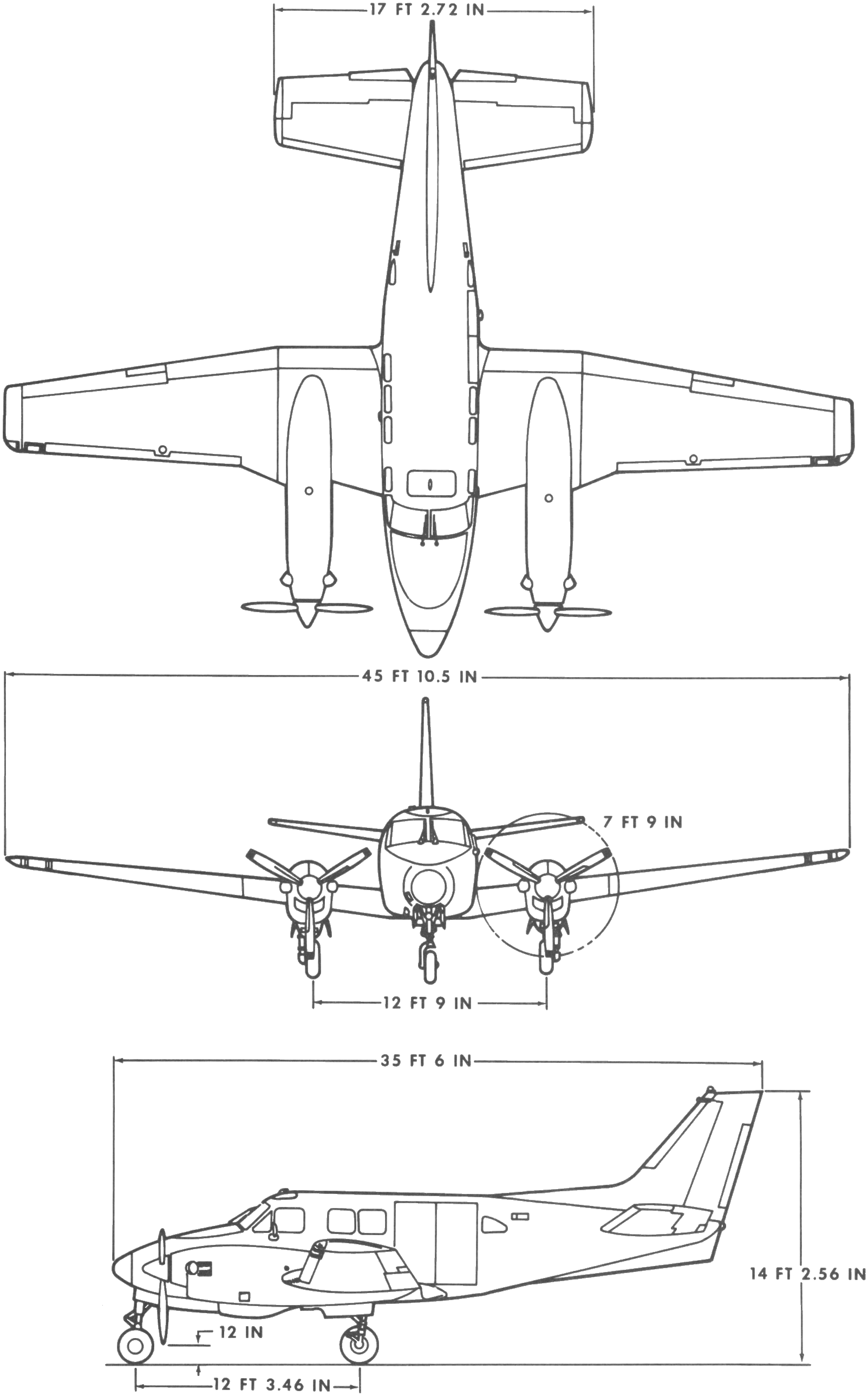
3-view drawing of a U-21A Ute

Data from Jane's All The World's Aircraft 1970-71

General characteristics

- Crew: 2
- Capacity: 10 passengers (troop transport configuration), 6 passengers (staff transport), 3 litter patients plus 3 medical staff (air ambulance), or 3,000 lb (1,360 kg) of cargo
- Length: 35 ft 6 in (10.82 m)
- Wingspan: 45 ft 10.5 in (13.98 m)
- Width: 4 ft 7 in (1.40 m) (cabin)
- Height: 14 ft 2.5 in (4.33 m)
- Wing area: 279.7 sq ft (25.98 m^{2})
- Aspect ratio: 7.51
- Airfoil: Modified NACA 23014.10 (root), modified NACA 23016.22 (center-section/outer panel junction), modified NACA 23012.00 (tip)
- Empty weight: 5,434 lb (2,464 kg)
- Max takeoff weight: 9,650 lb (4,377 kg)
- Fuel capacity: 378 US Gal (1,427 L)
- Powerplant: 2 × Pratt & Whitney Canada T74-CP-700 (PT6A-20) turboprop engines, 550 shp (410 kW) each
- Propellers: 3-bladed Hartzell Model HC-B3TN-3/T10173 reversible constant-speed propellers

Performance

- Maximum speed: 265 mph (426 km/h, 230 kn) true airspeed at 10,000 ft (3,050 m) above sea level
- Cruise speed: 205 mph (328 km/h, 178 kn) true airspeed at 10,000 ft (3,050 m) above sea level
- Stall speed: 92 mph (148.5 km/h, 80 kn) calibrated airspeed with flaps and wheels down
- Never exceed speed: 299 mph (481 km/h, 259 kn) calibrated airspeed
- Range: 1,216 mi (1,956 km, 1,056 nmi) with max payload
- Ferry range: 1,676 mi (2,697 km, 1,455 nmi) with no payload and one pilot
- Service ceiling: 26,150 ft (7,970 m)
- Rate of climb: 2,160 ft/min (10.97 m/s)
- Wing loading: 34.48 lb/sq ft (168.35 kg/m^{2})
- Power/mass: 8.77 lb/shp (3.97 kg/shp)
- Takeoff distance: 1,618 ft (493 m)
- Landing distance: 1,280 ft (390 m)

== See also ==
Related development

- Beechcraft Queen Air
- Beechcraft L-23 Seminole
- Beechcraft King Air
- Beechcraft Super King Air
- Beechcraft C-12 Huron

Related lists

- List of military aircraft of the United States
