= Swearingen =

Swearingen or Swearengin may refer to:

- Swearingen Aircraft, or one of several aircraft manufactured by this company and its successors, including:
  - Swearingen Merlin, a twin turboprop business aircraft
  - Fairchild Swearingen Metroliner, a twin turboprop airliner
  - Sino Swearingen SJ30-2, a business jet
- Other aircraft bearing the Swearingen name:
  - Swearingen SX-300, a homebuilt aircraft kit
- John J. Swearingen House, a historic home in Bartow, Florida
- Van Swearingen-Shepherd House, a historic mansion in Shepherdstown, West Virginia
- Swearengin, Alabama, place

== People with the surname ==
- Ashley Swearengin (born 1972), American politician
- Ed Swearingen (1925–2014), American aeronautical engineer
- Ellis Alfred Swearingen (1845–1904), also known as Al Swearengen, American pimp and saloon owner
- Fred Swearingen, American official in American football
- Henry Swearingen (1790s–1849), American politician from Ohio
- James Swearingen, American composer
- Jay Swearingen, American politician from Missouri
- Judson S. Swearingen (1907–1999), American entrepreneur and inventor
- Ken Swearingen (born c. 1934), American college football player and coach
- Leroy Swearingen, American musician, member of The Stereos
- M. Wesley Swearingen (1927–2019), American law enforcement agent and writer
- Paula Jean Swearengin (born 1974), American activist and politician
- Rob Swearingen (born 1963), American businessman and politician
- Terri Swearingen, American nurse
- Thomas Van Swearingen (1784–1822), American politician from Virginia
- Victor C. Swearingen, American judge, alternate judge in the Doctors' trial
