= Jaffe/Swearingen SA-32T Turbo Trainer =

SA-32T Turbo Trainer

General information
- Type: Training aircraft
- National origin: USA
- Manufacturer: Jaffe Aircraft Corporation/Swearingen Aircraft Corporation
- Designer: Ed Swearingen
- Status: Prototype only
- Number built: 1

History
- First flight: 31 May 1989
- Developed from: Swearingen SX300

The Jaffe/Swearingen SA-32T is a prototype American turboprop- powered training aircraft with side-by-side seating. A single example was built in the late 1980s, but no production followed.

== Design and development ==
The SA-32T was developed by Ed Swearingen from his Swearingen SX-300 piston-engined homebuilt aircraft on behalf of the Jaffe Aircraft Corporation, who hoped to sell it as a relatively low-cost military trainer. The resulting design was a low-wing cantilever monoplane, with a mainly metal structure, but with composite engine cowlings and tips of wings and tails. Skin thicknesses were increased by 50% compared with the SX300 to make the airframe stronger. A laminar flow wing was used, which was claimed to give jet-like handling capabilities, while hardpoints could be fitted to allow weapons to be carried. The pilot and instructor sat side by side under a bubble canopy, with provision for ejector seats to be fitted. It had a retractable nosewheel undercarriage. The prototype was powered by a single Allison 250-B17D turboprop engine driving a three-bladed propeller.

A single prototype was built by Swearingen Aircraft Corporation, making its first flight on 31 May 1989, which was displayed at the Paris Air Show in June that year. The design was offered to the United States Air Force as a replacement for its aging Cessna T-37 Tweet trainers, and to West Germany and Turkey. In 1990, a version with tandem seating rather than the side-by-side seating of the prototype was proposed. Development of the SA-32T had been abandoned by 1992, although as of January 2016, the prototype is still registered as airworthy by the Federal Aviation Administration.

== Specifications (Performance estimated) ==
Data from Jane's All The World's Aircraft 1990–91

General characteristics

- Crew: 2
- Length: 22 ft 6 in (6.86 m)
- Wingspan: 24 ft 4 1/2 in (7.430 m)
- Height: 7 ft 9 1/4 in (2.369 m)
- Wing area: 71.5 sq ft (6.64 m^{2})
- Aspect ratio: 8.3:1
- Airfoil: NASA NLF 0416
- Empty weight: 1,560 lb (708 kg)
- Max takeoff weight: 2,600 lb (1,179 kg)
- Fuel capacity: 87 US gal (72 imp gal; 330 L)
- Powerplant: 1 × Allison 250-B17D turboprop, 420 shp (310 kW)

Performance

- Maximum speed: 332 mph (534 km/h, 289 kn)
- Cruise speed: 315 mph (507 km/h, 274 kn) (75% power)
- Stall speed: 76 mph (122 km/h, 66 kn) (undercarriage and flaps down)
- Never exceed speed: 400 mph (640 km/h, 350 kn)
- Range: 1,105 mi (1,778 km, 960 nmi)
- Service ceiling: 25,000 ft (7,600 m)
- g limits: ± 6g
- Rate of climb: 3,700 ft/min (19 m/s)
