= Trevor Milton =

American businessman, convicted fraudster (born 1982)

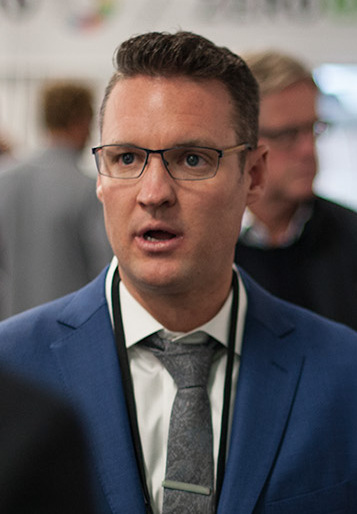
- Milton in 2017
- Born: Trevor Robert Milton; April 6, 1982 (age 44); Layton, Utah, U.S.
- Education: Utah Valley University
- Known for: Founder, former chairman and CEO of Nikola Corporation; CEO of SyberJet Aircraft
- Spouse: Chelsey Bergmann (m. 2018)
- Website: trevormilton.com

Trevor Robert Milton (born April 6, 1982) is an American entrepreneur best known as the founder and former executive chairman and chief executive officer of Nikola Corporation. He later became the chief executive officer of SyberJet Aircraft, a Utah-based aviation company developing business jets.

In 2020, Milton resigned as executive chairman of Nikola following regulatory inquiries. In 2022, he was found guilty of securities and wire fraud. In December 2023, he was sentenced to four years in prison and a US$1 million fine, with restitution to be determined later. In September 2024, a federal judge confirmed a separate civil arbitration award requiring him to pay Nikola about $168 million.

Milton and his wife donated more than $3.2 million to Donald Trump's 2024 presidential campaign and figures in Trump's orbit. In March 2025, he was given a full pardon by President Donald Trump. The pardon prevented the court from ordering the criminal restitution sought by prosecutors, but did not preclude civil lawsuits. In September 2025, the SEC dismissed its civil enforcement action against Milton.

In 2025, he became CEO of SyberJet Aircraft, a Utah-based aviation company developing the SJ30 and SJ36 business jets. The company is staffed by dozens of former Nikola Corporation employees.

== Early life ==
Milton was born in Layton, Utah, to William L. Milton, a manager at Union Pacific Railroad, and Sallie Gwyn Hunt Milton, a realtor. He has one brother named Travis Milton and three sisters. His family moved to Las Vegas when Milton was a toddler and later relocated to Kanab, Utah, when he was eight. When he was 15, his mother died from cancer.

Milton is a member of the Church of Jesus Christ of Latter-day Saints (LDS). After graduating high school, he went on an LDS mission to Brazil, where he learned to speak Portuguese. He returned early after 18 months due to health issues. He later enrolled at Utah Valley University but dropped out after one semester and then moved to the city of St. George.

== Career ==
After leaving college, Milton started an alarm sales company called St. George Security and Alarm. He eventually exited the business and founded an alternative energy vehicle company called dHybrid, Inc. which retrofitted commercial trucks with engines that could run on natural gas instead of diesel. Disputes with investors eventually led to the dissolution of dHybrid, after which Milton launched dHybrid Systems in 2012. This company focused on natural gas storage systems for heavy-duty trucks and was later acquired by Worthington Industries.

In 2015, Milton founded Nikola Motor Company in Salt Lake City, initially known as Bluegentech, with an initial investment of $2 million from Worthington Industries. Inspired by Nikola Tesla, Milton aimed to revolutionize the commercial trucking industry by developing hydrogen-electric and battery-electric semi-trucks to provide sustainable and zero-emission alternatives to traditional diesel-powered vehicles. The company was rebranded as Nikola Motor Company to reflect this vision and Milton served as the CEO in Nikola's early years. Nikola introduced several prototype models, including the Nikola One, a hydrogen-electric semi-truck designed for long-haul transportation. The company later expanded its lineup to include models such as the Nikola Two, targeted at regional transport, and the Nikola Tre, developed in collaboration with European partner Iveco to cater to the European market. In addition to vehicle development, Milton led a plan to establish a nationwide network of hydrogen fuelling stations in collaboration with Nel Hydrogen.

In 2020, Nikola went public through a reverse merger with VectoIQ, a special purpose acquisition company (SPAC), achieving a valuation of approximately $12 billion. Following the merger, Milton became executive chairman of the board and turned over the CEO role to Mark Russell. By June 2020, the shares had more than doubled in selling price since they began trading, as investors continued to bet on the growth potential of electric transportation. At its peak in June 2020, Nikola's market capitalization reached nearly $30 billion, briefly surpassing Ford, which elevated Milton's net worth to approximately $12 billion, given his ownership stake.

On September 10, 2020, two days after Nikola established ties with General Motors, short seller Hindenburg Research released a report accusing Milton of making false statements and calling Nikola "an intricate fraud." Following the report, Nikola’s stock price fell, and the U.S. Securities and Exchange Commission (SEC) and Department of Justice (DOJ) launched investigations into securities fraud allegations involving Milton. On September 20, 2020, Milton resigned from his position as executive chairman of Nikola Corporation. As part of his exit package, he remained an unpaid consultant to Nikola until December 2020 and was restricted from publicly commenting on Nikola without prior approval. Milton retained 91.6 million shares of Nikola, valued at approximately $3.1 billion in late September 2020.

In July 2021, a United States federal grand jury returned an indictment against Trevor Milton that included three counts of securities fraud and wire fraud. He also faced civil securities fraud charges from the SEC. Milton pleaded not guilty to the charges and was freed on $100 million bail. In June 2022, Milton was charged with an additional wire fraud charge. In October 2022, he was found guilty on one count of securities fraud and two counts of wire fraud . In December 2023, he was sentenced to four years in prison and a $1 million fine, with restitution to be determined later. In September 2024, a federal judge confirmed a separate civil arbitration award requiring him to pay Nikola about $168 million.

In his court case, Milton was represented by Marc Mukasey and Brad Bondi.

A month prior to the 2024 presidential election, Milton and his wife donated more than $1.8 million to a fund supporting Donald Trump's reelection.

In 2025, after Hindenburg Research announced its closure, Milton criticized the firm's impact on companies like Nikola, stating that its reports could destroy businesses regardless of their accuracy and proposing that the United States make short selling illegal.

On February 19, 2025, Nikola Corporation filed for Chapter 11 bankruptcy protection, stating that it would seek to sell off all or most of its assets.

On March 27, 2025, he was given a full pardon by President Donald Trump. The pardon prevented the court from ordering the criminal restitution sought by prosecutors, but did not preclude civil lawsuits. Reuters reported that Robert F. Kennedy Jr. had lobbied Trump to pardon Milton.

In October 2025, it was announced that Milton had acquired SyberJet Aircraft, a private‑jet manufacturer, and assumed the role of chief executive officer. He introduced plans for SyberJet's new SJ36 light jet and stated his intent to bring key engineering talent from his previous ventures to support the program.

In August 2026, Milton was a passenger aboard a SyberJet SJ30-2 flight which SyberJet said set an east-to-west transcontinental speed record for the plane's weight class, pending verification.

=== Sexual misconduct claims ===
In September 2020, allegations of sexual misconduct against Milton were reported by media outlets, including CNBC and The Wall Street Journal. In 2022, FOX 13 reported that the statute of limitations had expired in some of the reported cases and that Milton had never been charged. Milton has denied all allegations, describing them as unfounded and defamatory. The accusations coincided with ongoing scrutiny surrounding his tenure at Nikola Corporation.

== Personal life ==
Milton lives in Phoenix, Arizona with his wife, Chelsey Bergmann, whom he married in 2017. In November 2019, the Los Angeles Times reported that Milton had bought a 2,000-acre Utah ranch with a 16,800 square foot riverside mansion for $32.5 million. The purchase price set a new record for a home in the state. He is friends with Dave "Heavy D" Sparks.

In September 2020, Forbes assessed Milton's net worth to be at least $3.1 billion, as he owned about 25% of Nikola, which was valued at about $12.4 billion at the time.

Since 2016, Milton has contributed $2.85 million to conservative political causes. He also contributed $750,000 to the MAHA Alliance, a PAC to convince supporters of Robert F. Kennedy Jr. to support Donald Trump after Kennedy dropped out of the 2024 presidential campaign.

In August 2020, Milton announced that he would transfer 6,005,162 of his personal shares, valued at approximately $233 million, to 50 early Nikola employees as a gesture of appreciation for their contributions to the company.

According to a receipt later filed by his lawyers, in December 2020 Milton donated 1.5 million Nikola shares, valued at about $23.9 million at the time, to The Church of Jesus Christ of Latter-day Saints (LDS Church).

== See also ==
- List of people granted executive clemency in the second Trump presidency
