= SX-300 =

SX 300 or SX-300 may refer to:

- Swearingen SX-300, an aircraft
- SX 300 (superalloy), a superalloy variation of Inconel
