= Nikola Corporation =

Defunct American hydrogen and battery-electric vehicle company

- Formerly: Nikola Motor Company (1996; now name of a subsidiary of Nikola Corporation)
- Type: Public
- Traded as: OTCID Basic: NKLAQ
- ISIN: US6541101050
- Industry: Automotive
- Founded: 2014; 12 years ago Salt Lake City, Utah
- Founder: Trevor Milton
- Headquarters: Phoenix, Arizona, U.S.
- Key people: Steve Shindler, Chairman; Steve Girsky (CEO)
- Products: Nikola Two; Nikola Tre; Nikola One; Nikola Badger; Nikola NZT; Nikola Reckless; Nikola WAV
- Revenue: ▲US$50.8 million (2022)
- Operating income: ▼ −US$749 million (2022)
- Net income: ▼ −US$784 million (2022)
- Total assets: ▲US$1.24 billion (2022)
- Total equity: ▼US$526 million (2022)
- Number of employees: 970 (July, 2023)
- Subsidiaries: Nikola Motor Company; Nikola Energy Company
- Website: nikolamotor.com

Nikola Corporation (formerly known as Nikola Motor Company) was an American manufacturer of heavy-duty commercial battery-electric vehicles and fuel-cell electric vehicles, headquartered in Phoenix, Arizona. Founded in 2014 by Trevor Milton, the company went public in June 2020. The company was named after Nikola Tesla.

In September 2020, the Securities and Exchange Commission and the Department of Justice launched investigations into securities fraud allegations. In July 2021, a United States federal grand jury indicted Nikola founder and former CEO Trevor Milton, but did not indict the company. The indictment charged Milton with three counts of criminal fraud and two counts of securities fraud. Publicly traded shares in Nikola dropped to around US$12 after falling from over $65 in mid-2020, when its market valuation had exceeded that of the Ford Motor Company.

On February 19, 2025, Nikola filed for Chapter 11 bankruptcy protection, stating that it would seek to sell off all or most of its assets. Gordon Brothers offered for sale over 100 Nikola trucks, hydrogen business machinery and inventory products.

== History ==
=== Founding (2014-2019) ===
Nikola Corporation was founded by Trevor Milton in 2014 in Salt Lake City, Utah.

As of 2016, the first 5,000 Nikola One hydrogen-powered glider trucks (truck vehicle platforms without engines) were slated to be built by Fitzgerald Glider Kits in Tennessee. In March 2019, Nikola acquired a 389-acre parcel of land in Coolidge, Arizona, for $23 million, with future state and local tax breaks. Nikola said in 2019 that they expected truck factory construction to start in 2020, truck construction in 2021, and the fabrication of 35–50,000 trucks per year by 2023.

In February 2019, Mark Russell was hired as company president. Russell had most recently been president and CEO of Nikola Corporation's investor, Worthington Industries.

In April 2019, Nikola held the Nikola World event in Scottsdale, Arizona. The two-day midweek event included a public demo day to show off the Nikola Two truck, the Nikola Tre truck, the Nikola NZT UTV, and the Nikola WAV watercraft.

=== Going public (2020) ===
In March 2020, Nikola Corporation announced its plans to merge with VectoIQ Acquisition Corporation (ticker VTIQ), a publicly traded special-purpose acquisition company run by former General Motors (GM) vice-chairman and Stephen Girsky. This resulted in the combined company being listed on the NASDAQ exchange with the NKLA ticker symbol. As part of the merger, founder and CEO Trevor Milton had his title changed from CEO to Executive Chairman and Nikola President Mark Russell became president and CEO. Nikola's stock began trading on June 4, 2020, a day after the merger was completed. On June 8, Nikola's shares more than doubled in a single day. At the end of June, Nikola started taking reservations for pickup truck, the Badger, even though a prototype had not been shown to the public.

The company was valued at around $13 billion in early August 2020, compared to its revenue in the first six months of 2020 of $80,000 ($36,000 of which was attributed to installation of solar facilities for CEO Milton).

On September 8, 2020, Nikola and GM announced a partnership, by which GM would acquire an 11% stake in Nikola (valued at approximately $2 billion at the time of the announcement). GM would also earn the right to nominate one member to Nikola's board. In return, GM agreed to use its manufacturing facilities to begin production of the Badger, as well as supply fuel cells and batteries to Nikola globally. Nikola stock jumped by 50% after the announcement.

=== Fraud allegations and guilty verdict (2020–2022) ===
On September 10, 2020, short seller firm Hindenburg Research released a report accusing Nikola of being "an intricate fraud" perpetrated largely by Milton. Further verification by the Financial Times and Ars Technica confirmed the report's claim regarding a showcased Nikola One rolling down a gradual slope with no onboard propulsion and instead by using the force of gravity. The stock fell by 10% that day while the stock of GM, which had made an agreement with Nikola days earlier, fell by 4%. By September 12, Nikola stock had fallen by 36%.

Nikola called these claims "false and misleading" and threatened legal action against Hindenburg. The US Attorney's Office for the Southern District of New York showed interest in the report. Previously, Milton had alleged that those who were short-selling Nikola stocks are fans of rival company Tesla and are "anti-Nikola or paid attack accounts". In response to the release of the Hindenburg report, Mary Barra, CEO of GM, said her company conducted appropriate diligence before its deal with Nikola. Reports that became public on September 14 stated that the Securities and Exchange Commission had started a probe into the fraud allegations and on September 15, the Department of Justice began an investigation into Nikola as well.

On September 21, 2020, Executive Chairman, founder and former CEO Trevor Milton announced his resignation from Nikola, and Stephen Girsky became non-executive chairman of the board. News of the allegations caused the share price of Nikola Corp to drop by 20%. Following the resignation, Nikola then "issued copyright-takedown notices targeting critics on YouTube who [citing fair use] used clips of the promotional video in which a Nikola One semi-truck was seen rolling down a hill" without a working drivetrain. The Drive called Nikola's action an "abuse of YouTube's copyright takedown system".

On September 23, BP backed away from a potential partnership to develop hydrogen refueling stations for Nikola's EV Trucks; Nikola's stock price fell by more than 25% intraday after BP's statement. The partnership was cited as a critical component in Nikola's business plan for its electric vehicle trucks powered by hydrogen fuel cells. Nikola had planned to announce the BP partnership days after the GM partnership.

In November 2020, GM announced that the proposed deal to take an equity stake in Nikola would no longer occur. A revised deal was proposed, having GM provide Nikola with the promised fuel-cell technology, but leaving out the 11% stake in the company as well as no longer producing the Badger electric pickup truck for the company. The Badger was subsequently cancelled.

In December 2020, Republic Services stated that their previously announced partnership with Nikola would be terminated. The two companies had agreed to jointly develop zero-emissions garbage trucks in August 2020, including the production of at least 2,500 to 5,000 trucks for the Republic Services fleet by the start of 2023. Nikola's shares fell 9.8% after the announcement was released. Analysts call the cancelled order a short-term setback, allowing the company to channel more focus towards the core of the business, being the production of semi-trucks designed for long-haul transport.

In February 2021, the company publicly dropped their Powersports unit along with any plans they previously had to produce any of the powersports concept vehicles they had shown, including the Nikola WAV watersports vehicle. Also in February, as part of YE2020 filings with the SEC, the company stated that they now intended to produce just 50-100 Nikola Tre vehicles in 4Q2021. In June 2021, Nikola invested $50 million in a new hydrogen factory headed by Wabash Valley Resources to produce fuel for semi-truck fuel stations across the Midwest. In July 2021, the company announced five new independent Class 8 truck dealers with more than 51 locations in Arizona, Texas, Colorado, California, New Mexico, Delaware, Florida, Maryland and Virginia. In late July 2021, a United States federal grand jury returned an indictment against Trevor Milton that included three counts of criminal fraud, including "lying about 'nearly all aspects of the business'" and two counts of securities fraud. Milton pleaded not guilty to the charges and was freed on $100 million bail, secured by two Utah properties. Nikola's share price dropped further and traded at $12 after falling from near $65 in June 2020, when Nikola had a company valuation in excess of the Ford Motor Company.

Following the indictment of Milton in July 2021, the company stated "We remain committed to our previously announced milestones and timelines and are focused on delivering Nikola Tre battery-electric trucks later this year from the company's manufacturing facilities." In October 2022, Milton was found guilty in federal court of three of four counts of fraud against him, over statements he made while CEO of the company. On December 18, 2023, he was sentenced to four years in prison.

On March 27, 2025, Milton was fully pardoned by President Donald Trump.

=== 2022–present ===
In August 2022, Nikola announced that it would be acquiring the battery company Romeo Power. On August 4, 2022, it was reported that Nikola had delivered 48 vehicles to dealers, and reported a revenue of $18.1 million. In September 2022, all 93 of its Tre Class 8 battery-electric vehicles were recalled due to an issue with seat belt anchor assemblies. Nikola published in October 2022 that they had completed the acquisition of Romeo and "look forward to executing on the opportunities ahead."

In June 2023, a Nikola truck caught fire at its headquarters due to a coolant leak inside its battery pack. In August 2023, a second truck's battery pack malfunctioned, which led the company to announce a recall of all the battery-electric semitrucks it had made to that point (209 in total). It suspended sales of its battery-electric trucks until a repair would become available. On September 4, 2023 a third truck caught fire at Arizona Lithium in Tempe, Arizona, and on September 8, a fourth truck fire occurred near Nikola's headquarters in Phoenix.

Nikola sold 112 hydrogen fuel cell trucks in the first half of 2024. In May 2024, Nikola said its HYLA hydrogen brand aimed to have 14 refueling sites operating by the end of the year.

In February 2025, Nikola filed for federal bankruptcy. By then, shares for the company were valued at 44 cents each, and the company had somewhere between $1 billion to $10 billion in debt, as opposed to only $500 million to $1 billion in assets. After the bankruptcy, some fleet customers, such as IMC Logistics, kept their Nikola fuel cell trucks running despite higher fuel costs.

As of July 2025, Nikola's truck customers were making contingency plans while awaiting the outcome of the bankruptcy, amid concern that the case could convert to a Chapter 7 liquidation.

Lucid Motors has acquired select facilities and assets previously belonging to Nikola Corporation, subject to approval by the U.S. Bankruptcy Court for the District of Delaware. The acquisition does not include Nikola's business, customer base, or technology related to Nikola's hydrogen fuel cell electric trucks. Lucid plans to offer employment to more than 300 former Nikola employees in various roles across Lucid's Arizona facilities. The acquisition adds over 884,000 square feet to Lucid's Arizona footprint, including manufacturing and warehousing buildings and battery and environmental testing facilities.

At Nikola's bankruptcy auction in August 2025, Hyroad Energy agreed to buy 113 Nikola hydrogen fuel cell trucks, along with much of the company's remaining physical assets and all of its intellectual property, for $3.85 million, and planned to deploy the trucks primarily in California.

== Concept vehicles ==
Nikola publicly announced a number of vehicle design concepts since 2016 and unveiled a few concept vehicles that the company aimed to develop for public sale.

=== Nikola One ===
In 2016, the company unveiled a high-level design for a natural gas fueled Class 8 truck called the Nikola One, aimed then to be in production in 2020. The concept was changed in August 2016 to a hydrogen fuel-cell powered generator instead of a natural gas fueled gas-turbine generator. In 2016 Nikola claimed to have received $2.3 billion in pre-sales.

In May 2018, Nikola Motor Company filed a lawsuit against Tesla, Inc. seeking $2 billion in damages alleging that the Tesla Semi infringed on six patents that Nikola has been granted on the design of the Nikola One. Tesla responded that the lawsuit is without merit. In September 2019, the Patent Trial and Appeal Board denied Tesla's request to invalidate Nikola's side-door patent. Nikola’s suit prompted a countersuit by Tesla. As part of a settlement agreement, the two companies agreed to drop their suits against each other.

In May 2018, Anheuser-Busch placed a provisional purchase order for up to 800 leases of the hydrogen-powered truck versions, and Nikola claimed then that the trucks would start being delivered in 2020. By 2019, total pre-orders for truck leases encompassing all Nikola Class 8 truck models were claimed to be worth $14 billion.

=== Nikola Two ===
The Nikola Two is a semi-tractor truck concept designed to be technically identical to the Nikola One. Unlike the Nikola One, a prototype driving under its own power was demonstrated in 2019, including when hauling a cargo of beer for a future customer.

=== Nikola Tre ===
In November 2018, the company unveiled a Nikola Tre hydrogen-powered semi-truck concept aimed at the European market. The hydrogen ICE Tre was also stated to be targeted for the Australian and Asian markets. Nikola said the Tre concept was to have 500 to 1,000 horsepower (370 to 750 kW) and a range of 310 to 750 miles (500 to 1,200 km). Then CEO Trevor Milton stated in 2018 that production was planned to begin at the same time as the US truck versions, which was then thought to be 2022–2023.

In November 2019, the company unveiled a Nikola Tre electric truck concept (a rebadged version of the Iveco S-Way) that would also be aimed at the European market, just as the original hydrogen Tre had been. In July 2021, the company restated that they intend to deliver the first production Nikola Tre battery electric trucks later in 2021. The Tre was delivered to the Port of Los Angeles in December 2021. It has a 753 kWh battery pack, rechargeable from 10 to 80% in 120 minutes at 240 kW. California qualified the Tre for its HVIP program in January 2022 at up to $120,000, and New York at up to $185,000.

The first customer delivery of the Nikola Tre was made in April 2022, with 11 vehicles being delivered.

At the end of 2023, Nikola had delivered 209 units of the Nikola Tre, however all delivered units were subjected to a recall due to a potential leak in the coolant circuit of the battery pack. Following the recall, by October 2024, 78 of those 209 delivered Nikola Tre units were back on the road.

=== Nikola NZT (Nikola Zero) ===
In 2016, a prototype concept, the Nikola NZT (originally - and briefly - referred to as the Nikola Zero) was unveiled as a utility task vehicle with a 72 or 107 kWh battery. The concept was stated to have 555 horsepower (414 kW) total, provided by a motor at each wheel, weigh 3,500 lb (1,600 kg), and use the same 14.5 in (370 mm) clearance suspension as the Ford Raptor.

In 2017 Nikola took a journalist for a ride-along in a prototype of the car in a Utah desert to demonstrate the vehicle's capabilities. That was an open-cabin version, lacking doors or a windshield. On April 16, 2019, Nikola presented an NZT in Phoenix, Arizona, that appeared similar to the original one, except it had doors (but still lacked a roof and a windshield). Nikola says it offered rides in this vehicle to the attendees during the event, and published a video claiming to show it. The vehicle was supposed to have 590 horsepower (440 kW), and up to 150 miles (240 km) of range per electric charge. The vehicle was cancelled, alongside the rest of the powersports division, in February 2021.

=== Nikola Reckless ===
The Nikola Reckless was a concept vehicle that was projected to be a military grade fully-electric tactical off-highway vehicle. A prototype of the vehicle was displayed in the International Special Operations Forces Industry Exhibition Conference in May 2018.

The vehicle's chassis would be 4×4 although it could switch to two-wheel drive. It would weigh 2,299 pounds (1,043 kg) and would be able to carry up to 1,400 pounds (635 kg). Also, the vehicle would have a 0.50-inch (12.7 mm) machine gun.

=== Nikola WAV ===
The Nikola WAV was a concept vehicle unveiled in April 2019 as a Nikola Motors watersports offering and presented alongside the Nikola Zero. The Nikola WAV concept had a 12-inch (30 cm) waterproof 4K resolution screen, and cruise control. The vehicle was cancelled, alongside the entire powersports division, in February 2021.

=== Nikola Badger ===
The Badger was a proposed electric pickup truck announced in February 2020. Nikola planned two variants, the first powered by a combination of hydrogen fuel cells and batteries and second all-electric, without fuel cells. The truck was intended to go to market in 2022 with the assistance of GM. In November 2020, GM pulled out of the deal and Nikola cancelled the truck.

== Gallery ==
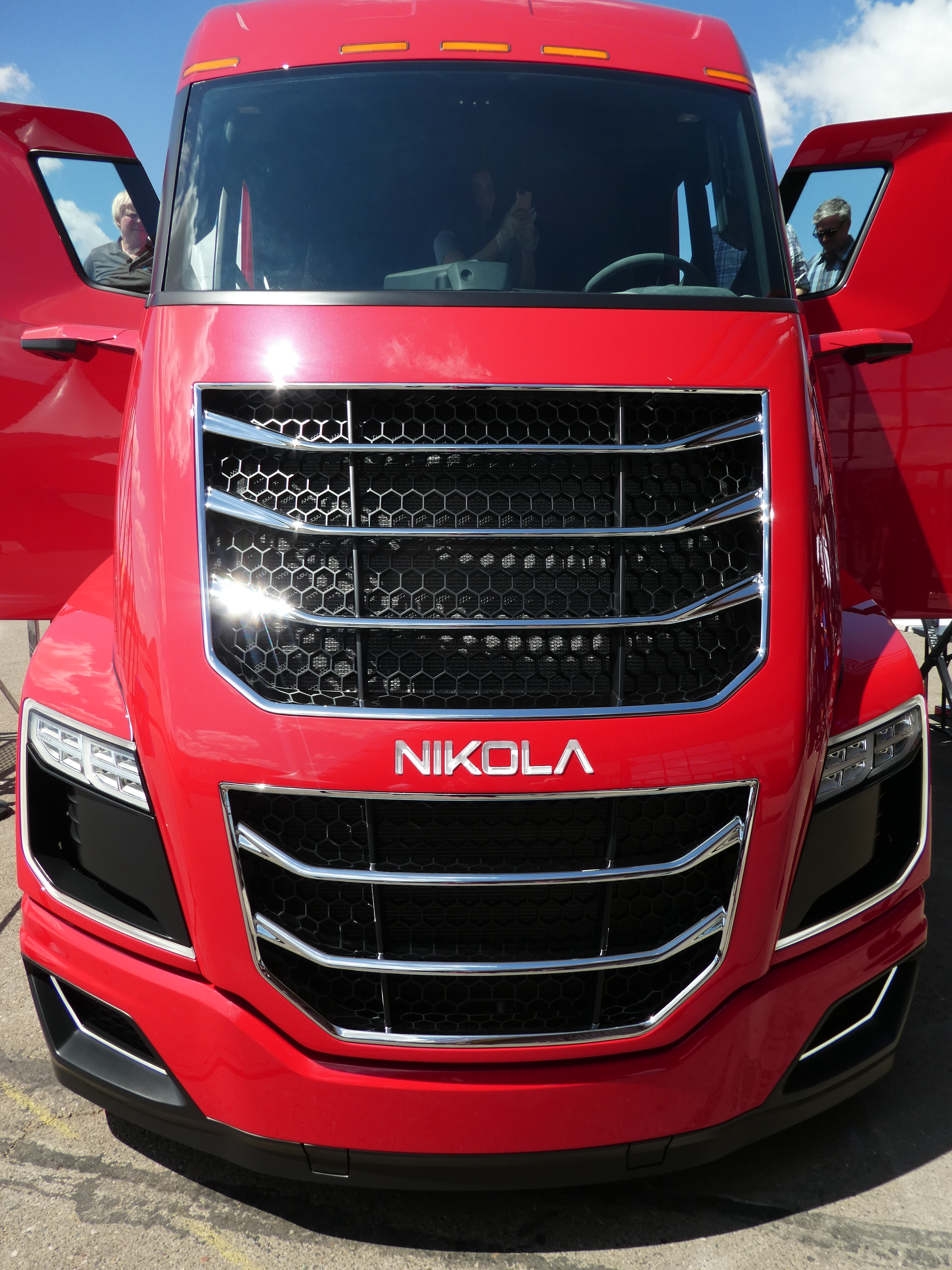
Nikola Two

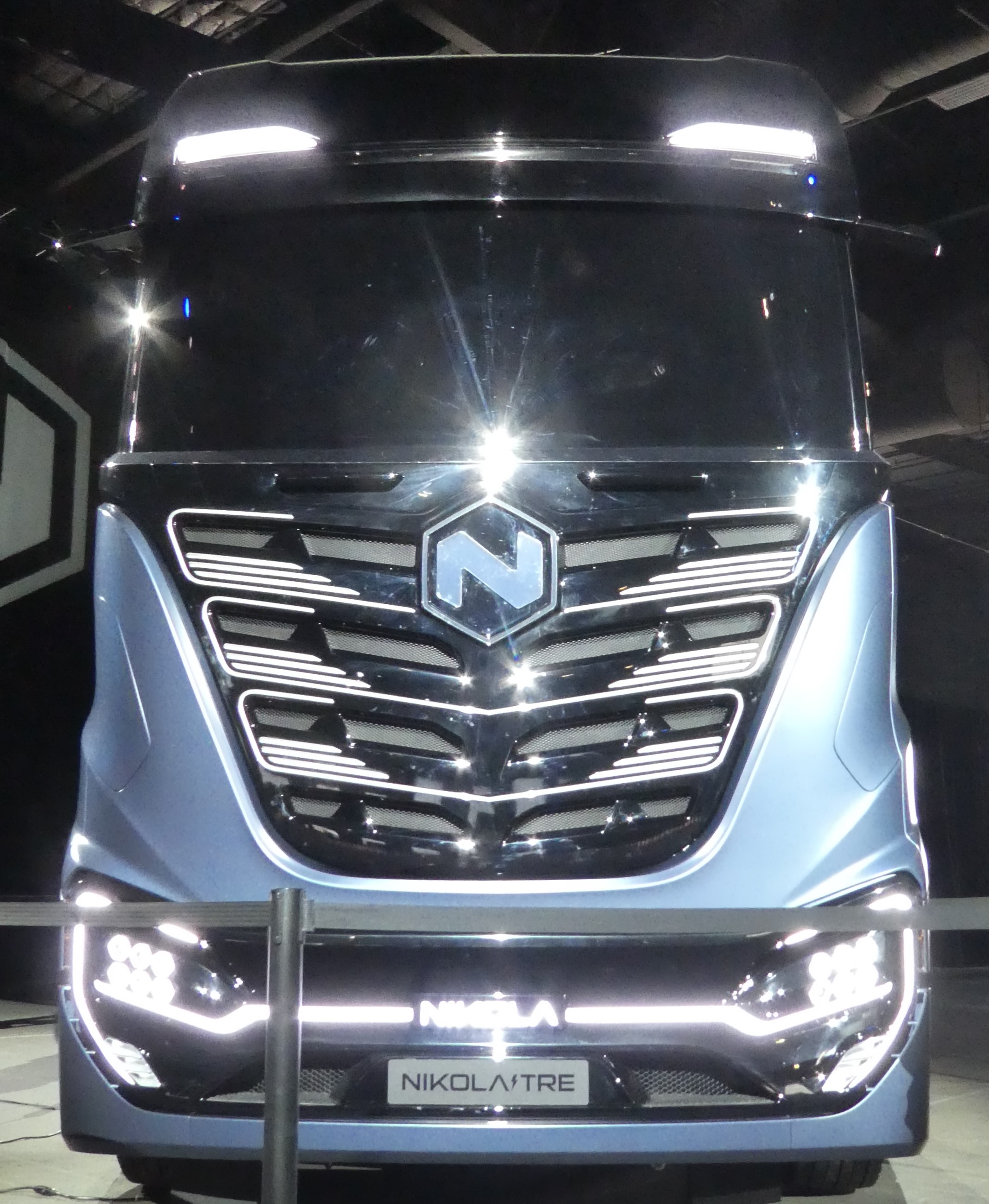
Nikola Tre

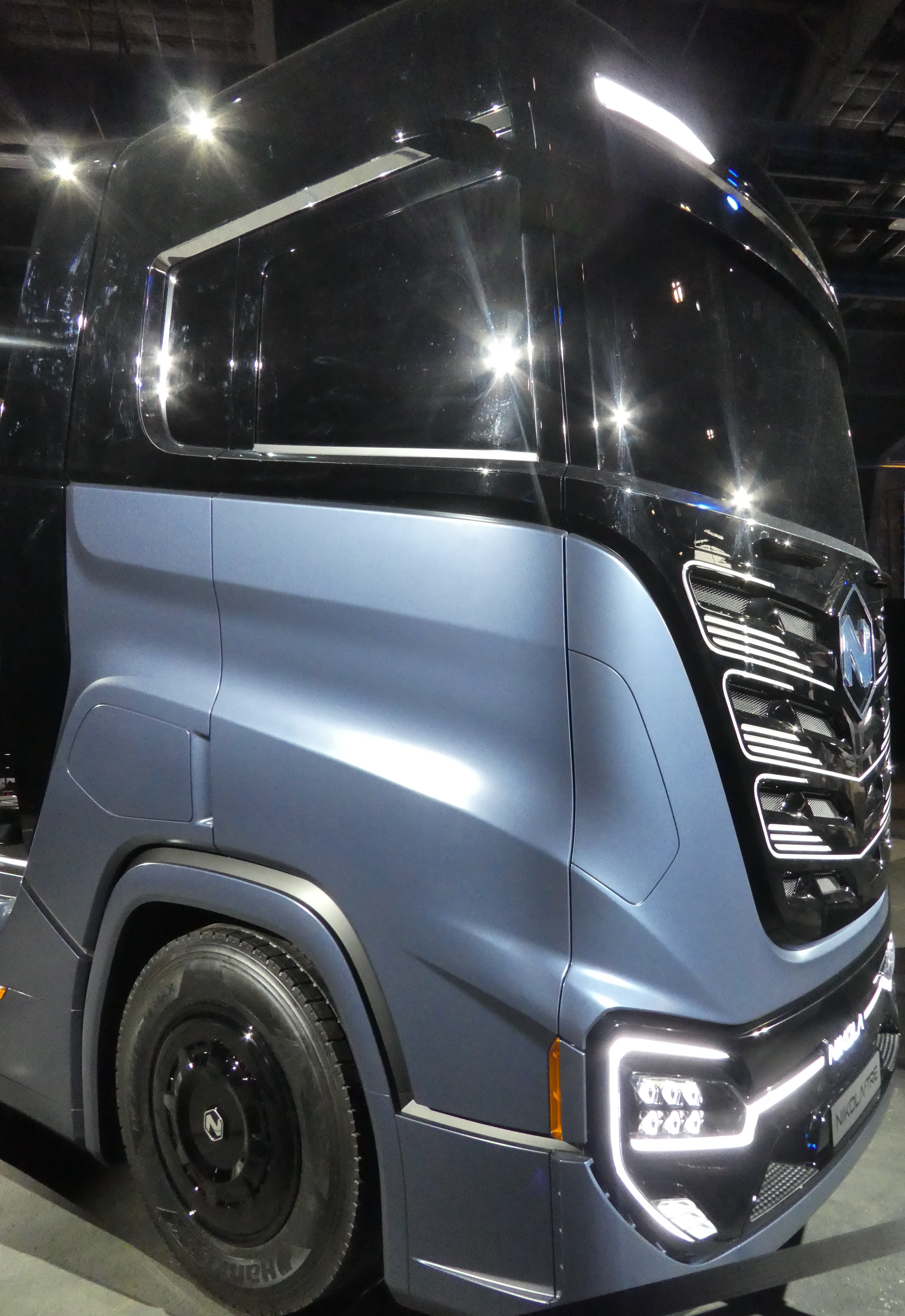
Nikola Tre, side view

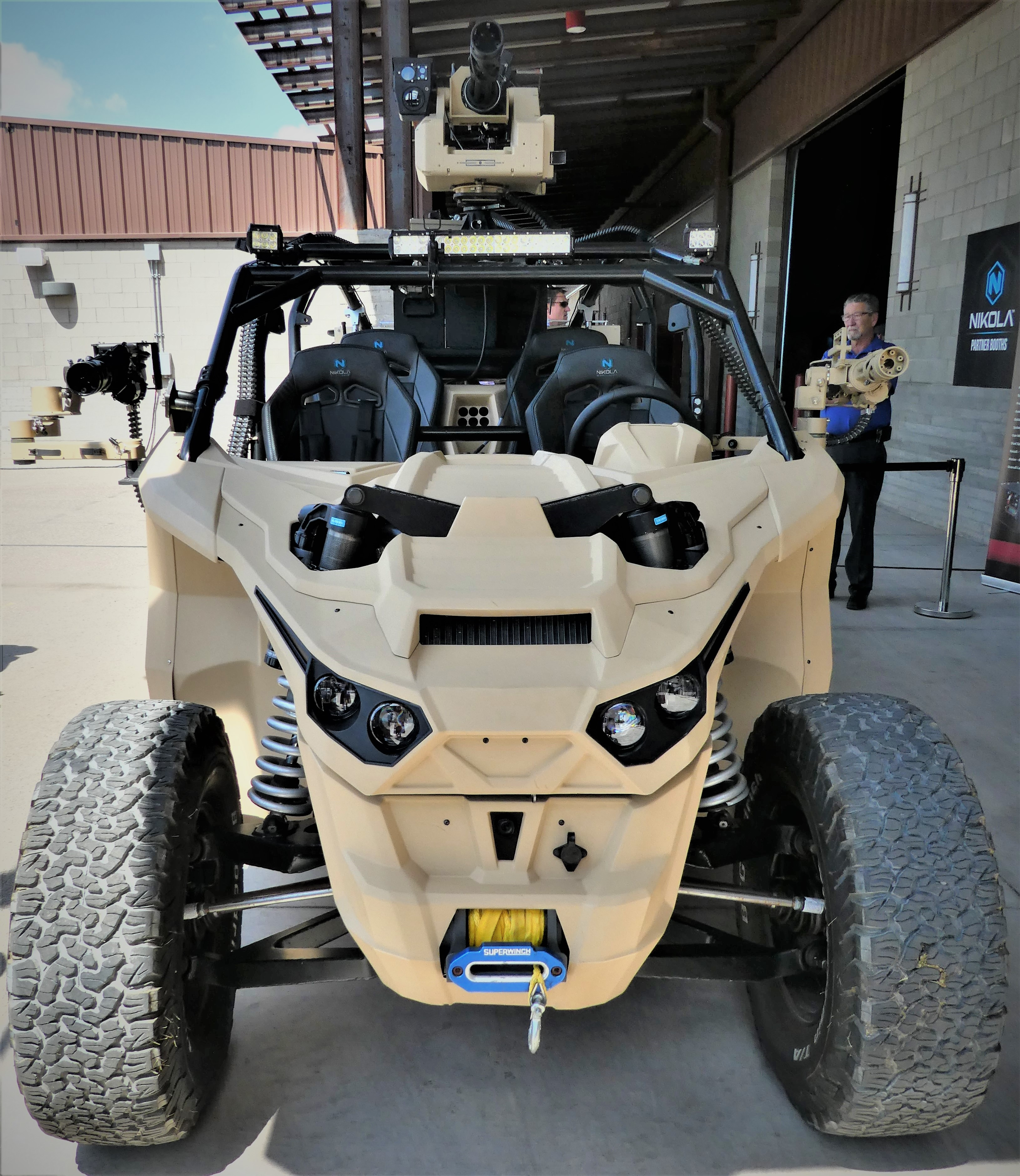
Nikola Reckless

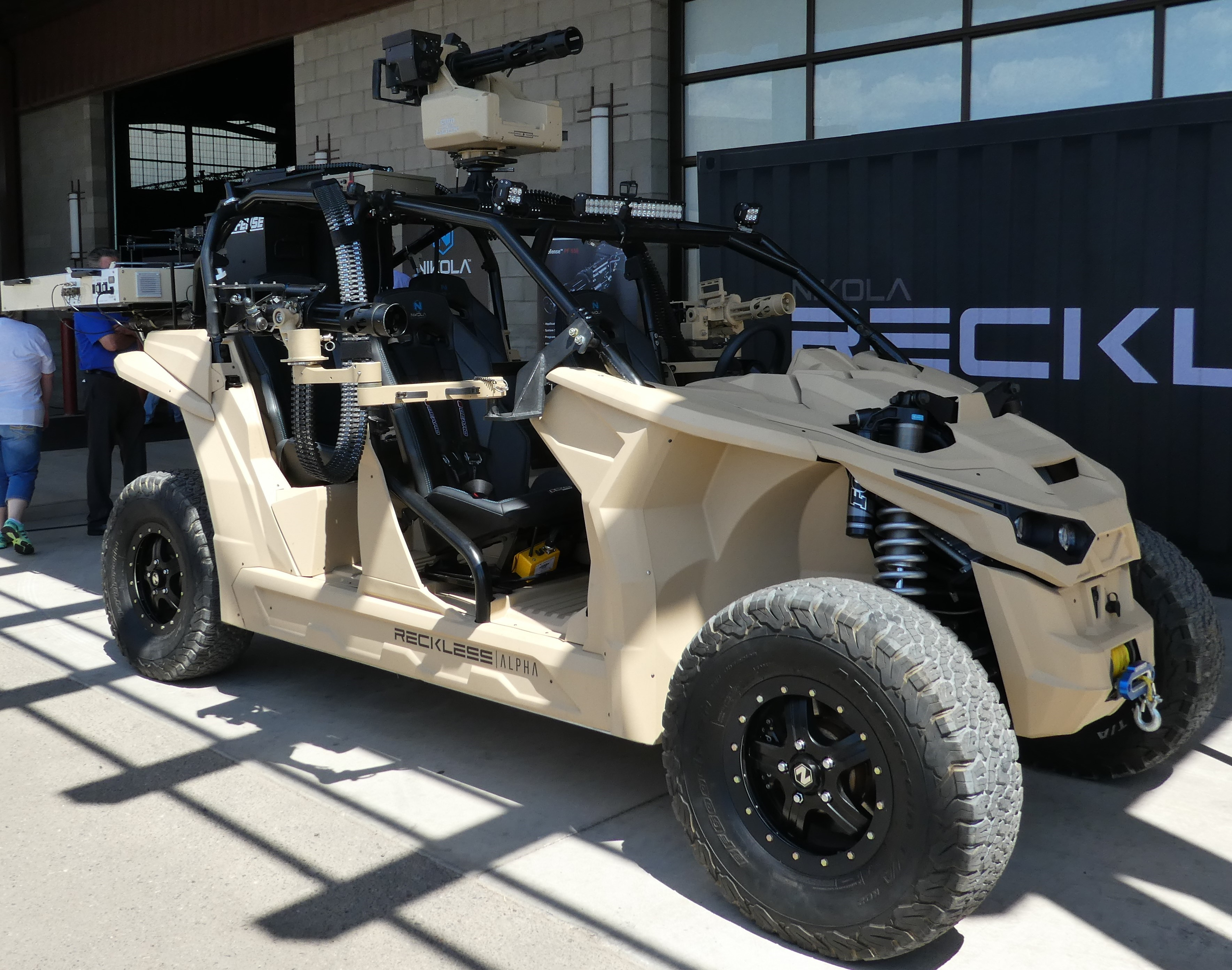
Nikola Reckless, side view

== See also ==
- Cummins Aeos, a battery-electric and diesel range extender Class 7 semi truck tractor unit
- Hyundai Xcient, a fuel cell Class 8 truck
- Lordstown Motors, an American company which has announced an all-electric pickup truck
- Rivian, an American company which has sold an all-electric pickup truck since late 2021
- Tesla, Inc, an American company (also named after Nikola Tesla) that is manufacturing all-electric vehicles including a semi-trailer truck
- Toyota Project Portal, a fuel cell Class 8 truck
