= Swearingen Merlin =

Type of Aircraft

Merlin
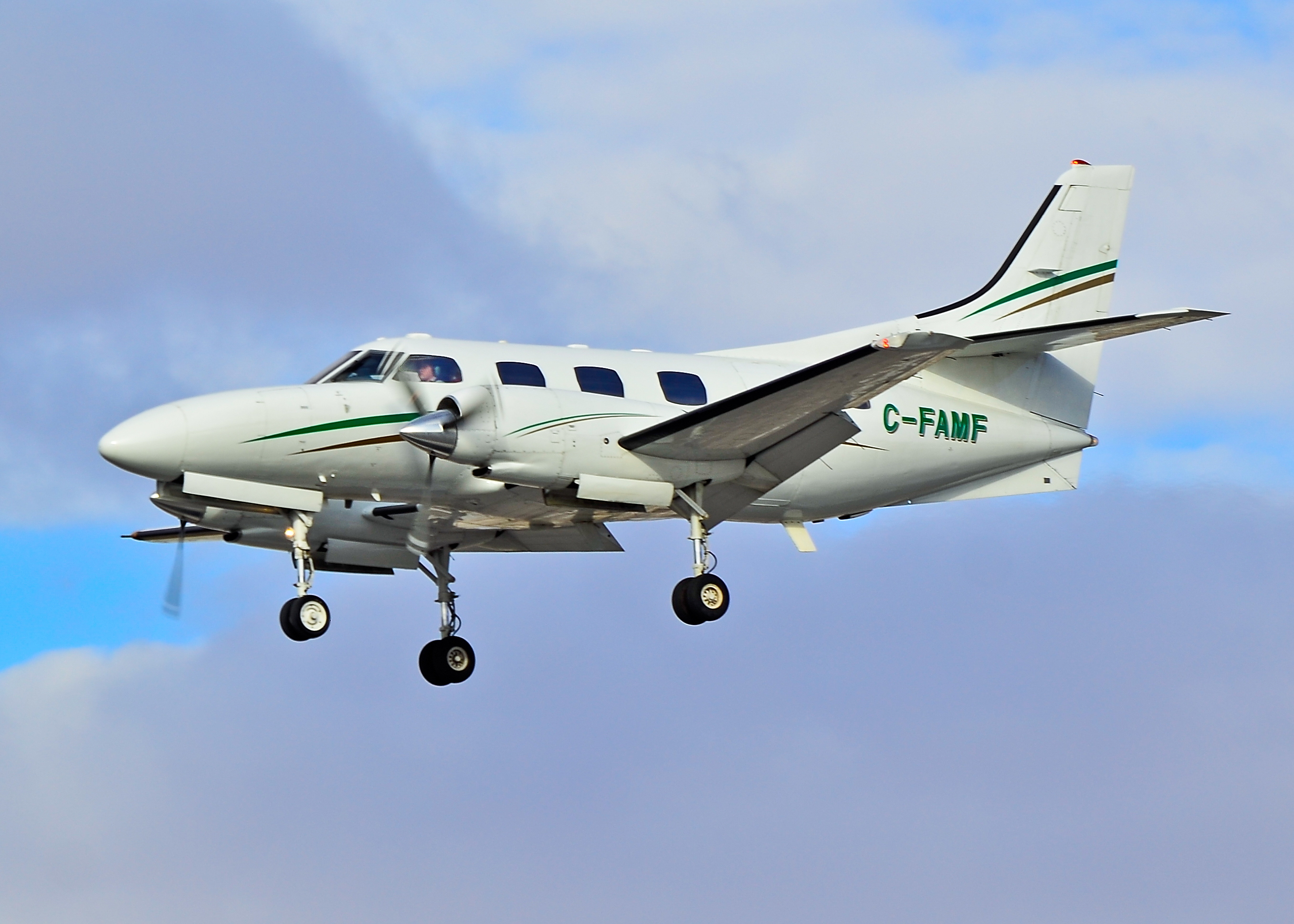
- The Merlin is a low-wing, twin turboprop light utility aircraft with retractable gear

General information
- Type: business aircraft
- Manufacturer: Swearingen; Fairchild Aircraft
- Designer: Ed Swearingen; John T. Jennings
- Status: Out of production, in service

History
- Manufactured: 1965-1998
- First flight: 13 April 1965
- Developed into: Fairchild Swearingen Metroliner; C-26 Metroliner

The Swearingen Merlin or the Fairchild Aerospace Merlin is a pressurized, twin turboprop business aircraft first produced by Swearingen Aircraft, and later by Fairchild at a plant in San Antonio, Texas.

== Development ==
The Merlin was an evolution of earlier modification programs performed by Swearingen Aircraft. Ed Swearingen started the developments that led to the Merlin through gradual modifications to the Beechcraft Twin Bonanza and Queen Air business aircraft which he dubbed Excalibur. Then a hybrid aircraft was developed, with a new fuselage and vertical fin, mated to salvaged and modified (wet) Queen Air wings and horizontal tails, and Twin Bonanza landing gear: the Merlin.

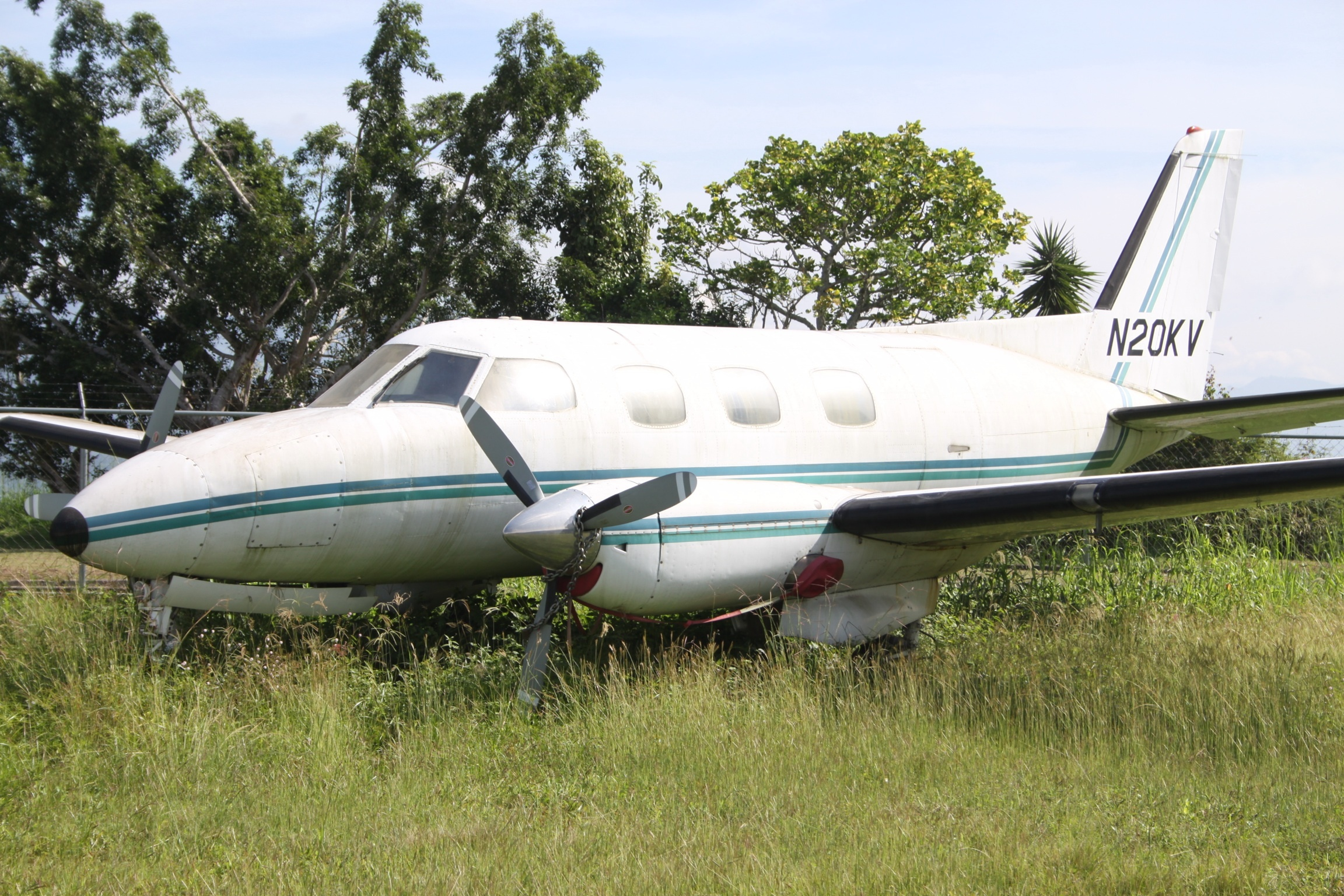
SA26T Merlin IIB

The prototype IIA took to the air for the first time on 13 April 1965, about fifteen months after the competing Beech Model 65-90 King Air (which was also derived from the Model 65 Queen Air). 36 Merlin IIA models were built before a follow-on model with Garrett AiResearch TPE-331-1 engines called the SA26-AT Merlin IIB entered production after AiResearch was appointed as distributor for the type. The TPE-331 became the definitive engine of all subsequent production Merlins and the longer-fuselage Metros that were to follow.

These visual similarities ended with the next model, the SA226-T Merlin III, which was placed in production in February 1972 after 87 Merlin IIBs were built. This had new wings and engine nacelles with inverted inlet Garrett engines (this again becoming a defining feature of all subsequent production models), new landing gear with two wheels on each leg, a redesigned horizontal tail mounted on the vertical fin instead of on the fuselage as in earlier models (This and subsequent Merlin and Metro models have a trimmable horizontal stabilizer (THS) usually used on jet aircraft, one of only two turboprop aircraft types to have this design feature). and a redesigned longer nose with room for a baggage compartment as well as the avionics found in the noses of Merlin II series aircraft. All of these design changes came from the Metro design, which was undergoing development in the late 1960s.

The SA226-TC Metro was more-or-less a new design, conceptually a stretch of the Merlin II (which it superficially resembled) sized to seat 22 passengers. Prototype construction of the Metro began in 1968 and first flight was on 26 August 1969. The standard engines offered were two TPE331-3UW turboprops driving three-bladed propellers. A corporate version called the SA226-AT Merlin IV was also marketed and initially sales of this version were roughly double that of the Metro. These sales were not immediately forthcoming however, as the company was financially stretched by the development of the Metro prototype and lacked the funds to gear up for production. This situation was rectified in late 1971 when Ed Swearingen agreed to sell 90% of the company to Fairchild; the company was then renamed Swearingen Aviation Corporation.

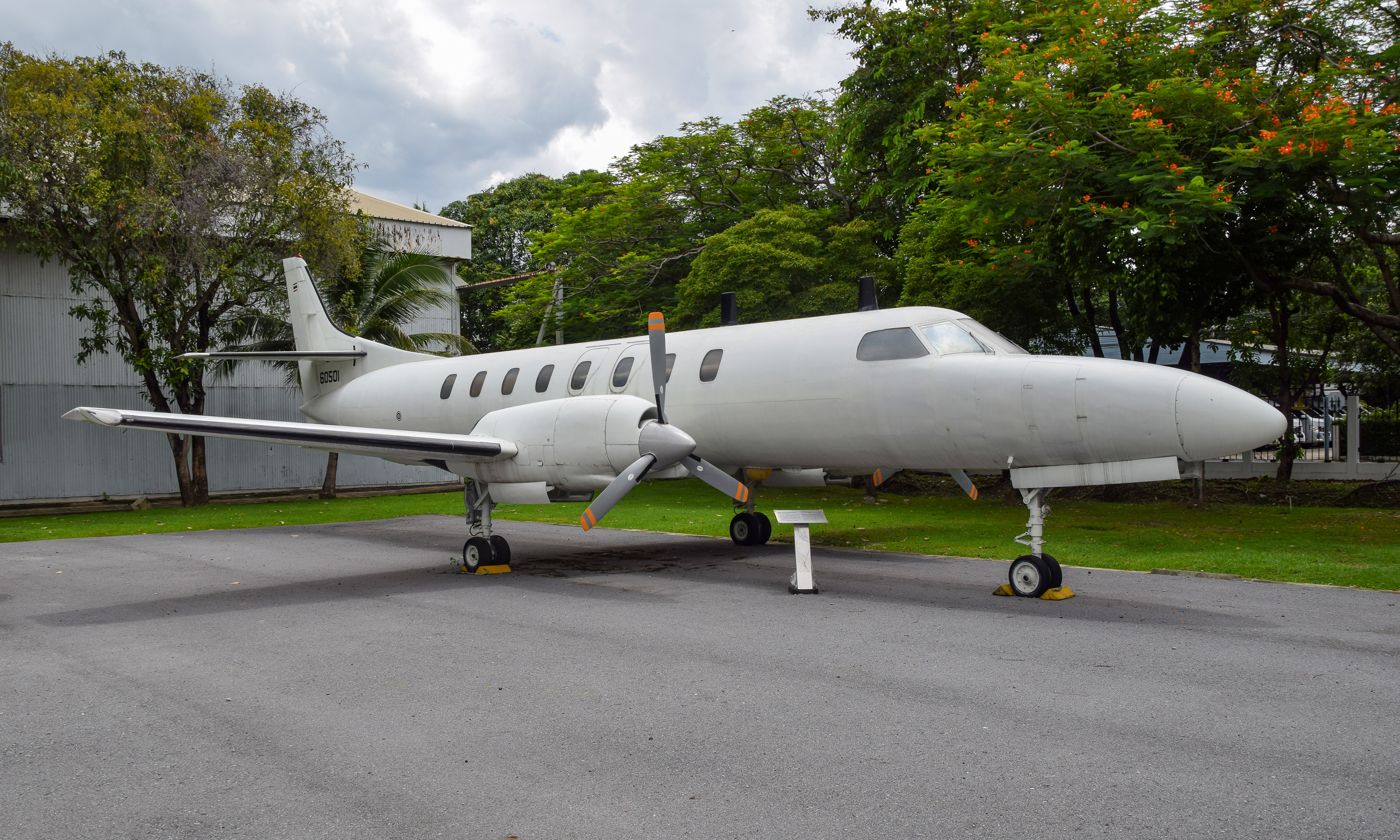
SA226-AT Merlin IVA of the Royal Thai Air Force

By the end of 1972 six Merlin IVs had been built and production gradually built up alongside the concurrently produced short-fuselage Merlin III. In 1974, the original Merlin IV and Metro models were replaced by the SA226-AT Merlin IVA and the SA226-TC Metro II after about 30 Merlin IVs and about 20 Metros had been built. Among the changes made were larger, ovalised rectangular windows replacing the circular porthole-style windows of the early aircraft, and optional provision for a small Rocket-Assisted Take Off (RATO) rocket in the tail cone, this being offered to improve takeoff performance out of "hot & high" airfields. The same year the Merlin III was replaced by the SA226-T Merlin IIIA, with an extra window on the right side of the cabin and a small window aft of the airstair on each side of the fuselage. Customers for the Merlin IIIA included the Argentinian Air Force, the Argentine Army and the Belgian Air Force.

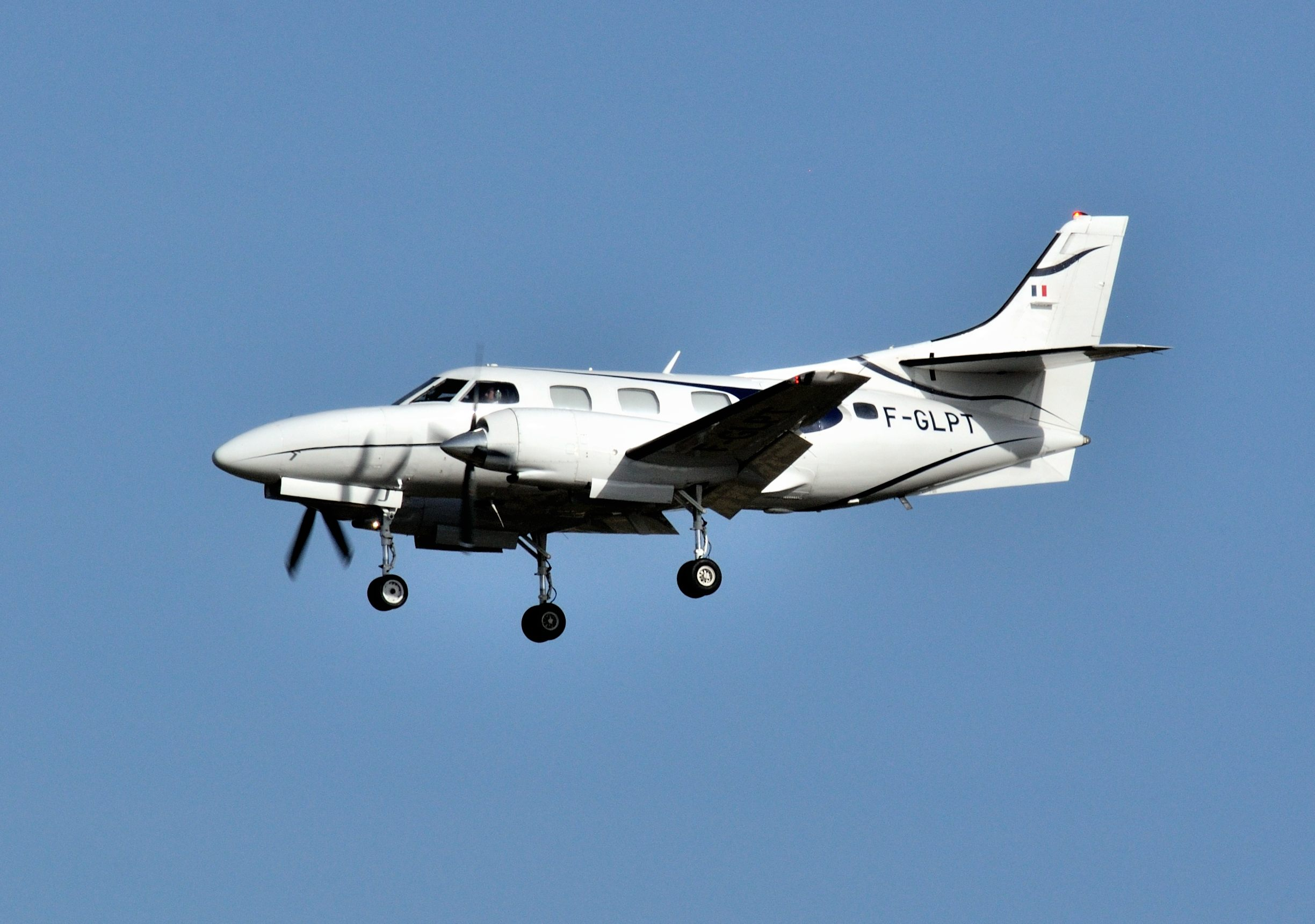
Merlin IIIA

In January 1979 production of the Merlin IIIA ended in favour of the SA226-T(B) Merlin IIIB. The IIIB differed mainly by TPE331-10U engines of increased power driving four-bladed propellers turning in the opposite direction to those of earlier models. The SA227-TT Merlin IIIC was next, introduced concurrently with the SA227-AC Metro III (the first Metro III was Fairchild c/n AC-420 and the first Merlin IIIC was c/n TT-421, Metro and Merlin aircraft at this stage being numbered consecutively with different prefixes to denote the different types), and the SA227-AT Merlin IVC version of the Metro III followed shortly after (the first Merlin IVC was c/n AT-423). The Merlin IIIC was a redesign to incorporate structural and other changes but was visually the same as the Merlin IIIB, the redesign taking place to make the aircraft compliant with Special Federal Aviation Regulation 41 (SFAR-41).

The Merlin IVC version was initially certified in 1980 at up to 14,000 pounds (6,400 kg) this increasing to 14,500 pounds (6,600 kg) as engines and structures were upgraded. An option to go as high as 16,000 pounds (7,300 kg) was offered. Other improvements incorporated into the Merlin IVC were a 10 ft (3.0 m) increase in wing span (achieved by the simple expedient of removing the wingtips from the Metro II wing, bolting an extension to the end of each wing, and fitting a new wingtip, redesigned to reduce drag), TPE331-11U engines with redesigned "quick-access" engine cowlings and driving four-bladed propellers as on the Merlin IIIB, and other drag-reducing airframe modifications including landing gear doors that close after the gear is extended. The US Army bought a second-hand Merlin IVC and operated it as the solitary UC-26C.

Towards the end of production of the short-fuselage variants of the Merlin, optional winglets were offered. Ten of the last 25 SA227-TTs were built with the winglets as Merlin 300s. Production of short-fuselage Merlins ended in 1983 with the building of Merlin IIIC c/n TT-541. The last Merlin IVC (c/n AT-695B) was built in 1987 and Metro production ended in 1998.

== Design ==
The SA26 Merlin is a pressurized Excalibur fitted with a different Lycoming TIGO-540 6-cylinder geared piston engine. The TIGO 540 was used despite the fact that one of the reasons the IO-720 was used in the Excalibur was that the Queen Air series' IGSO-480 and IGSO-540 engines from the same manufacturer were so troublesome. The decision was soon made to offer increased engine power, which was achieved through installing two Pratt & Whitney Canada PT6A-20 turboprop engines, resulting in the SA26-T Merlin IIA.

The Merlin IIAs and IIBs were visually still obviously derivatives of the Queen Air, featuring as they did Queen Air tailplanes and wings with the same flat-top engine nacelles as the Excalibur Queen Airs; the airstair in the same place and of the same general design as the Queen Air; and the nose being especially similar, of the same general shape with access panels the same size, shape and location as those of the Queen Air.

== Operational history ==
The Australian Department of Civil Aviation (now the Civil Aviation Safety Authority) took delivery of four Merlin IIBs in 1969 and operated them for almost fifteen years.

== Variants ==
=== Civil variants ===
SA26 Merlin
Prototype piston-engined Merlin
SA26-T Merlin II
Prototype re-engined with two PT6A Turboprops.
SA26-T Merlin IIA
Production version of Merlin II with two Pratt & Whitney Canada PT6A-20 Turboprop engines.
SA26-T Merlin IIB
Similar to Merlin IIA but with two Garrett AiResearch TPE331-1-151G Turboprop engines.
SA226-T Merlin III
Redesign of Merlin II with new fuselage and incorporating Metro wing, landing gear and tail; two TPE331-3U-303G Turboprops.
SA226-T Merlin IIIA
Update of Merlin III design, changes include extra windows.
SA226-T(B) Merlin IIIB
Update of Merlin IIIA design, changes include TPE331-10U-503G engines driving 4-bladed propellers; systems changes and revised interior and air conditioning.
SA227-TT Merlin IIIC
Redesign to meet SFAR-41 standard.
SA227-TP Merlin IIID
Proposed IIIC variant with PT6A engines.
SA227-TT Merlin 300
Merlin IIIC fitted with winglets
SA226-AT Merlin IV
21-seat corporate version of the Metro, with two TPE331-3U-303G engines.
SA226-AT Merlin IVA
Merlin IV with minor changes, most noticeably with ovalised rectangular cabin windows instead of round windows; corporate version of Metro II.
SA227-AT Merlin IVC
Corporate version of Metro III with increased Maximum Take-Off Weight compared to Metro III. SA227-AT also built as Expediter freighter version without cabin windows (see Fairchild Swearingen Metroliner).

=== Military variants ===
C-26
Designation of the United States armed forces for the Metroliner series. It was not officially named by the US Armed Forces.
UC-26C
Single second-hand 1983-built Merlin IVC operated by the US Army for several years with the serial 89–1471.
B.L.6
(Thai: บ.ล.๖) Royal Thai Armed Forces designation for the Merlin III and Merlin IVA.
B.TL.6
(Thai: บ.ตล.๖) Royal Thai Armed Forces designation for the Merlin IVC.

== Military operators ==
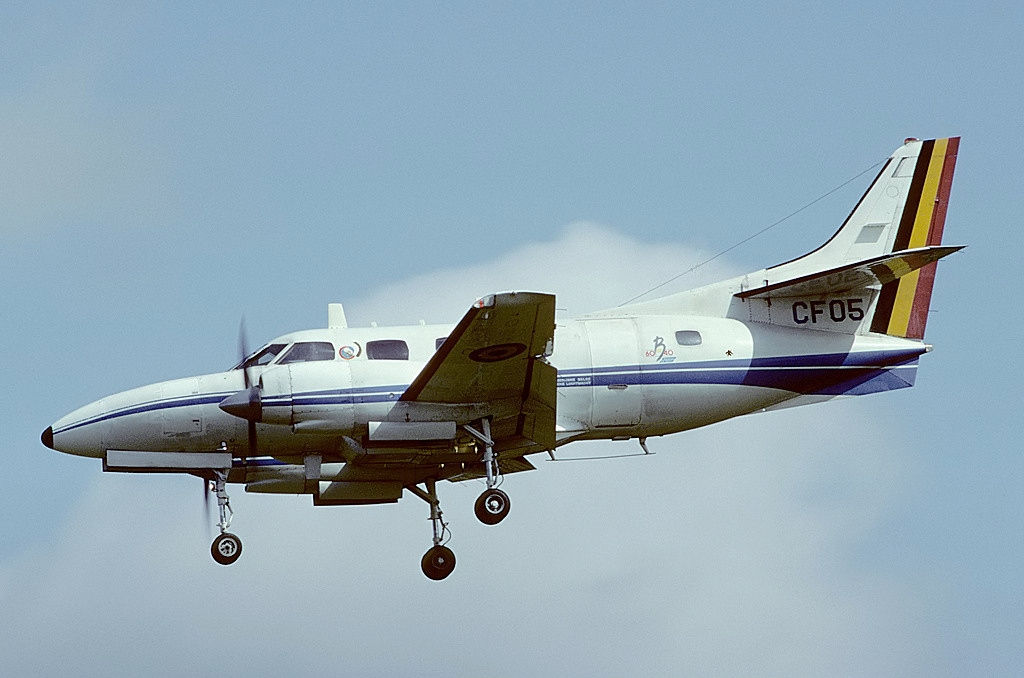
Belgium Air Force

Argentina

- Argentine Air Force – Two Merlin IVAs were used in the search and rescue role.
- Argentine Army – Five Merlin IVAs.

Belgium

- Belgium Air Force – Six Merlin IIAs

South Africa

- South African Air Force – Seven Merlin IVAs
  - No. 21 Squadron SAAF

Sweden

- Swedish Air Force

Thailand

- Royal Thai Air Force – Four Merlin IVA, three equipped as survey aircraft.

United States

- United States Army

== Incidents and accidents ==
As of May 2021 there have been 63 documented incidents and 96 deaths involving the Merlin. Listed below are a select few of the most notable ones.

- 1 April 1993: NASCAR champion Alan Kulwicki died in the crash of a Merlin III, aircraft registration N500AK, near Blountville, Tennessee, while on approach to the nearby Tri-Cities Regional Airport. All four people on board, including two executives of the Hooters restaurant chain, were killed. The National Transportation Safety Board (NTSB) attributed the accident to "Failure of the pilot to follow procedures concerning the use of the engine inlet anti-ice system and/or continuous ignition while operating in icing conditions."
- 23 April 2021: a Merlin IIIB, registration N59EZ, crashed near Winslow, Arizona, killing IndyCar racer and 1979 24 Hours of Le Mans winner Bill Whittington and the other occupant. The NTSB determined the primary cause of this incident was a loss of power to the right engine, but added Whittington's failure to maintain control of the aircraft was a contributing factor.

== Specifications (Merlin IIIC, SFAR 41 certification) ==
Data from Jane's All The World's Aircraft 1982–83.

General characteristics

- Crew: 2
- Capacity: up to 9 passengers
- Length: 42 ft 2 in (12.85 m)
- Wingspan: 46 ft 3 in (14.10 m)
- Height: 16 ft 10 in (5.13 m)
- Wing area: 277.5 sq ft (25.78 m^{2})
- Aspect ratio: 7.71:1
- Airfoil: NACA 65_{2}A215 at root, 64_{2}A415 at tip
- Empty weight: 8,150 lb (3,697 kg)
- Max takeoff weight: 13,230 lb (6,001 kg)
- Fuel capacity: 648 US gal (540 imp gal; 2,450 L)
- Powerplant: 2 × Garrett AiResearch TPE-331-10U-503G turboprops, 900 shp (670 kW) each
- Propellers: 4-bladed Dowty Type R.321, 8 ft 10 in (2.69 m) diameter

Performance

- Cruise speed: 300 kn (350 mph, 560 km/h) at 10,000 ft (3,050 m) (max cruise)
- Stall speed: 92 kn (106 mph, 170 km/h) (flaps and landing gear down)
- Range: 1,938 nmi (2,230 mi, 3,589 km) at 26,000 ft (7,900 m), six occupants
- Ferry range: 2,239 nmi (2,577 mi, 4,147 km)
- Service ceiling: 27,000 ft (8,200 m)
- Rate of climb: 2,650 ft/min (13.5 m/s)
- Take off run to 50 ft (15 m): 2,920 ft (890 m)
- Landing run from 50 ft (15 m): 2,920 ft (890 m)

== See also ==
Related development

- Beechcraft Queen Air
- Beechcraft Twin Bonanza
- Fairchild C-26 Metroliner
- Fairchild Swearingen Metroliner

Aircraft of comparable role, configuration, and era

- Beechcraft King Air
- Cessna 425 Conquest I/Corsair and 441 Conquest II
- Embraer EMB 121 Xingu
- Mitsubishi MU-2
- Piaggio Avanti
- Piper PA-31T and PA-42 Cheyenne
- Rockwell/Gulfstream Turbo Commander

Related lists

- List of military aircraft of the United States
