= SyberJet SJ30 =

Light business jet

SJ30-2
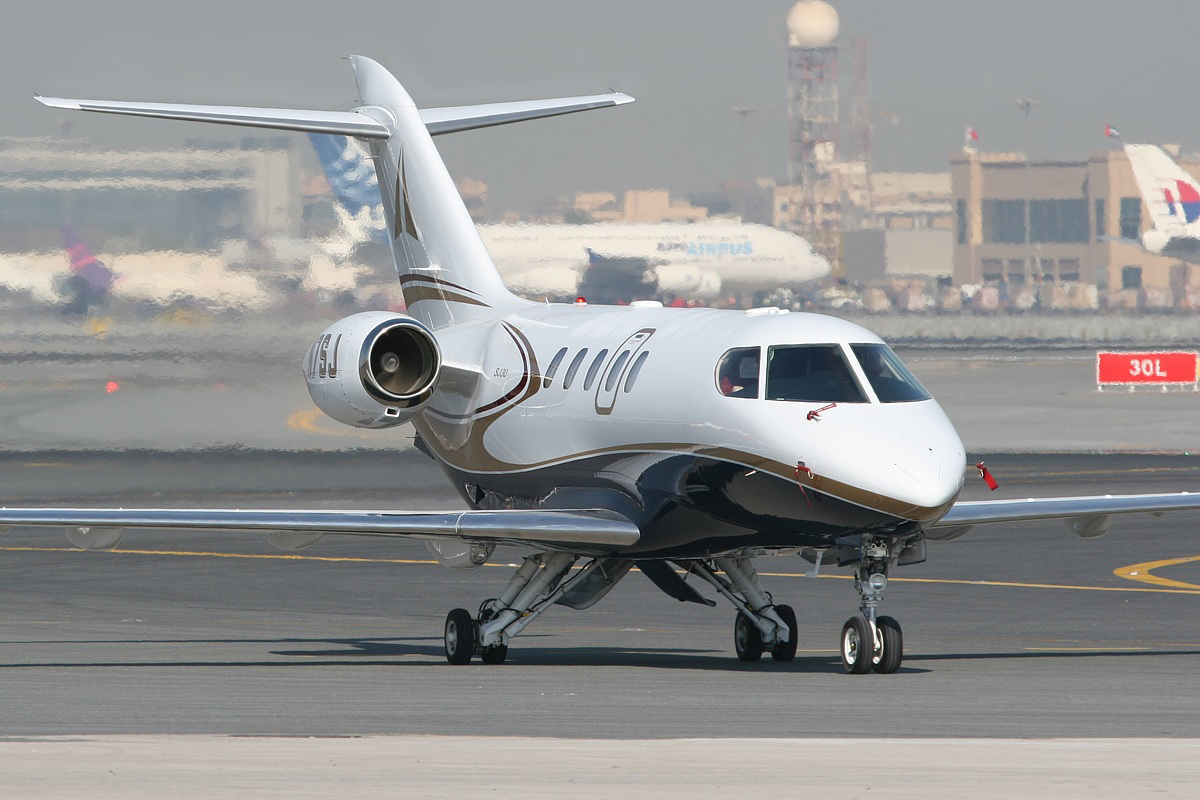
- A Sino Swearingen SJ30-2 seen at the 2007 Dubai Airshow

General information
- Type: Light business jet
- National origin: United States of America
- Manufacturer: SyberJet Aircraft
- Designer: Edward J. Swearingen
- Number built: 8

History
- Introduction date: November 1, 2006
- First flight: 13 February 1991 (SJ30-1); November 1996 (SJ30-2)

The SyberJet SJ30 is a light business jet built by American company SyberJet Aircraft. In October 1986, Ed Swearingen announced the new design, a 6 to 8 person aircraft powered by two Williams FJ44 turbofans. Initially backed by Gulfstream Aerospace from October 1988, the Jaffe Group took over in September 1989 and the first SJ-30 flew on February 13, 1991 but development halted afterwards. The Taiwan-based Sino Swearingen Aircraft Corporation rescued the program, the jet was stretched by 4.3 ft (1.3 m) into the SJ30-2 with a wingspan increased by six feet (1.8 m).

It made its first flight on November 8, 1996 and was certified by the FAA on October 27, 2005, before a first delivery by November 1, 2006. Dubai investors acquired Sino Swearingen in 2008, changing its name to Emivest, but production ceased in November 2009 and the company filed for bankruptcy on October 26, 2010. On April 7, 2011, assets were sold to its aft fuselage supplier Metalcraft Technologies, renaming the company SyberJet Aircraft and planning to restart production in 2019. With updated avionics and interior, the SJ30i made its maiden flight on October 9, 2019.

== Development ==
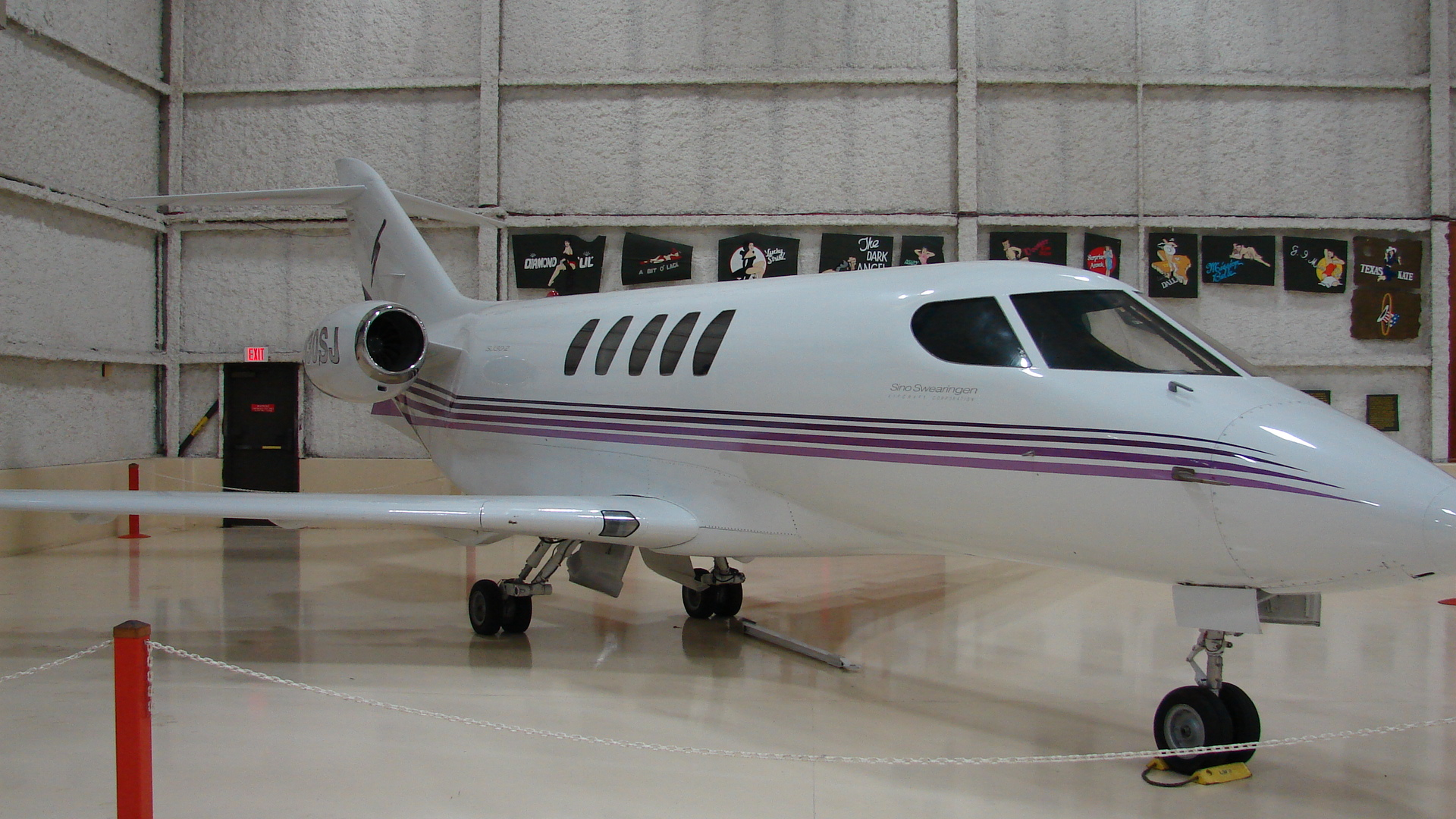
An SJ30 prototype

Ed Swearingen announced a new design for a light twin business jet in October 1986, the SA-30 Fanjet. The SA-30 was to be a 6 to 8 person aircraft powered by two Williams FJ44 turbofans and with a highly swept wing of relatively small area. It was planned to be more efficient than contemporary business jets, and to sell for $2 million. In October 1988 an agreement was signed with Gulfstream Aerospace with the SA-30 to be manufactured and sold by Gulfstream as the Gulfstream Gulfjet. Gulfstream withdrew from the project in September 1989, causing Swearingen to get backing from the Jaffe Group of San Antonio, with the aircraft to be built in a factory next to Dover Air Force Base, Delaware. This resulted in the aircraft again being redesignated as the SJ-30 (later "SJ30-1").

The first SJ-30 flew on 13 February 1991, and was demonstrated at the 1991 Paris Air Show, but development ground to a halt when financial support from the state of Delaware was withdrawn. The program was rescued by Lockheed, who arranged a joint venture between Swearingen and Taiwanese investors as part of the offset agreement for Taiwan's purchase of the F-16 fighters. The Sino Swearingen Aircraft Corporation was set up, with the aircraft now to be built at Martinsburg, West Virginia.

=== 1995-2008: Sino Swearingen ===
It was subsequently decided to modify the original design as the SJ30-2, with a 4 ft 4 in (1.32 m) longer fuselage, a wingspan increased by 6 feet (1.8 m) and a 1.5-degree wing anhedral changed to an equivalent dihedral. This promised a significant increase in range. The prototype was modified and flew in the new configuration on 8 November 1996, and with the intended FJ44-2a engines on 4 September 1997. Amidst construction delays caused by funding issues, two "as-designed" pre-production aircraft (serial numbers 002, performing the aerodynamics/stability & control testing; and 003, performing systems testing) were built and the design entered certification testing.

In 1996 Sino Swearingen petitioned to certify as a Commuter Category aircraft arguing that it was as safe, or safer than the current Part 23 Commuter Category aircraft. At the time only the Fairchild Metro 23 and the Beechcraft 1900D had been certified under these rules. Approval of this request allowed the SJ30 program to exceed the 12,500 lbs takeoff weight limit of Part 23 and paved the way for other companies to follow the SJ30 lead.

Further modifications included increasing the height of the landing gear by seven inches and widening it by nearly a foot. The new design was certified by the FAA in early 2003.

In April 2003, S/N 002 crashed during flight testing, causing further delays in the certification program. The crash was attributed to "incomplete high-Mach design research, which resulted in the airplane becoming unstable and diverging into a lateral upset."

After a series of additional design changes, S/N 004, originally slated as the functionality & maintainability (F & M) test article, took over the testing role of S/N 002 (with S/N 005 taking on the F & M role).

The SJ30-2 was certified by the FAA on October 27, 2005. The first production SJ30, S/N 006, was delivered to its first customer by November 1, 2006.

=== 2008-2011: Emivest ===
Sino Swearingen was acquired by investors from Dubai in 2008. The Dubai-based company became the majority shareholder in Sino Swearingen, with the Taiwanese government and private investors taking minority stakes. The company name was changed to the Emivest Aerospace Corporation.

The order book for the $7.5 million aircraft was reported to be largely unaffected by the funding setbacks, with the tally reportedly exceeding 300 units including 159 from Action Aviation.

Production ceased in November 2009. On October 26, 2010, Emivest filed for bankruptcy after being unable to find further funds to continue operations.

=== Since 2011: Metalcraft ===
On April 7, 2011, a judge approved sale of Emivest assets to MT LLC of Utah, an ownership group affiliated with Metalcraft Technologies, Inc. of Cedar City, Utah, a parts supplier for the SJ30. According to a news article, Emivest vice president Mark Fairchild stated that according to his understanding, MT planned to maintain Emivest as a jet manufacturer, though he didn't know any details.

As of June 15, 2011, Metalcraft Technologies, the Cedar City, Utah-based company that purchased Emivest out of bankruptcy, MT LC, announced that the new company name would be SyberJet Aircraft. Metalcraft also owns the SJ30 type certificate. Metalcraft-owned SyberJet plans to restart production in 2019.

Metalcraft Technologies was the aft fuselage supplier for the aircraft and its parent MTI made the acquisition in 2011. The five incomplete jets acquired from Emivest will be offered as SJ30is, an upgraded SJ30-2 certificated in 2005 with four in service. SJ30i is FJ44-3AP-2A-powered, has new avionics based on Honeywell’s Primus Epic 2.0, and redesigned interior. It is priced at $8.5 million.

The SJ30i made its maiden flight on 9 October 2019 from San Antonio, Texas, starting an 18-month certification test program with deliveries planned for early 2021. In January 2020, it completed a series of avionics tests (so-called aircraft control identification (ACID) tests), logging 55 hours in total.

The $9 million SJ30x will be the new production from Serial number 15, with leaner and higher thrust FJ44-3AP-25s; certification and service entry are scheduled for 2023.

== Design ==
The SJ30 can seat up to six passengers plus one pilot. A unique feature of this aircraft is that it maintains a 'sea level cabin' (zero cabin altitude) up to 41,000 ft (12,000 m) (due to its 12 psi (83 kPa) differential pressure) thereby reducing fatigue due to lower cabin altitude.

The SJ30 was the first aircraft designed around a 12 psi (83 kPa) cabin for more comfort in the cabin. This results in a sea level cabin through 41,000 ft (12,000 m) and less than a 1,800 ft (550 m) cabin altitude at its ceiling of 49,000 ft (15,000 m). The 12 psi (83 kPa) cabin differential was first demonstrated in flight by company pilots on August 23, 2004.

== Operational history ==
By 2023, only a single SJ-30 was flying.

=== Records ===
The SJ30 holds the following world's records through the FAI/NAA:

- Recognized Speed Over a Closed Course - San Antonio, TX to Goose Bay, Canada
- Recognized Speed Over a Closed Course - San Antonio, TX to London, England
- Recognized Speed Over a Closed Course - London, England to Dubai. UAE

In 2006, Fédération Aéronautique Internationale (FAI), the international umbrella organization of the National Aeronautic Association (NAA) awarded Sino Swearingen Aircraft Corporation's SJ30 the FAI Honorary Group Diploma.

== Variants ==
SJ30-1 (flown, but never certified)
Prototype (S/N 001) later modified to SJ30-2 standard.
SJ30-2 (certified in 2005)
Stretched production variant.
Sino Swearingen Aircraft manufactured: Flight test articles (S/N's 002, 003, and 004); Production aircraft (S/N's 005, 006, and 007).
Emivest Aerospace manufactured: S/N's 008 and 010.
SJ30i, by SyberJet Aircraft; scheduled to be certified by 2021
SJ30-2 with new SyberVision avionics and new Jason Castriota Interior (S/N's 005, 009, 011, 012, 013, and 014); Retrofits (S/N 005).
SJ30x; planned for 2023
SJ30i powered by Williams International FJ44-3AP-25 engines. Begins at S/N 015.

== Specifications (SJ30i) ==
Data from Business & Commercial Aviation

General characteristics

- Crew: 1 or 2 pilots (the SJ30 is certified as single pilot)
- Capacity: 7 occupants (including crew)
- Length: 46.8 ft (14.3 m)
- Wingspan: 42.3 ft (12.9 m)
- Height: 14.2 ft (4.3 m)
- Empty weight: 8,917 lb (4,045 kg)
- Max takeoff weight: 13,950 lb (6,328 kg)
- Pressurization: 12 psi (83 kPa)
- Cabin height: 4.4 ft (1.34 m)
- Cabin width: 4.8 ft (1.46 m)
- Powerplant: 2 × Williams International FJ44-2A turbofan, 2,300 lbf (10 kN) thrust each

Performance

- Maximum speed: 486 kn (559 mph, 900 km/h)
- Stall speed: 93 kn (107 mph, 172 km/h)
- Range: 2,500 nmi (2,900 mi, 4,600 km)
- Service ceiling: 49,000 ft (15,000 m)
- Rate of climb: 3,663 ft/min (18.61 m/s)
- Fuel burn at high-speed cruise: 1,188 lb/h (539 kg/h) at 475 kn TAS at FL360
- Fuel burn at long-range cruise: 684 lb/h (310 kg/h) at 436 kn TAS at FL450

Avionics

- Honeywell Primus Epic 2.0

== See also ==
- Embraer Phenom 300
- Cessna CitationJet/M2
- Pilatus PC-24
