= Ed Swearingen =

American aerospace engineer (1925–2014)

Edward "Ed" James Swearingen (12 September 1925 – 15 May 2014) was an aeronautical engineer based in San Antonio, Texas. He is the founder of Swearingen Aircraft, where he focused on developing innovative business jets and turboprops. His most notable work included the development of the Metro series commuter aircraft and early designs that evolved into the SJ30 light jet. The company he founded eventually evolved into what is known today as SyberJet Aircraft.

== Life ==
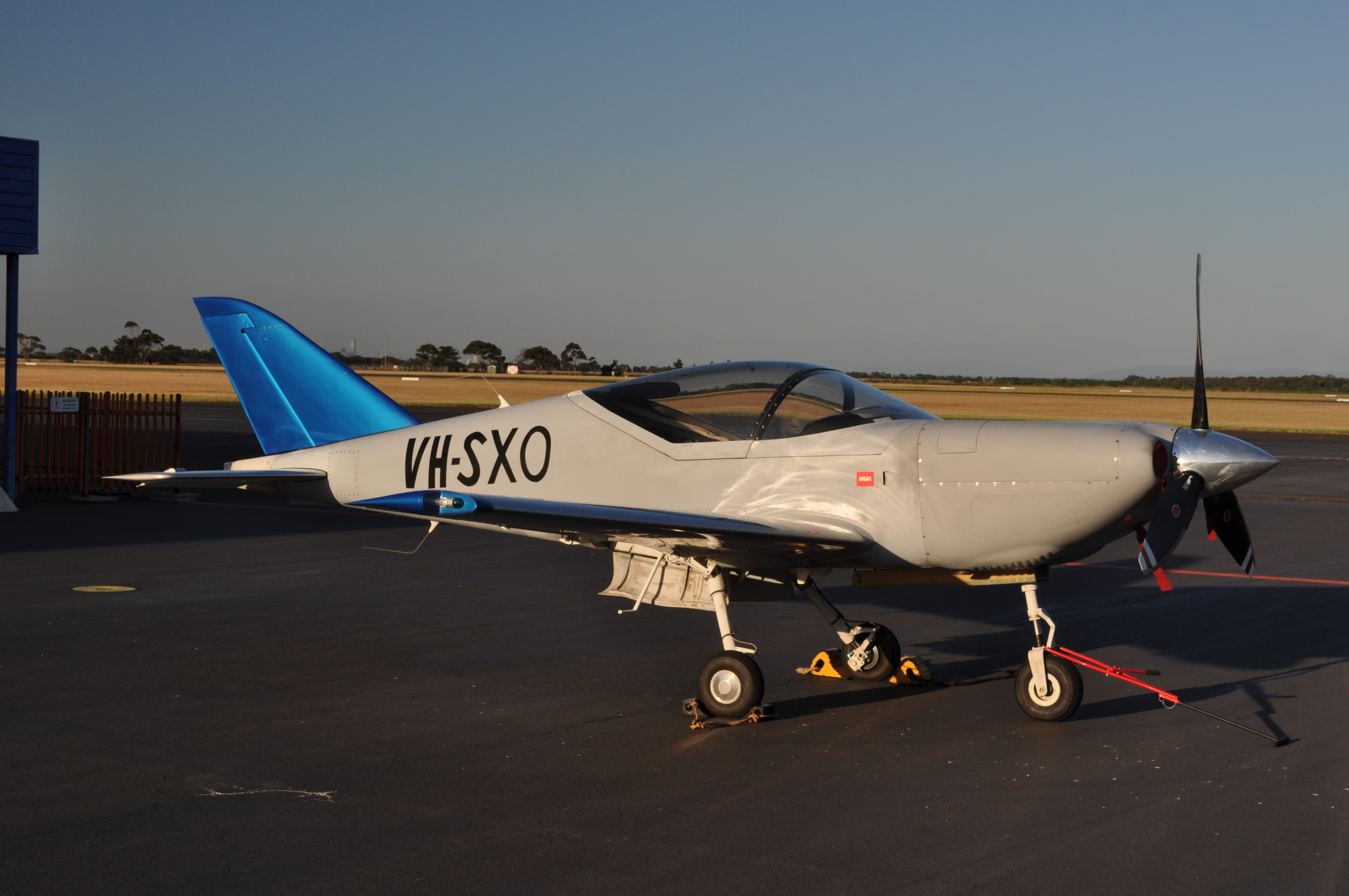
Swearingen SX-300

Swearingen was notable for developing modifications from existing production aircraft, such as the Piper PA-30 Twin Comanche from the Piper PA-24 Comanche single engine series and the Swearingen Merlin turboprop aircraft from the Beech Model 50 Twin Bonanza. Swearingen also developed original aircraft designs, such as the SX-300 experimental airplane and Sino Swearingen SJ30-2 executive jet.
