= SyberJet Aircraft =

American aircraft manufacturer based in Cedar City, Utah

- Type: Private
- Industry: Aviation; Manufacturing
- Founded: 1959; 67 years ago
- Founder: Ed Swearingen
- Headquarters: Chandler, Arizona, United States
- Key people: Trevor Milton, CEO
- Products: Business jets
- Number of employees: 100 (2025)
- Website: www.syberjet.com

SyberJet Aircraft (SJA) is an American aircraft manufacturer. The company's headquarters is in Chandler, Arizona, near the Chandler Municipal Airport with additional engineering offices and manufacturing, service, repair and fatigue test facilities near and on the San Antonio International Airport in San Antonio, Texas, and offices located in Cedar City, Utah.

Originally founded as Swearingen Aircraft in 1959, the company underwent several ownership and name changes over the decades. It became Sino Swearingen Aircraft Company in 1995, and was later acquired in August 2008 by the Emirates Investment and Development Corporation, after which it was renamed Emivest Aerospace Corporation. In April 2011, the assets of Emivest Aerospace were purchased by MT, LLC of Cedar City, Utah, and the company began doing business as SyberJet Aircraft. In 2025, Trevor Milton took over leadership of SyberJet Aircraft and became its CEO.

== History ==
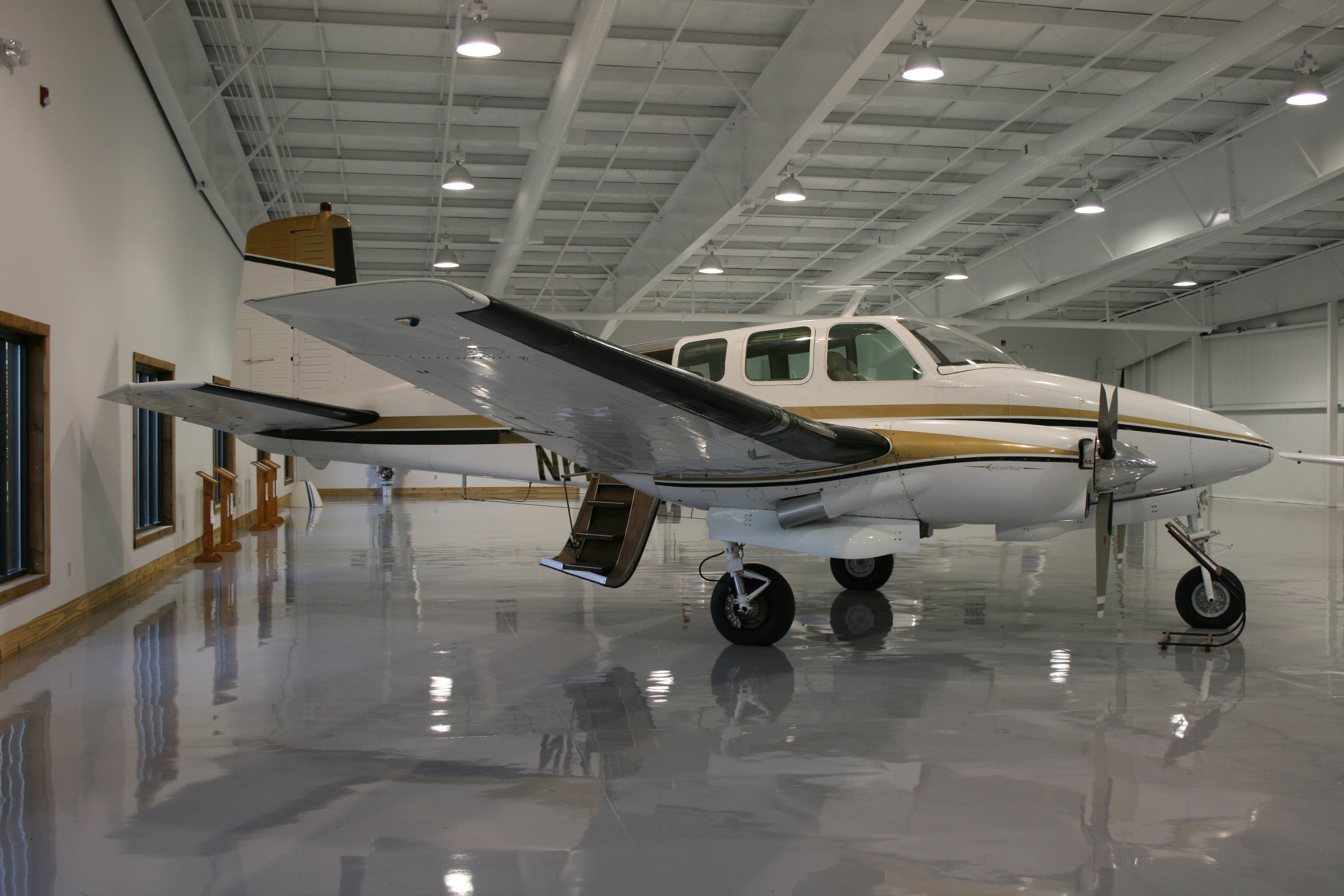
An Excalibur 800 on display at the Beechcraft Heritage Museum

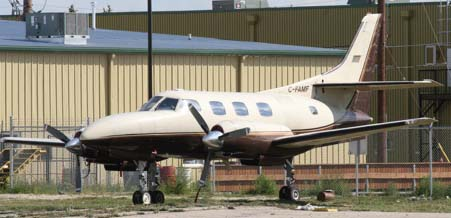
A Canadian-registered SA226-T Merlin III

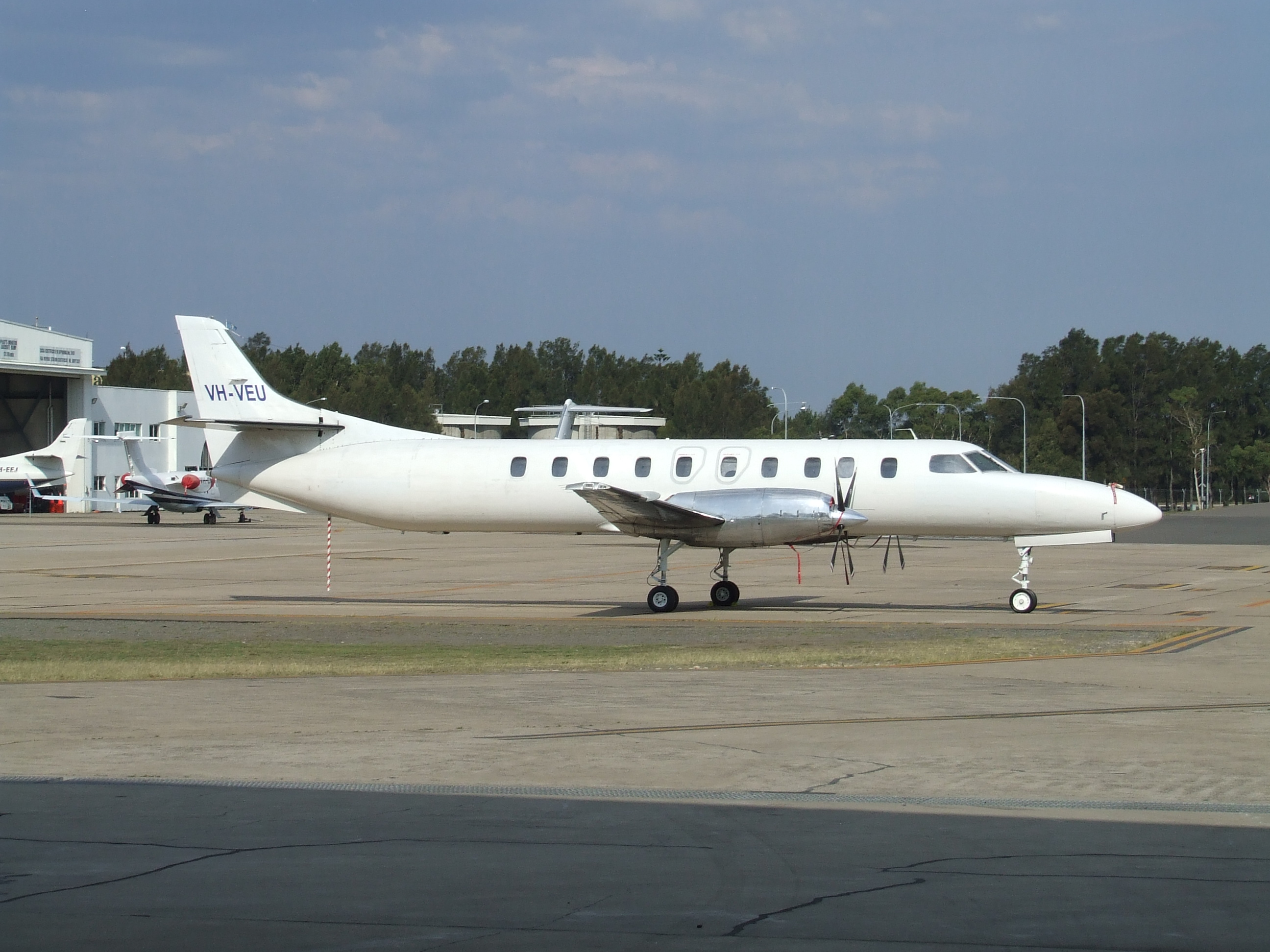
A Metro 23 at Sydney International Airport

=== Swearingen Aircraft ===
Swearingen Aircraft was founded by Ed Swearingen in 1959. Early work by the company included the development of prototype aircraft for other manufacturers; such as the Twin Comanche prototype developed for Piper Aircraft during 1962 and the development of several research helicopters for the Bell Helicopter Company, work which led to the HueyCobra. The company also developed modifications of other designs, an activity Ed Swearingen had been involved in prior to his forming Swearingen Aircraft. These modification programs included the Excalibur 800 conversion of the Beechcraft Twin Bonanza, (because the combined output of its two Lycoming IO-720 engines was 800 horsepower); airframe improvements included modifying the cabin to allow entry via an airstair instead of over the RH wing to a door, and landing gear doors that fully enclosed the wheels when retracted. The airstair was factory-fitted by Beechcraft during manufacture of the ultimate J50 model of the Twin Bonanza. The Queen Air development of the Twin Bonanza also received the Swearingen treatment, the Queen Air Excalibur having less extensive modifications, also involving fitting of 400 hp (300 kW) IO-720s, replacing the more troublesome and lower-power geared Lycoming engines installed at manufacture, and the enclosed landing gear doors (the Queen Air was designed from the outset with an airstair). The United States Army had several of its U-8 versions of the Queen Air modified to this standard. Excalibur aircraft are easily distinguishable from standard Twin Bonanzas and Queen Airs by the landing gear doors and the more rectangular engine cowlings of the Excaliburs compared to the rounded cowlings of the originals.

The Excaliburs led to the first Swearingen design, the SA26 Merlin, which could be described as a pressurized Excalibur. The Merlin had modified Queen Air wings with redesigned fuel tanks, Queen Air horizontal tails, and Twin Bonanza landing gear. The Merlin's fuselage and vertical fin represented Swearingen's contribution to the overall design. The next step was turbine power, through the SA26-T Merlin IIA with Pratt & Whitney Canada PT6s and the follow-on SA26-AT Merlin IIB with Garrett TPE331 turboprops. Next came the all-new SA226-T Merlin III with new wings, landing gear and cruciform horizontal tail mated to a slightly stretched version of the fuselage used on the Merlin II series. The design effort reached its logical conclusion with the Metro series of 19-seat airline aircraft, the first of which had its first flight on August 26, 1969. By this time the company was in financial difficulties and lacked the resources to proceed further, so the Metro did not enter production until Swearingen Aircraft was taken over by Fairchild in 1972. The company was then renamed the Swearingen Aviation Corporation with Ed Swearingen a 10% shareholder and chairman of the board of directors. A total of 1,053 Merlins and Metros had been produced when production ended in 1998; 350 short-fuselage Merlins and 703 long-fuselage Merlins and Metros.

In 1971 Piper Aircraft entered into merger negotiations with Swearingen, but did not finalize the merger. In 1973 Ed Swearingen formed a new company and went back to modifying aircraft, developing a new version of the Lockheed Jetstar on behalf of the manufacturer and Garrett. The modifications entailed installing new Garrett TFE731 engines and aerodynamic improvements to the airframe, increasing the Jetstar's range from 1,800 nautical miles (3,330 km) to 2,600 nautical miles (4,820 km) with no increase in fuel capacity. The company then manufactured jet engine nacelles and other aircraft components as a subcontractor to various manufacturers including Cessna, Gates Learjet and Dassault. On May 1, 1982 Ed Swearingen resigned from Fairchild and exercised his right to reacquire the Swearingen business name. Fairchild changed the name of Swearingen Aviation to Fairchild Aircraft Corporation and Ed Swearingen's company then became the Swearingen Aircraft Corporation.

=== Sino Swearingen ===
The company devoted its energies to developing a new small jet for the general aviation market, which was eventually developed into the SJ30-2. The company was renamed Sino Swearingen Aircraft Corporation (SSAC) in 1995 and it was converted into a limited company from a partnership on November 5, 1999. Financial backers of the company included the Ministry of Economic Affairs of Taiwan. The company was privately held, and sales for 2005 were reported at US$25.3 million.

SSAC had spent over 12 years and over US$700 million in total investment by 2008, when investors from Dubai were introduced to Sino Swearingen by Action Aviation, Sino Swearingen’s largest distributor. The Dubai-based company became the majority shareholder in Sino Swearingen, with the Taiwanese government and private investors such as Action Aviation taking minority stakes.

The acquisition by the Dubai investors followed the withdrawal from the sale in 2007 of SSAC's former investor, ACQ Capital, which was unable to proceed due to its exposure to the US sub-prime market. A 17 September 2008 press release stated that the Dubai investors would provide additional funding of up to $1 billion to help it design and develop its second aircraft model.

The SJ30 program was the first aircraft program to successfully petition for and gain approval to certify as a Part 23 Commuter Category jet. In 1996 Sino Swearingen petitioned to certify as a Commuter Category aircraft arguing that it was as safe, or safer than the current Part 23 Commuter Category aircraft. At the time only the Fairchild Metro 23 and the Beechcraft 1900D had been certified under these rules. Approval of this request allowed the SJ30 program to exceed the 12,500 lbs takeoff weight limit of Part 23 and paved the way for other companies to follow the SJ30 lead.

The SJ30 program was the first jet aircraft company in over 30 years (since Learjet in 1963) to develop, certify, and manufacture a brand new jet aircraft. With all of it trials and tribulations, the SJ30 program showed why it is so difficult to build a company and develop and certify an aircraft at the same time, thus demonstrating why no one else had done it since Learjet.

The SJ30 program was the first to fly both the Williams FJ44-1 and FJ44-2A engine and was instrumental in developing the engines with Williams International. Subsequent incorporation of the engines at Cessna and Raytheon led to their CitationJet and Premier aircraft, respectively.

In keeping with Ed Swearingen’s vision of a better light jet, the SJ30 was the first aircraft designed around a 12 psi cabin for more comfort in the cabin. The 12 psi cabin results in a sea level cabin through 41,000 ft and less than a 1,800 ft cabin at its ceiling of 49,000 ft. The 12 psi cabin was first demonstrated in flight by company pilots on August 23, 2004.

The original SJ30-1 prototype was on display at the Lone Star Flight Museum in Galveston, Texas when it was flooded by Hurricane Ike.

As proof of its speed and range capability the SJ30 holds the following world’s records through the FAI/NAA: Recognized Speed Over a Closed Course – San Antonio, Texas to Goose Bay, Canada, Recognized Speed Over a Closed Course - San Antonio, Texas to London, England, Recognized Speed Over a Closed Course - London, England to Dubai, United Arab Emirates.

In 2006, the National Aeronautic Association awarded Sino Swearingen Aircraft Corporation's SJ30 the FAI Honorary Group Diploma.

=== Emivest ===
Sino Swearingen was acquired by investors from Dubai in 2008. The Dubai-based company became the majority shareholder in Sino Swearingen, with the Taiwanese government and private investors taking minority stakes. The company name was changed to the Emivest Aerospace Corporation.

On October 26, 2010, Emivest filed for bankruptcy after being unable to find further funds to continue operations.

On April 7, 2011, a judge approved sale of Emivest assets to MT, LLC of Utah, an ownership group affiliated with Metalcraft Technologies, Inc. of Cedar City, Utah, a parts supplier for the SJ30. According to a news article, Emivest vice president Mark Fairchild stated that according to his understanding, MT, LLC planned to maintain Emivest as a jet manufacturer, though he didn't know any details.

=== SyberJet ===
On June 15, 2011, MT, LLC, the Cedar City, Utah-based company that purchased the assets of Emivest out of bankruptcy announced that the new company name would be SyberJet Aircraft. SyberJet owns the SJ30 type certificate.

During and in support of the NBAA show SyberJet signed a contract with Honeywell for the development and purchase of its APEX (now Epic 2.0) avionics platform to be branded as SyberVision^{R} for the SJ30. In addition, SyberJet's factory Part 145 service center is appointed as a Williams International service station.

Honeywell was chosen for several reasons, but the ability to get to market the quickest as well as their more attractive financial model pushed the decision in their favor.

In June 2013 SyberJet announced a family of companies under the MSC Aerospace brand. MSC Aerospace is a family of integrated and synergistic companies with aerospace related operations. SyberJet Aircraft is the manufacturer of the world’s fastest light jet, the SJ30. SyberJet assemblies major assemblies, installs components, and systems, complete final assembly and production ground and flight tests in Cedar City, Utah as well as offices that include executive, finance, procurement, completions, and sales/marketing offices. The Texas location provides engineering, flight test operations, and flight training, as well as the location for the central repair station for support of the SJ30 customer fleet. Cedar City also has a satellite repair station location to support the West Coast customer fleet. Metalcraft Technologies, Inc (MTI) is another one of the MSC Aerospace companies which supports the fabrication and assembly of detail aircraft parts and aero-structures for leading aircraft manufacturers. In fact, MTI produced approximately 70% of the sheet metal parts and assembled the aft fuselage on the SJ30 since 1997. Other customers include Lockheed-Martin, Boeing, Gulfstream, Middle River, Piper Aircraft, and Cessna Aircraft.CBI Associates is the third member of the MSC Aerospace family and is real estate development and management arm of MSC.

SyberJet announced a final assembly location during press ceremonies in Cedar City, Utah. The Utah Governor’s Office of Economic Development Board of Directors and elected officials from Iron County and Cedar City have approved financial incentives for MSC Aerospace and its subsidiaries SyberJet Aircraft and Metalcraft Technologies (MTI) totaling almost $45 million. MTI and SJA will use these incentives to expand their manufacturing facilities in Cedar City, Utah in support of the production of the SJ30 business jet.

In 2025, it was announced that SyberJet was acquired by a new investment group and a new executive team was installed, with Trevor Milton appointed as Chief Executive Officer. Under Milton's leadership the company announced the development of the SJ36, a nine‑seat light jet based on the earlier SJ30 platform, and indicated plans to enhance production, avionics, and propulsion capabilities. SyberJet also selected the Williams International FJ44-4A engines for the SJ36 program, citing performance and reliability.

On August 18, 2026, SyberJet said its SJ30-2 completed a nonstop flight from Jacksonville to San Diego in approximately four hours and seven minutes, averaging 505 miles per hour (813 km/h). SyberJet said the flight established a new east-to-west transcontinental speed record for the aircraft weight class, exceeding the 339 miles per hour (546 km/h) record set in 2013. The record has been submitted for certification by the National Aeronautic Association and Fédération Aéronautique Internationale, which is expected to take 90 days. Gordon "Gordy" Bryan piloted the SJ30-2, and SyberJet CEO Trevor Milton was aboard.
