= Swearingen SX-300 =

American kit light aircraft

SX300
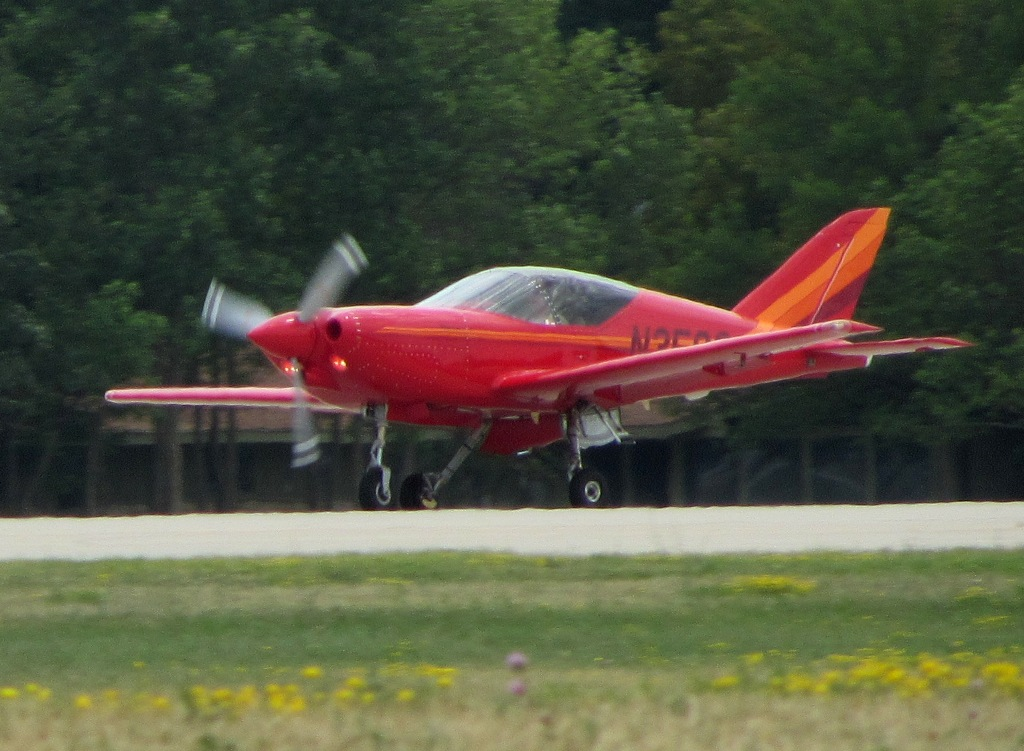

General information
- Type: Homebuilt aircraft
- National origin: United States
- Designer: Ed Swearingen
- Status: Kit production completed
- Number built: about 45

History
- Manufactured: 1984-1989
- First flight: July 1, 1984

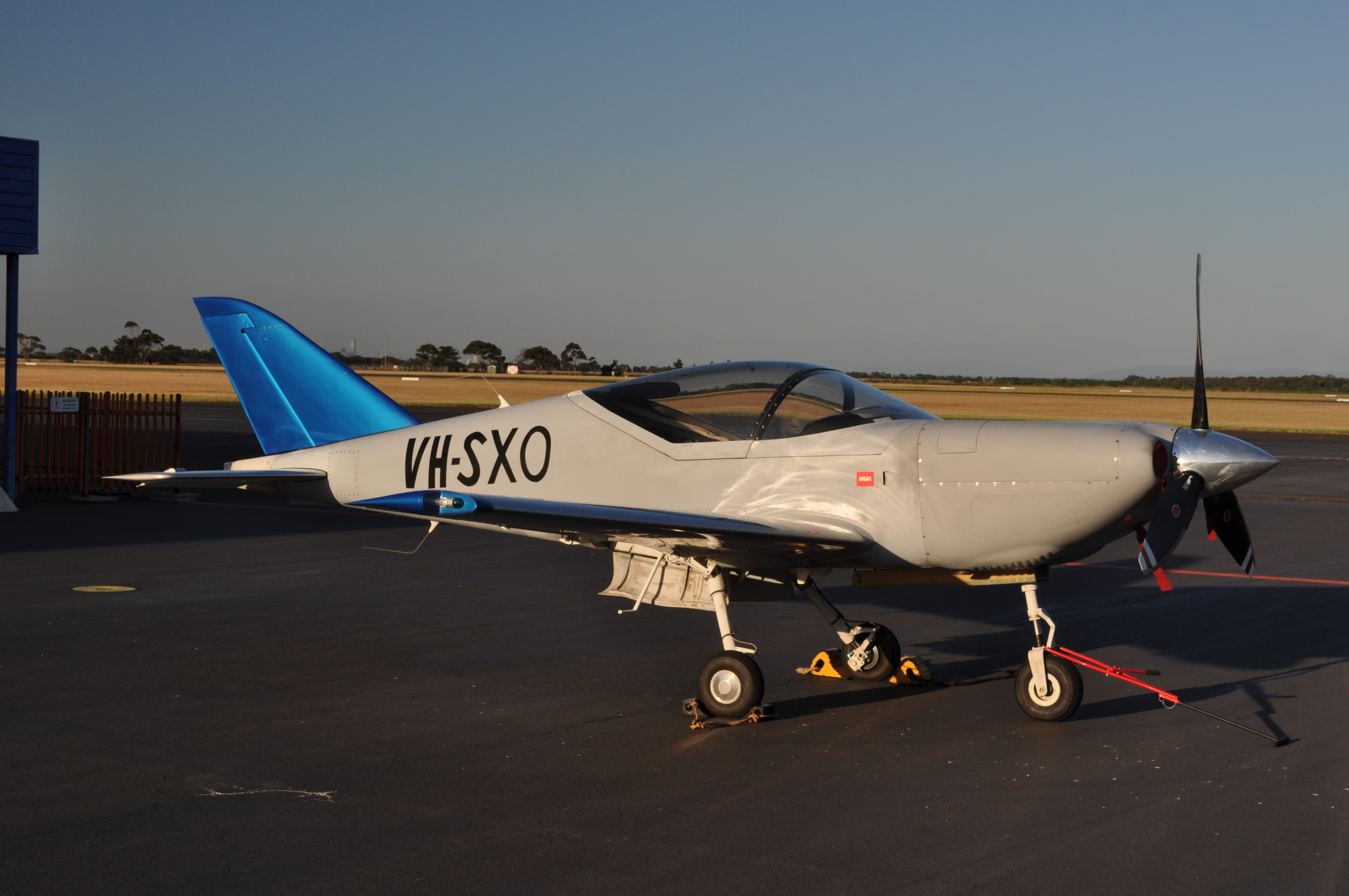
SX300 on the ramp

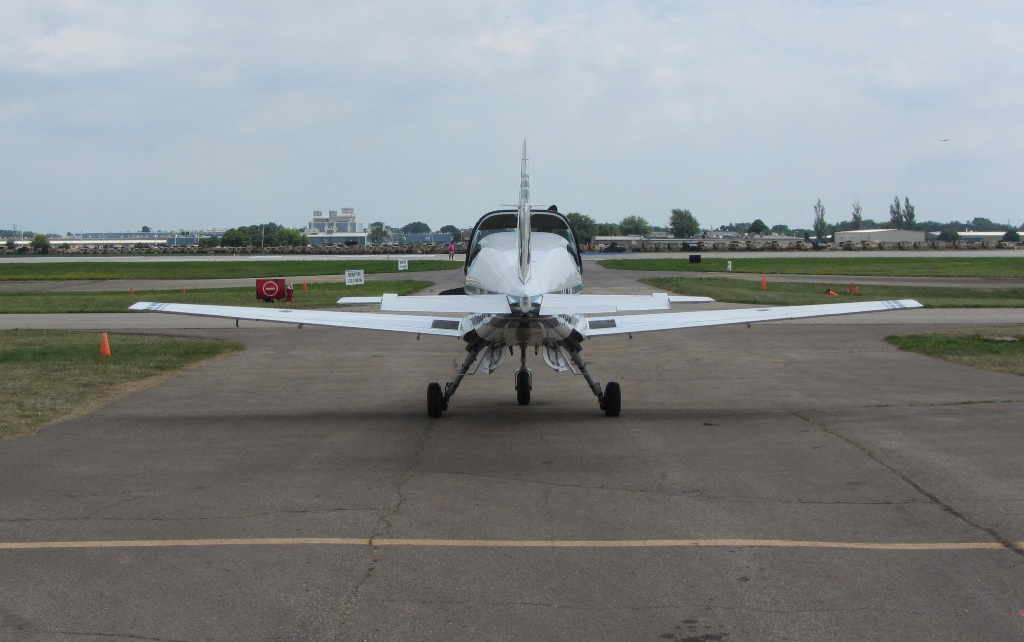
Rear of SX300 with canopy open

The Swearingen SX300 (unofficially known as the SX-300 or SX 300) is a high-performance homebuilt aircraft, featuring two seats and developed by Ed Swearingen during the 1980s.

The aircraft was offered as a kit, but this was not a comprehensive kit like contemporary designs, and its construction was beyond the abilities of the average amateur aircraft builder. The airplane features a 300 horsepower (220 kW) six-cylinder engine.

== Design and development ==
Citing the lack of advancement in aircraft performance since the 1930s, Swearingen started a new company to develop faster light aircraft designs. The new design was intended to be developed as a kit aircraft initially and then later to be type certified, although certification was never completed.

The aircraft was designed in 1983, first flown on July 1, 1984 and initially designated as the S29-300, for Swearingen, 29th design, 300 horsepower. The official company designation for the production kit aircraft is SX300, although some owners have registered them as SX-300 and SX 300.

The SX300 is fabricated from all-metal aluminum sheet, but with an emphasis on reducing aerodynamic drag. The wings are made from 0.040 in (1.02 mm) aluminum sheet, while the tail is 0.020 in (0.51 mm) sheet, with all metal joints butt-ended rather than overlapped and secured with countersunk rivets. The wing leading edge is stretch-formed over machine dies and then wrapped around the wing to achieve a smooth surface. The leading edge is reinforced with foam. The wing has a tapered planform, but with a straight leading edge. The fuselage has hydroformed structural members, with stringers and sheet metal covering. The wings have 3° of washout to improve the stall characteristics. The ailerons are differential and counter-weighted. The engine cowling is made from composite material and is based on Swearingen's design he employed in the Piper PA-30 Twin Comanche. The canopy is forward hinged and secured with six latches. The Lycoming IO-540 powerplant is mounted using a 7.25 in (18.42 cm) propeller extension and is offset 2° right and 1.5° down for P-factor effects. The fuel is contained in two wet wings and capacity is 30 U.S. gallons (110 L; 25 imp gal) per side. The tricycle landing gear is retractable rearwards and fuselage-mounted. The right hand main landing gear includes a retractable step. The aircraft is stressed for +6/-3 g.

Kits went on sale in 1986 and ceased sales in 1989. The company indicated that production ended due to lack of progress in type certifying the design, but Apfelbaum indicates "the more likely reason is that a turboprop prototype shed its wings, leading to a fatal accident during a demonstration, which ultimately diminished the interest of the military."

The kit was very difficult to construct, even for experienced builders, and many were not completed. It is estimated that 80 to 90 kits were sold but only 48 sets of landing gear were made. About 45 SX300s were actually completed and flown with about 30 reportedly still flying in 2023.

== Operational history ==
In a 2023 review for AVweb, Johnathan and Julia Apfelbaum concluded, "the SX300 doesn’t just look like a thoroughbred rocket ship of an aircraft—it really is. We would have to say this aircraft is certainly one of Swearingen’s finest achievements."

== Accidents and incidents ==
The design has had a high accident rate, with at least seven fatal accidents recorded by the US NTSB. At least five were also damaged in landing gear collapses due to failures of the landing gear main leg trunnions.

== Specifications (Swearingen SX300) ==
Data from Flying

General characteristics

- Capacity: 2
- Length: 21 ft 1.5 in (6.439 m)
- Wingspan: 24 ft 4.5 in (7.430 m)
- Height: 7 ft 6.5 in (2.299 m)
- Wing area: 70.73 sq ft (6.571 m^{2})
- Aspect ratio: 8.40
- Airfoil: NASA NLF(1)-0416
- Empty weight: 1,400–1,600 lb (635–726 kg) based on builder options
- Gross weight: 2,200 lb (998 kg)
- Max takeoff weight: 2,200–2,400 lb (998–1,089 kg) Experimental: utility or normal category
- Fuel capacity: 400lbs, 66gal useable.
- Powerplant: 1 × Lycoming IO-540 6-cyl. air-cooled horizontally-opposed piston engine, 300 hp (220 kW)
- Propellers: 3-bladed, 6 ft 2 in (1.88 m) diameter

Performance

- Maximum speed: 250 kn (290 mph, 460 km/h)
- Cruise speed: 230–245 kn (265–282 mph, 426–454 km/h) 75% power, altitude dependant
- Stall speed: 75–91 kn (86–105 mph, 139–169 km/h) landing configuration, clean
- Never exceed speed: 280 kn (320 mph, 520 km/h)
- Endurance: 3:23:00
- g limits: +6/-3
- Rate of climb: 2,400 ft/min (12 m/s)
- Wing loading: 31.10–33.93 lb/sq ft (151.8–165.7 kg/m^{2})
- Power/mass: 0.136
