= Normand Dube Aerocruiser =

Canadian homebuilt light aircraft

Aerocruiser
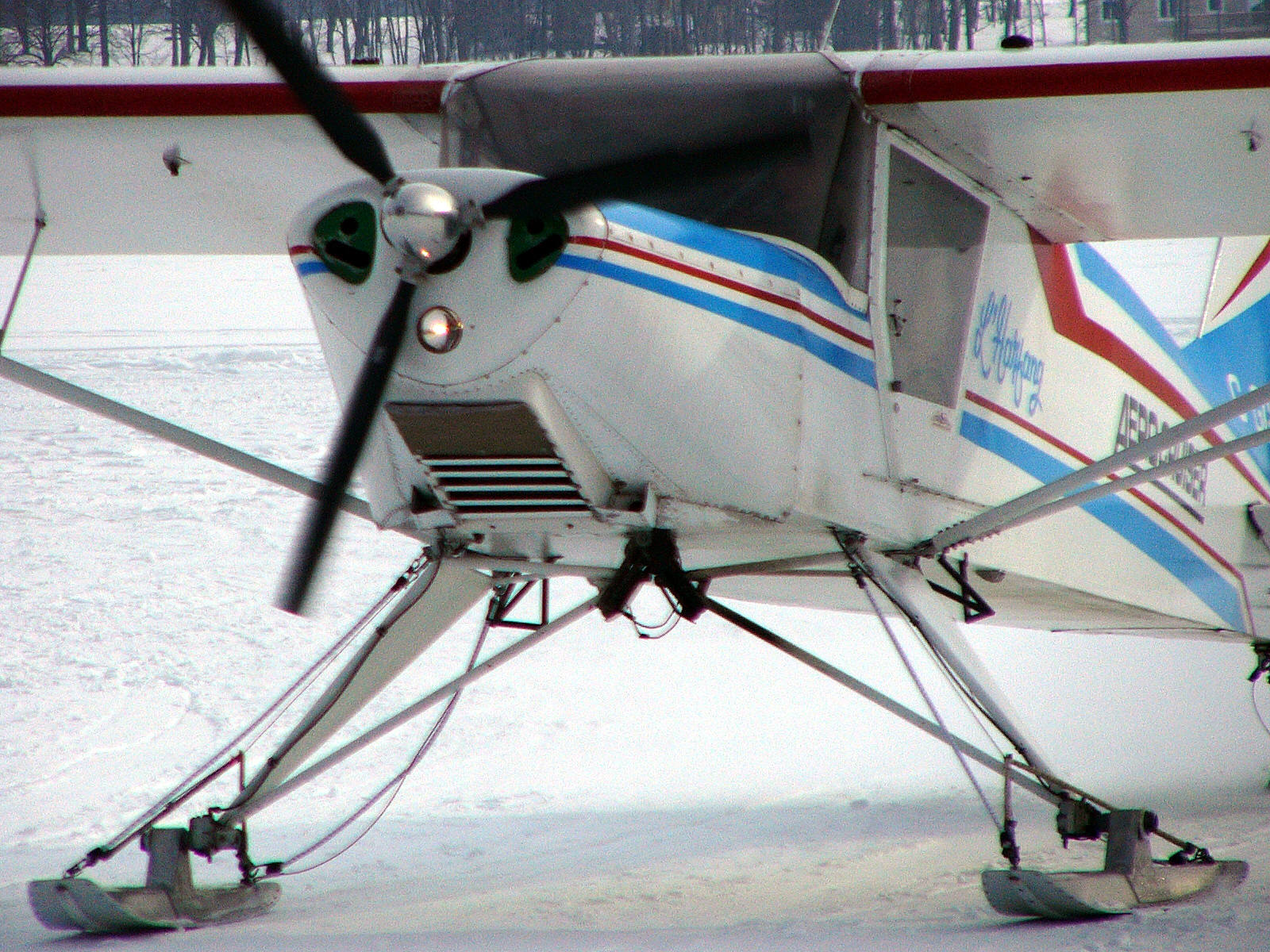
- Norman Dube Aerocruiser on straight skis

General information
- Type: Homebuilt utility monoplane
- National origin: Canada
- Manufacturer: Aviation Normand Dube
- Designer: Normand Dube
- Status: In production (2017)
- Number built: 100+ kits

History
- First flight: 1985
- Variants: Norman Dube Aerocruiser Plus; Norman Dube Aerocruiser 450 Turbo

The Normand Dube Aerocruiser is a Canadian single-engined, two-seat bushplane designed by Normand Dube and supplied as a kit for homebuilding by Aviation Normand Dube of Sainte-Anne-des-Plaines, Quebec.

== Design and development ==
The Aerocruiser 912 is a high-wing braced monoplane with a fixed tailwheel landing gear, the wheels can be quickly changed to skis if required. It has a welded steel tube fuselage and metal aluminium riveted wings and can take a variety of mainly Rotax piston engines. The aircraft has a gross weight of 1,232 lb (559 kg) and is powered by a 100 hp (75 kW) Rotax 912ULS engine, for the Canadian advanced ultralight category.

The design has been developed into Aerocruiser Plus, a four-seat version with a gross weight of 2,200 lb (998 kg) powered by a 180 hp (134 kW) Lycoming O-360 engine and the Aerocruiser 450 Turbo, a six-seat version with a gross weight of 4,650 lb (2,109 kg) powered by a 450 hp (336 kW) Lycoming TIGO-541 engine.

== Operational history ==
By March 2017, 56 examples had been registered with Transport Canada and one in the United States with the Federal Aviation Administration.

== Specifications (Aerocruiser 912S) ==
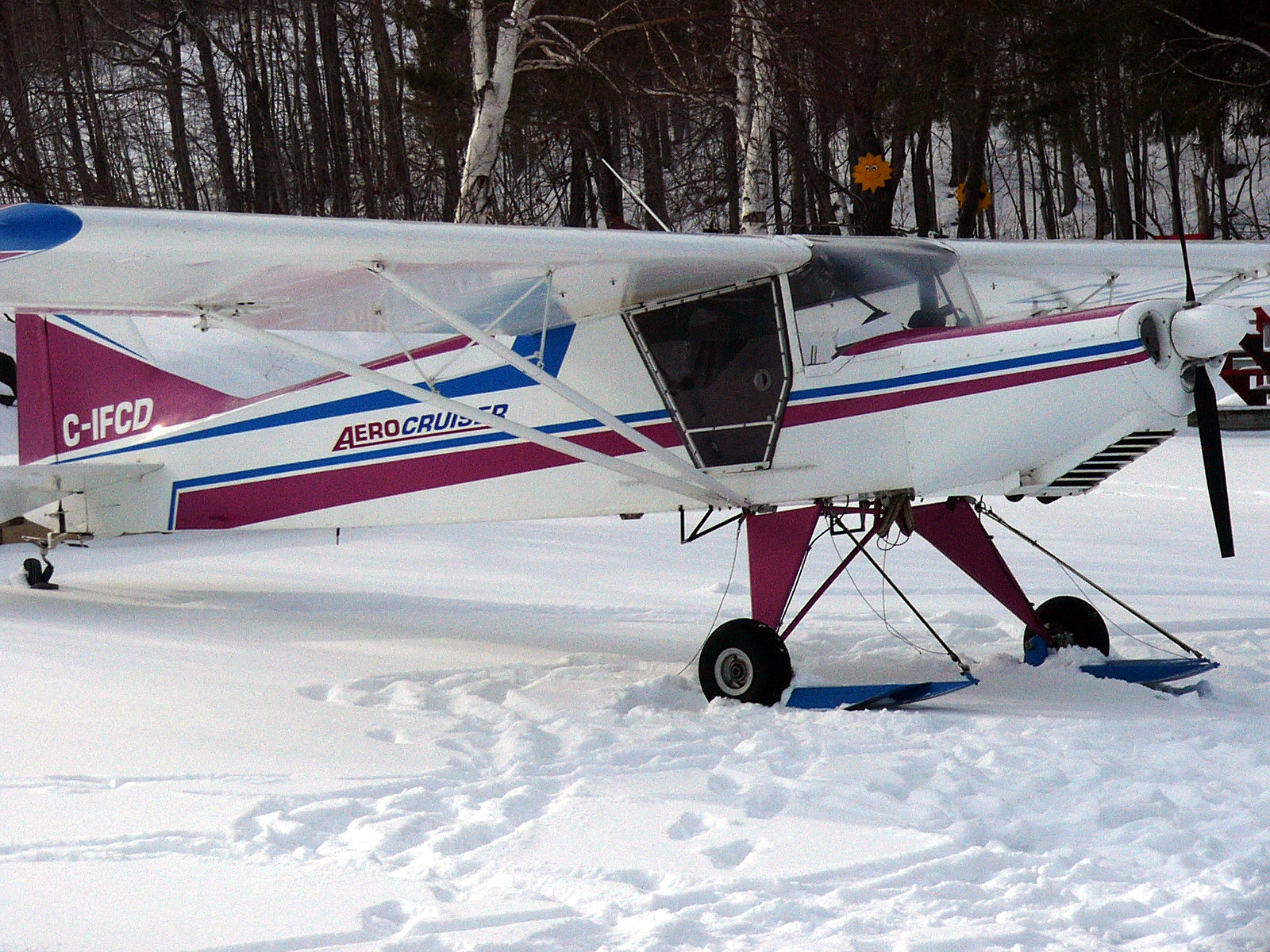
Norman Dube Aerocruiser on wheel-skis

Data from World Directory of Leisure Aviation

General characteristics

- Crew: one
- Capacity: one passenger
- Wingspan: 32 ft 0 in (9.75 m)
- Wing area: 160 sq ft (15 m^{2})
- Empty weight: 529 lb (240 kg)
- Max takeoff weight: 1,235 lb (560 kg)
- Powerplant: 1 × Rotax 912ULS horizontally-opposed, four-cylinder, piston engine, 100 hp (75 kW)
- Propellers: 2-bladed

Performance

- Maximum speed: 115 mph (185 km/h, 100 kn)
- Cruise speed: 85 mph (136 km/h, 73 kn)
- Stall speed: 32 mph (52 km/h, 28 kn)
- Rate of climb: 1,200 ft/min (6 m/s)
