= Normand Dube Aerocruiser 450 Turbo =

Canadian homebuilt aircraft

Aerocruiser 450 Turbo

General information
- Type: Amateur-built aircraft
- National origin: Canada
- Manufacturer: Aviation Normand Dube
- Designer: Normand Dube
- Status: In production (2015)
- Number built: one prototype

History
- Introduction date: 1997
- Developed from: Norman Dube Aerocruiser Plus

The Normand Dube Aerocruiser 450 Turbo is a six-seat Canadian amateur-built aircraft, designed by Normand Dube and produced by Aviation Normand Dube of Sainte-Anne-des-Plaines, Quebec. The aircraft is a development of the four-seat Norman Dube Aerocruiser Plus.

== Design and development ==
The Aerocruiser 450 Turbo features a strut-braced high-wing, a six-seat enclosed cabin accessed by doors, fixed conventional landing gear and a single engine in tractor configuration.

The aircraft is made with a welded 4130 steel tubing fuselage and a riveted 2024 aluminum wing. Its 39.25 ft (12.0 m) span wing has an area of 207 sq ft (19.2 m^{2}) and mounts flaps. The engine used on the prototype is a 450 hp (336 kW) turbocharged, geared and fuel-injected Lycoming TIGO-541 four-stroke powerplant.

== Operational history ==
Reviewers Roy Beisswenger and Marino Boric described the design in a 2015 review as "a two-ton giant".

By December 2018, one example, the prototype, had been registered with Transport Canada.

In December of 2014, the designer of the Aerocruiser 450 Turbo, Normand Dube, used his own aircraft to sabotage two of Hydro-Quebec's high-tension power lines, causing over 180,000 customers to lose electrical power. He was convicted for the attack in Quebec court in November 2018 and sentenced to seven years in prison for the attack. The aircraft used in the attack, the prototype Aerocruiser 450 Turbo, was seized as evidence.

== Specifications (Aerocruiser 450 Turbo) ==
Data from Bayerl, Tacke and the manufacturer

General characteristics

- Crew: one
- Capacity: five passengers
- Length: 35 ft (11 m)
- Wingspan: 39 ft 3 in (11.96 m)
- Height: 14 ft 1 in (4.29 m) (tail level)
- Wing area: 207 sq ft (19.2 m^{2})
- Empty weight: 3,040 lb (1,379 kg)
- Gross weight: 4,650 lb (2,109 kg)
- Fuel capacity: 522 litres (115 imp gal; 138 US gal)
- Powerplant: 1 × Lycoming TIGO-541 six cylinder, air-cooled, turbocharged, geared and fuel-injected four stroke aircraft engine, 450 hp (340 kW)
- Propellers: 3-bladed Hartzell Propeller

Performance

- Cruise speed: 200 kn (230 mph, 370 km/h) at 75% power and 25,000 feet
- Stall speed: 54 kn (62 mph, 100 km/h)
- Range: 1,400 nmi (1,600 mi, 2,600 km)
- Service ceiling: 35,000 ft (11,000 m)
- Rate of climb: 1,800 ft/min (9.1 m/s)
- Wing loading: 13.6 lb/sq ft (66.4 kg/m^{2})
