= Moynet Jupiter =

1960s small executive transport plane

M 360 Jupiter
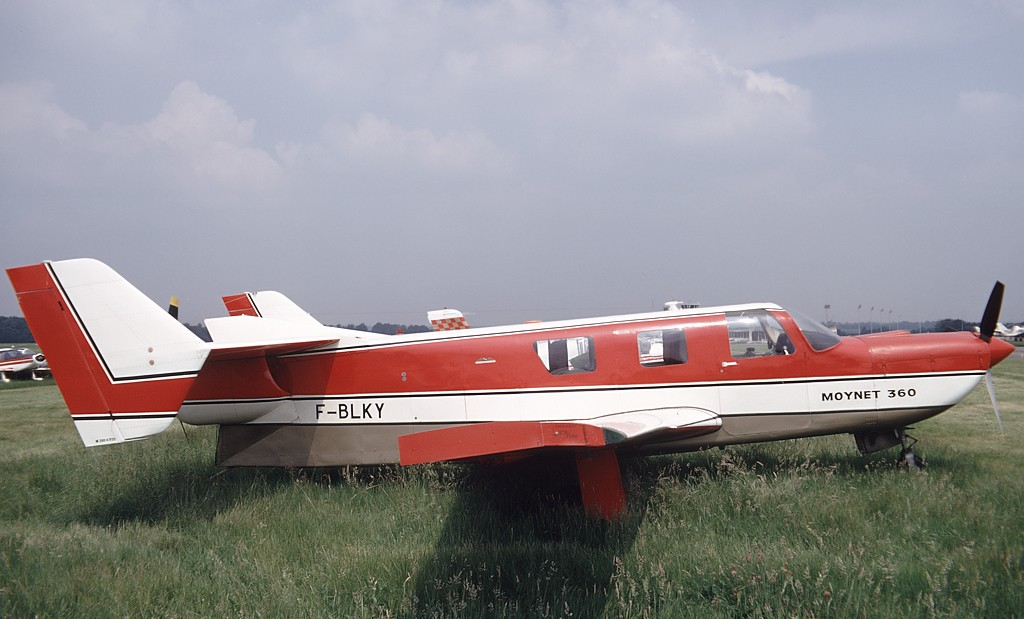
- The Moynet 360-6 second prototype Jupiter at Toussus-le-Noble airfield near Paris in June 1971. (Rear propeller is hidden by starboard fin.)

General information
- Type: Executive transport
- National origin: France
- Manufacturer: Engins Matra/Sud Aviation
- Designer: André Moynet
- Number built: 2

History
- First flight: 17 December 1963

The Moynet M 360 Jupiter is a small executive transport built in France in the 1960s. It had an unusual twin-push-pull, single-fuselage configuration. Two prototypes were produced, the second with more power and seating, but no sales resulted.

== Design and development ==
Some civil propeller driven aircraft that have used one or more pairs of engines in push-pull configuration have been flying boats, with engines mounted above the wing and clear of spray. Others have had a pair of engines, one at either end of a pod fuselage with a tail unit mounted on a pair of booms, for example the Cessna Skymaster, the Adam A500 or the Rutan Voyager. The Moynet 360 Jupiter was an example of a push-pull aircraft of a less common configuration, where a single conventional fuselage has an engine at either end; the Dornier Do 335 fighter used the same arrangement. For light civil aircraft, the aim was to combine the performance of a conventional twin-engined aircraft with the ease of handling of a single-engined one.

The Jupiter was an executive transport with between four and seven seats, depending on engine power. It was designed by André Moynet, a member of the National Assembly of France and a former government minister, while also a test-pilot, and built by S.S. Engins Matra (so it is sometimes referred to as the Matra Moynet Jupiter), the first prototype flying on 17 December 1963 with the designer and Lucien Tieles at the controls. Its wing had a straight trailing edge, but the centre section had strong taper on the leading edge which continued more weakly outboard. It was of two spar, stressed skin construction, carrying mass balanced ailerons and slotted flaps. The main undercarriage legs, placed at the end of the centre section each carried a single wheel and retracted inwards electrically. A retractable nosewheel completed the landing gear.

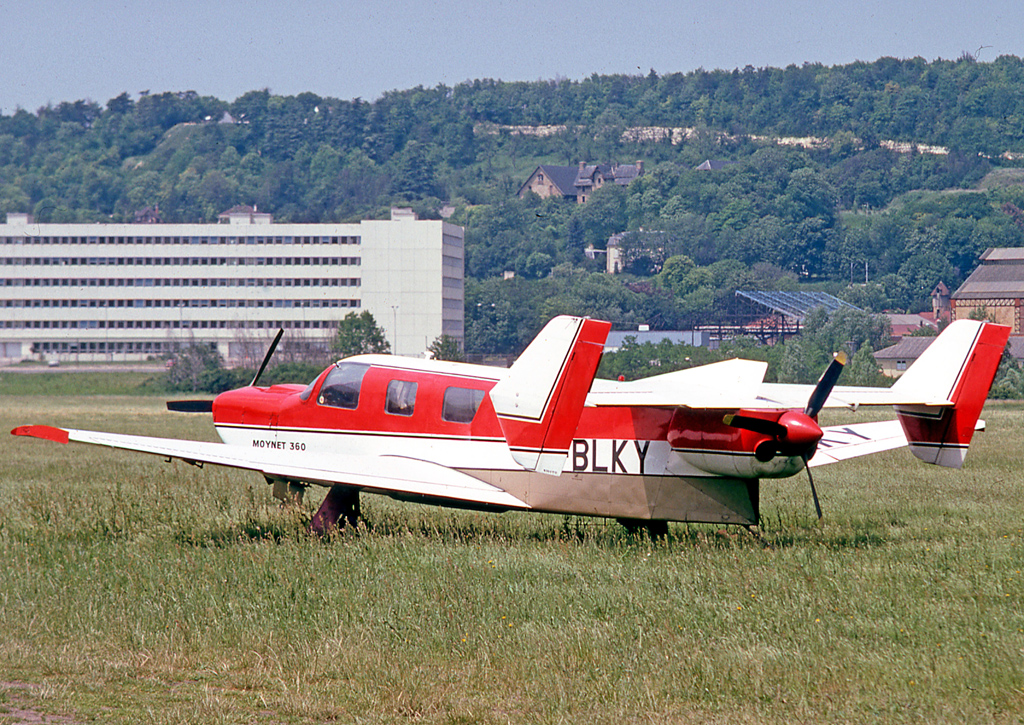
The 360-6 Jupiter showing the fore and aft arrangement of the two engines with the rear power unit set between the twin fins.

One horizontally opposed Lycoming engine was conventionally placed in the nose. Behind it was a standard cabin, though the front seats were further ahead of the leading edge than usual because of the rearward shift of the centre of gravity caused by the rear engine. There were three large windows on each side. For the same reason the rear fuselage was quite short, and it lacked the normal taper, giving it a boxy look, so that the second, pusher Lycoming could be mounted in the extreme tail. This was cooled by air from rectangular intakes on the upper sides of the rear fuselage. The straight edged, tapered tailplane was mounted on the fuselage top above the engine, with small endplate fins carrying balanced rudders. These fins extended above and below the tailplane, with arrow shaped leading edges and straight, swept trailing edges. There was also a long, shallow strake over the rear fuselage. Seen from below, the long span of the tailplane was striking, about 44% of that of the wings; the elevators filled most of the outer part of its trailing edge, avoiding the propeller airstream.

Only two Jupiters were built. The first, designated 360-4 and initially registered as F-WLKE had two 200 hp (150 kW) Lycoming IO-360-A1A engines driving two-bladed propellers and was configured as a 4-5 seater.

The second prototype was of a more powerful and slightly larger variant designated the model 360-6; it first flew on 25 May 1965. This model had a choice of engines, either 290 hp (216 kW) Lycoming IO-540 six cylinder engines driving constant speed, three-bladed propellers, or 310 hp (231 kW) Lycoming TIO-541 engines. The span was increased by 0.37 m (15 in) and length by 0.64 m (25 in). The increased length allowed seats for 6/7, with two rows of two single seats and a bench seat at the rear that could accommodate 2 or 3. The cabin was sound-proofed and air conditioned and could be pressurised. Access was via a forward starboard side door. There was baggage space behind the cabin with its own external door. The sole 360-6 was registered as F-WLKY.

The intention was for Sud-Aviation to produce the 360-6 Jupiter as the Sud-Aviation M 360-6 Jupiter. An order was obtained from the French government for some 360-6 pre-production aircraft, but this seems to have been cancelled. Despite sales campaigns in Europe and the United States no further orders resulted.

The first prototype is now in the reserve collection of the Musée de l'Air et de l'Espace, Le Bourget Airport, Paris museum and the second in the Musée Regional de l'Air, Angers - Loire Airport, France, having been restored to flying condition in 2018. At le Bourget, the 360-4 bears the normal French registration F-BLKE rather than the French prototype style F-WLKE.

== Variants ==
M 360-4 Jupiter
First prototype, 4–5 seats, two 149 kW (200 hp) Lycoming IO-360 engines.
M 360-6
Second prototype, with stretched fuselage with seven seats and two 216 kW (290 hp) Lycoming IO-540 engines.
M 360-6P
Proposed pressurised seven-seat version, with Lycoming O-480 engines. Unbuilt.
Sud-Aviation Présidence
Further enlarged, pressurised version planned by Sud-Aviation.

== Specifications (360-6, Lycoming IO-540) ==
Data from Taylor 1966, pp. 60–1

General characteristics

- Capacity: 6 or 7 including crew
- Length: 8.77 m (28 ft 9 in)
- Wingspan: 11.49 m (37 ft 8 in)
- Height: 2.46 m (8 ft 1 in)
- Wing area: 16.81 m^{2} (180.9 sq ft)
- Empty weight: 1,338 kg (2,950 lb)
- Gross weight: 2,390 kg (5,269 lb)
- Fuel capacity: 566 L
- Powerplant: 2 × Lycoming IO-540 6-cylinder horizontally opposed air cooled, 216 kW (290 hp) each
- Propellers: 3-bladed Hartzell constant speed

Performance

- Maximum speed: 363 km/h (226 mph, 196 kn) at sea level. All performance figures estimates at maximum take-off weight.
- Cruise speed: 338 km/h (210 mph, 183 kn) at 1,830 m (6,000 ft) on 75% power
- Range: 2,060 km (1,280 mi, 1,110 nmi) at 4,500 m(15,000 ft) and 45% power.
- Rate of climb: 7.3 m/s (1,440 ft/min) at sea level

== See also ==
Aircraft of comparable role, configuration, and era

- Cessna Skymaster
- Adam A500
