= Beechcraft Travel Air =

Light, twin-engined piston aircraft produced 1958–1968

Model 95 Travel Air
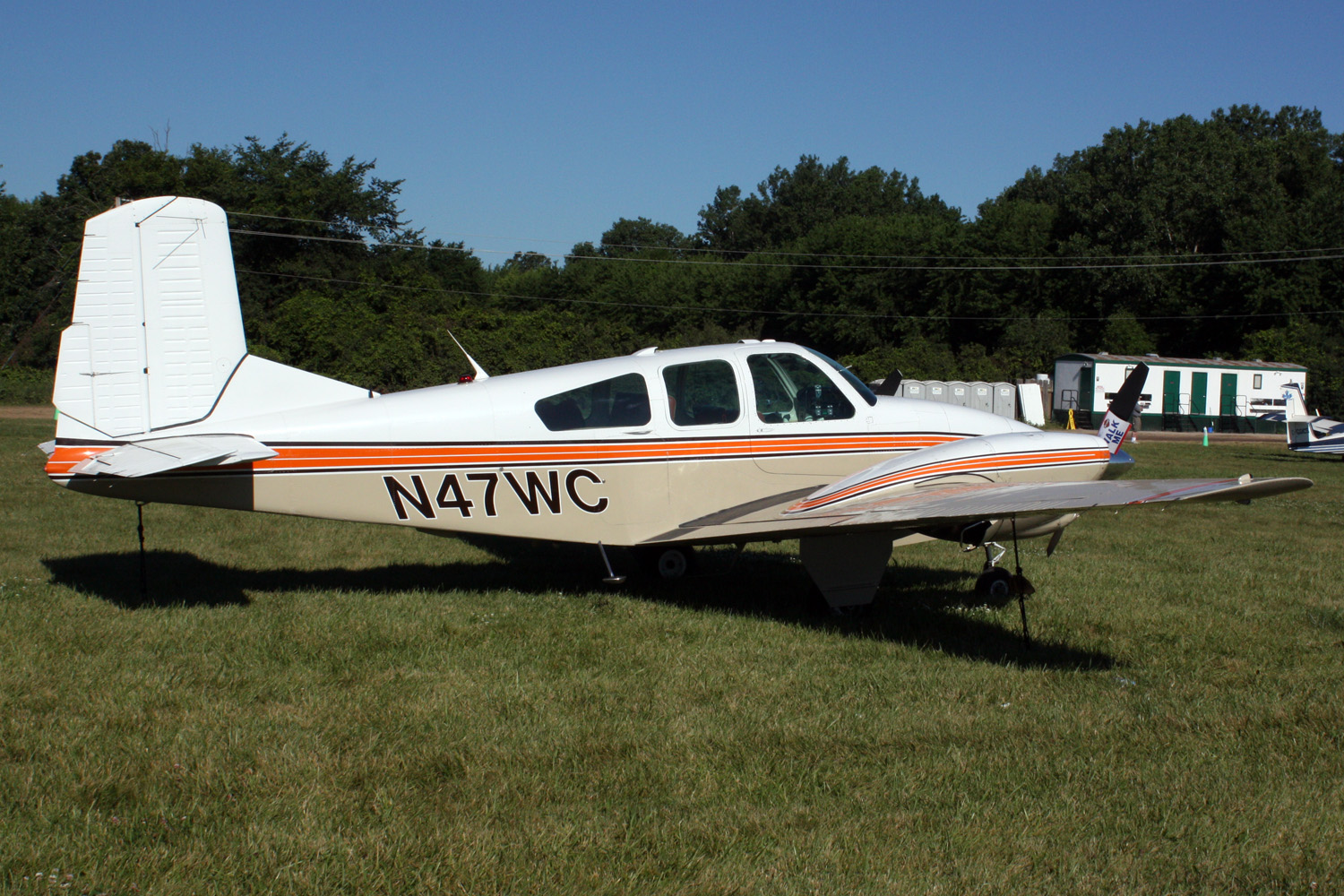
- 1959 Model 95 at AirVenture 2008, Oshkosh, Wisconsin

General information
- Type: Light twin aircraft
- National origin: United States
- Manufacturer: Beechcraft
- Status: In service
- Number built: 720

History
- Manufactured: 1958–1968
- Introduction date: 1958
- First flight: August 6, 1956
- Developed from: Beechcraft Bonanza
- Variants: Beechcraft Baron

The Beechcraft Travel Air is a twin-engine development of the Beechcraft Bonanza. It was designed to fill the gap between the single engine Model 35 Bonanza and the much larger Model 50 Twin Bonanza, and ultimately served as the basis for its replacement, the Baron.

== Design and development ==
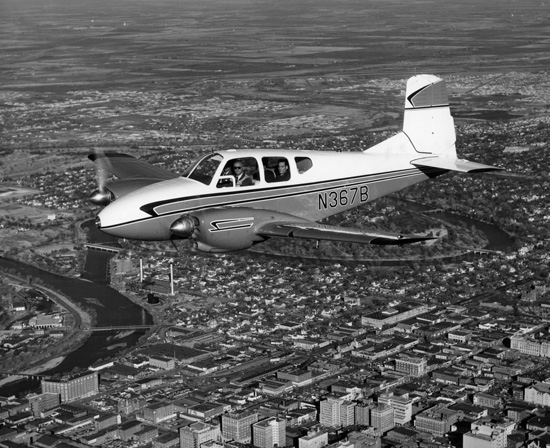
A Beechcraft Model 95 in flight

Designed as a competitor to the Cessna 310 and the Piper Apache, the Travel Air (developed as the Badger) took many design features from previous Beechcraft airplanes. It took its basic design from the Model 35 Bonanza, fitted with the vertical stabilizer from the T-34 Mentor, and two four-cylinder engines. Its wing spar was borrowed from the large Model 50 Twin Bonanza, along with thicker gauge aluminum on the leading edge; landing gear systems had been taken from the United States Navy Mentor, which was a stronger structure built for training pilots for later aircraft carrier landings. Power came from, in the 1958 model year, two Lycoming O-360-A1A at 180 horsepower (130 kW) at 2700rpm each. With 75% power, the Travel Air was capable of 200 mph (170 kn; 320 km/h) at 7,500ft.

Although developed and initially marketed as the Badger, a 1956 letter from the United States Air Force notified Beechcraft that the name had been previously chosen as a reporting name for the Soviet Tupolev Tu-16 bomber; therefore, Beechcraft elected to reuse the Travel Air name, which came from the predecessor company to Beechcraft, the Travel Air Manufacturing Company. Beechcraft set in initial pricing of the Travel Air at $49,500; $10,450 below Cessna's 310 price, yet still $13,510 higher than Piper's Apache pricing.

== Variants ==
During its ten-year model run, between 1958 and 1968, the Travel Air saw four distinct variants emerge. All use the ICAO aircraft type designator BE95.

=== Model 95 ===
The initial model was built for the 1958 and 1959 model years; the 1959 model had a fifth 'jumpseat' added. A total production of the 95 for 1958 and 1959 were 173 and 128, respectively.

=== Model B95/B95A ===
Changes in the B95 version included a 19-inch (480 mm) cabin stretch to increase rear cabin area and the horizontal stabilizer and elevators were enlarged for better pitch control. A curved vertical stabilizer dorsal fairing is the most noticeable change. It also included a fifth seat, wider chord flaps, and an increased gross weight of 100 lb (45 kg). The 1961 Model B95A featured fuel injected Lycoming IO-360-B1A engines. A total of 150 B95s were built in 1960, and 81 B95As were built between 1961 and 1962 (serial numbers TD-453 through TD-533). The 1960 model was priced at $51,500 and the 1961–62 model was priced at $49,500.

=== Model D95A ===
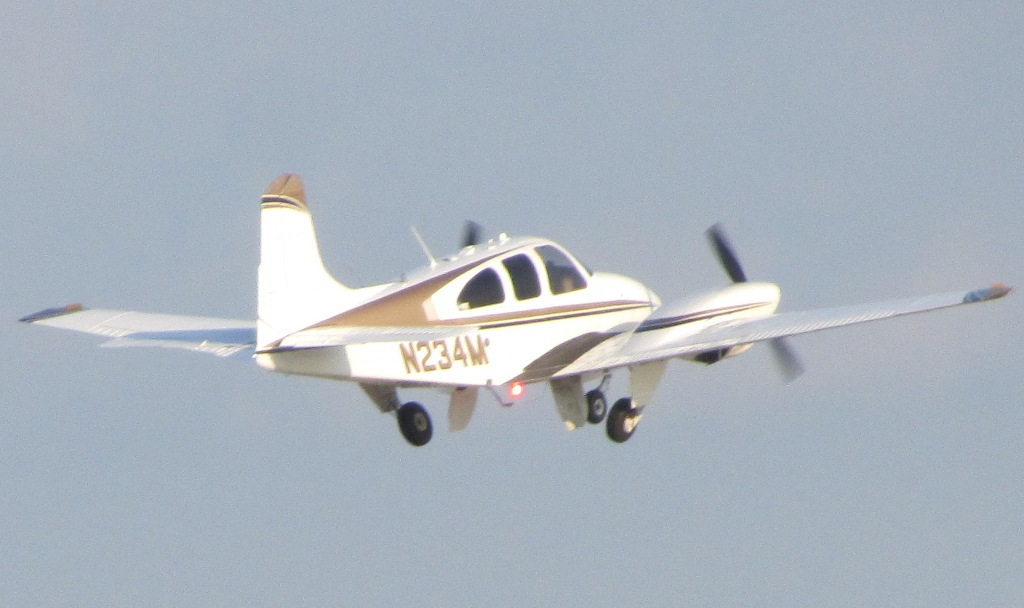
1963 Beechcraft D95A

In 1963 the Travel Air featured a larger rear window that is common with the Model A55/B55 Barons. The nose cone was lengthened for improved baggage space. Interior features such as the instrument panel and heaters were redesigned. There were a total of 174 D95s built between 1963 and 1967.

=== Model E95 ===
The E95 featured a one piece, 'speed-slope' windshield and a more pointed spinner design. The interior design was fully re-done. A total of 14 Model E95s were built in 1968; with pricing of $53,500. The production drop off was due to the more costly but faster and powerful Model 55 Baron (developed from the Model 95, and initially designated Model 95-55).

== Specifications (D95A) ==
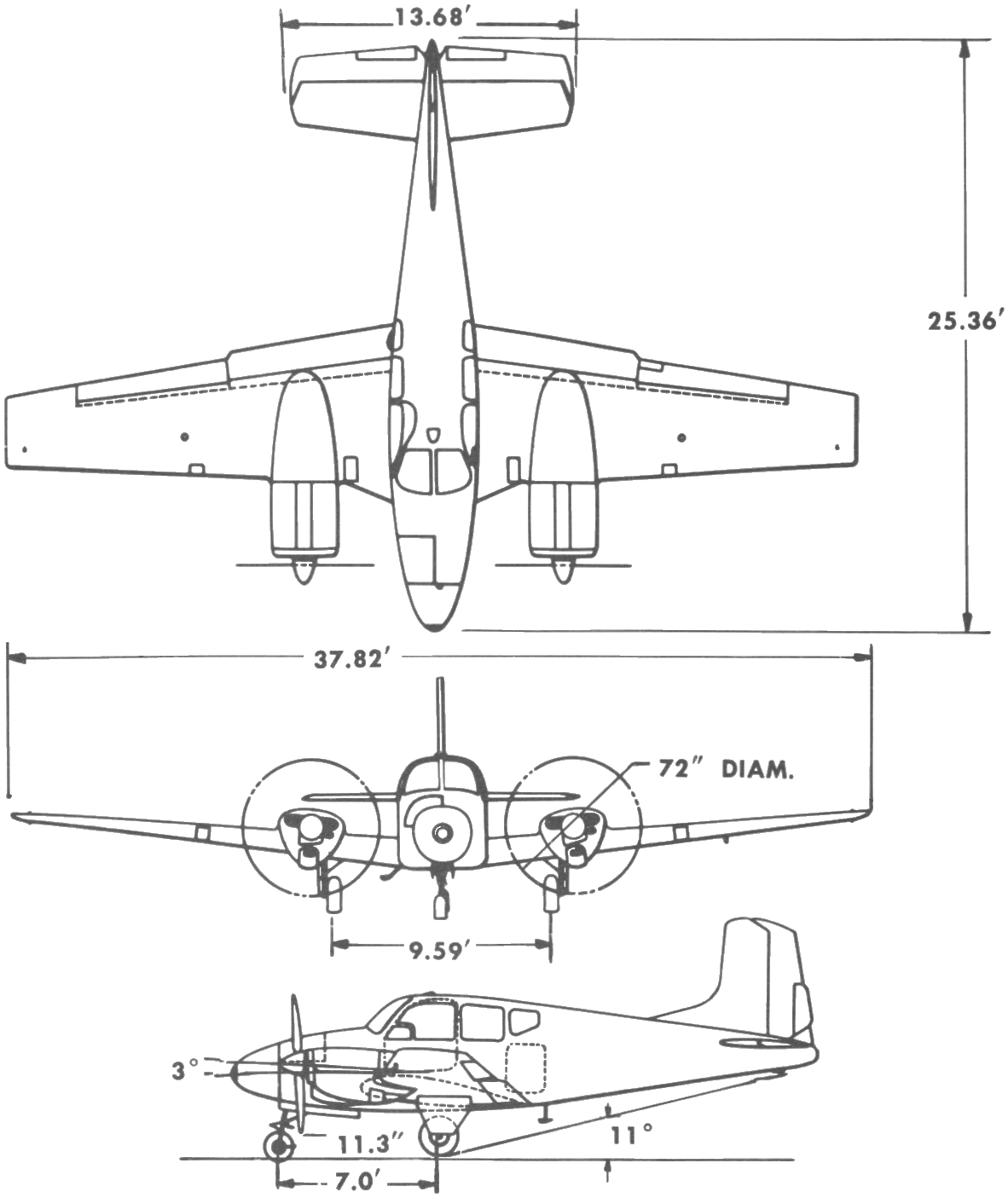
3-view line drawing of the Beechcraft B95 Travel Air

Data from Janes's All The World's Aircraft 1965–66

General characteristics

- Crew: 1
- Capacity: 4 passengers
- Length: 25 ft 11 in (7.90 m)
- Wingspan: 37 ft 10 in (11.53 m)
- Height: 9 ft 6 in (2.90 m)
- Wing area: 199.2 sq ft (18.51 m^{2})
- Aspect ratio: 7.16:1
- Empty weight: 2,555 lb (1,159 kg)
- Max takeoff weight: 4,200 lb (1,905 kg)
- Fuel capacity: 112 US gal (420 L; 93 imp gal)
- Powerplant: 2 × Lycoming IO-360-B1B air-cooled flat-four, 180 hp (130 kW) each
- Propellers: 2-bladed Hartzell Type 8447-12 constant-speed propellers, 6 ft 0 in (1.83 m) diameter

Performance

- Maximum speed: 180 kn (210 mph, 340 km/h) at sea level
- Cruise speed: 169 kn (195 mph, 314 km/h) at 11,000 ft (3,400 m) (econ. cruise (65% power))
- Stall speed: 61 kn (70 mph, 110 km/h) (flaps 28 degrees, gear down, zero thrust)
- Never exceed speed: 210 kn (240 mph, 390 km/h)
- Range: 884 nmi (1,017 mi, 1,637 km) (50% power)
- Service ceiling: 18,100 ft (5,500 m)
- Rate of climb: 1,250 ft/min (6.4 m/s)
- Takeoff distance to 50 ft (15 m): 1,280 ft (390 m)
- Landing distance from 50 ft (15 m): 1,590 ft (485 m)

== See also ==
- Bay Super V Bonanza

Related development

- Beechcraft Baron
- Beechcraft Bonanza
- Beechcraft T-34 Mentor

Aircraft of comparable role, configuration, and era

- Piper Apache
- Cessna 310
