= Aviation Normand Dube =

Canadian aircraft manufacturer

Aviation Normand Dube Inc.
- Type: Privately held company
- Industry: Aerospace
- Founded: 1982
- Headquarters: Sainte-Anne-des-Plaines, Quebec, Canada
- Key people: Normand Dube
- Products: Light aircraft
- Services: Helicopter sales, machining
- Website: www.aviationnormanddube.com

Aviation Normand Dube is a Canadian aircraft manufacturer based in Sainte-Anne-des-Plaines, Quebec and founded by Normand Dube. The company specializes in the design and manufacture of ultralight and light aircraft in the form of kits for amateur construction and ready-to-fly aircraft.

The company was founded in 1982 as a machine shop and metal fabricator. In 2011 a Robinson Helicopter Company dealership and repair centre was added in Grand Falls, New Brunswick, selling the Robinson R44 and carrying out repairs to the R44 and Robinson R22.

The company's first aircraft was introduced in 1985, the two-seat Normand Dube Aerocruiser for the Canadian advanced ultralight category. In 1988 this was enlarged to become the four-seat Normand Dube Aerocruiser Plus and in 1997 the six-seat Normand Dube Aerocruiser 450 Turbo was added to the line.

In November 2018 the company founder and owner, Normand Dubé, was convicted in Quebec court of criminal charges after his use of an Aerocruiser homebuilt to carry out an attack on Hydro Quebec's powerline infrastructure. In December 2020 he fled while on bail and was believed to be in hiding.

In February 2021, Dubé turned himself in.

== Aircraft ==
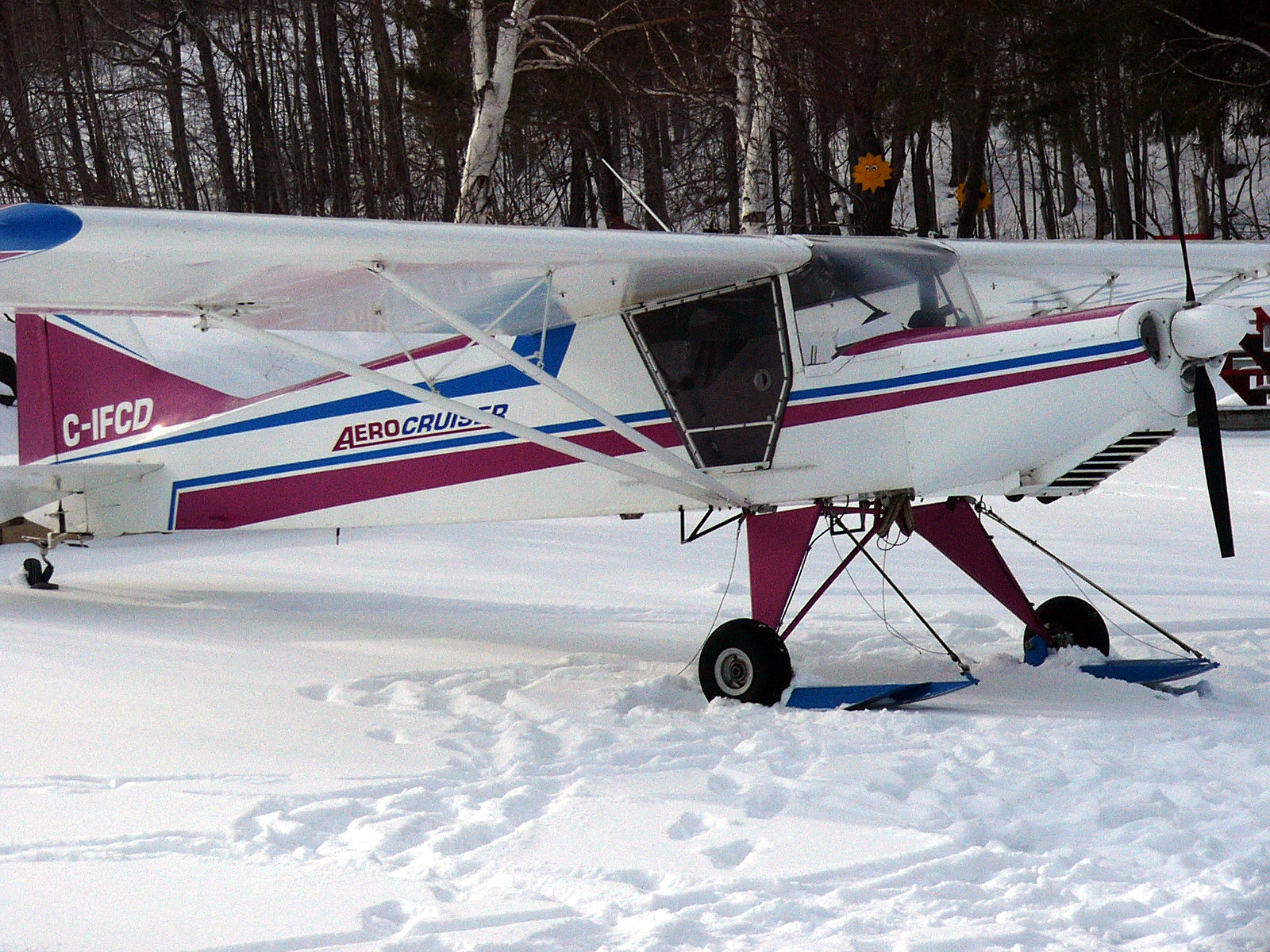
Normand Dube Aerocruiser on skis

Summary of aircraft built by Aviation Normand Dube:

- Normand Dube Aerocruiser (1985)
- Normand Dube Aerocruiser Plus (1988)
- Normand Dube Aerocruiser 450 Turbo (1997)
