= Beechcraft Duke =

Pressurized, twin-engined piston aircraft produced 1968–1983

Duke
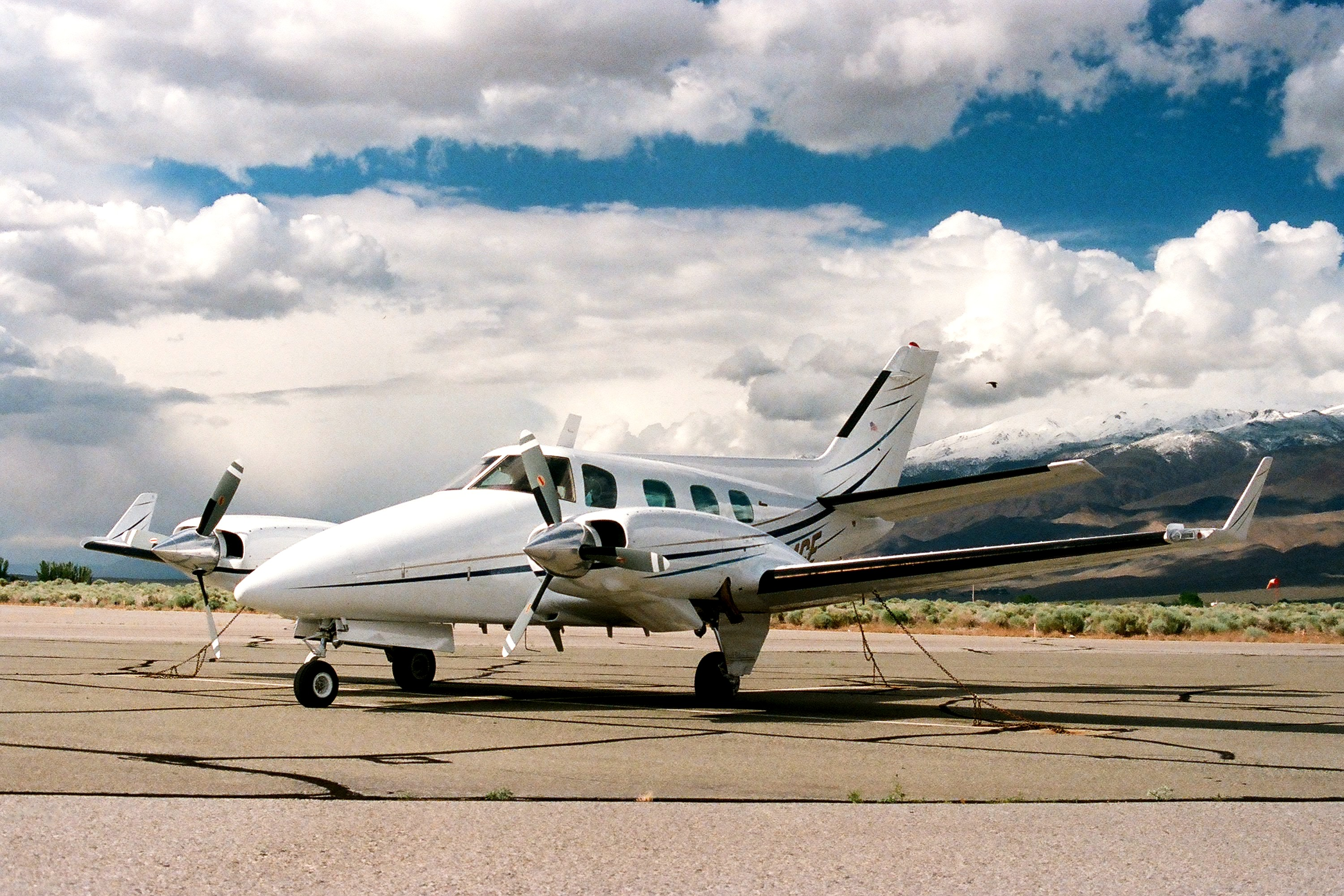

General information
- Type: Light aircraft
- Manufacturer: Beechcraft
- Number built: 596

History
- Manufactured: 1968–1983
- Introduction date: July 1968
- First flight: December 29, 1966

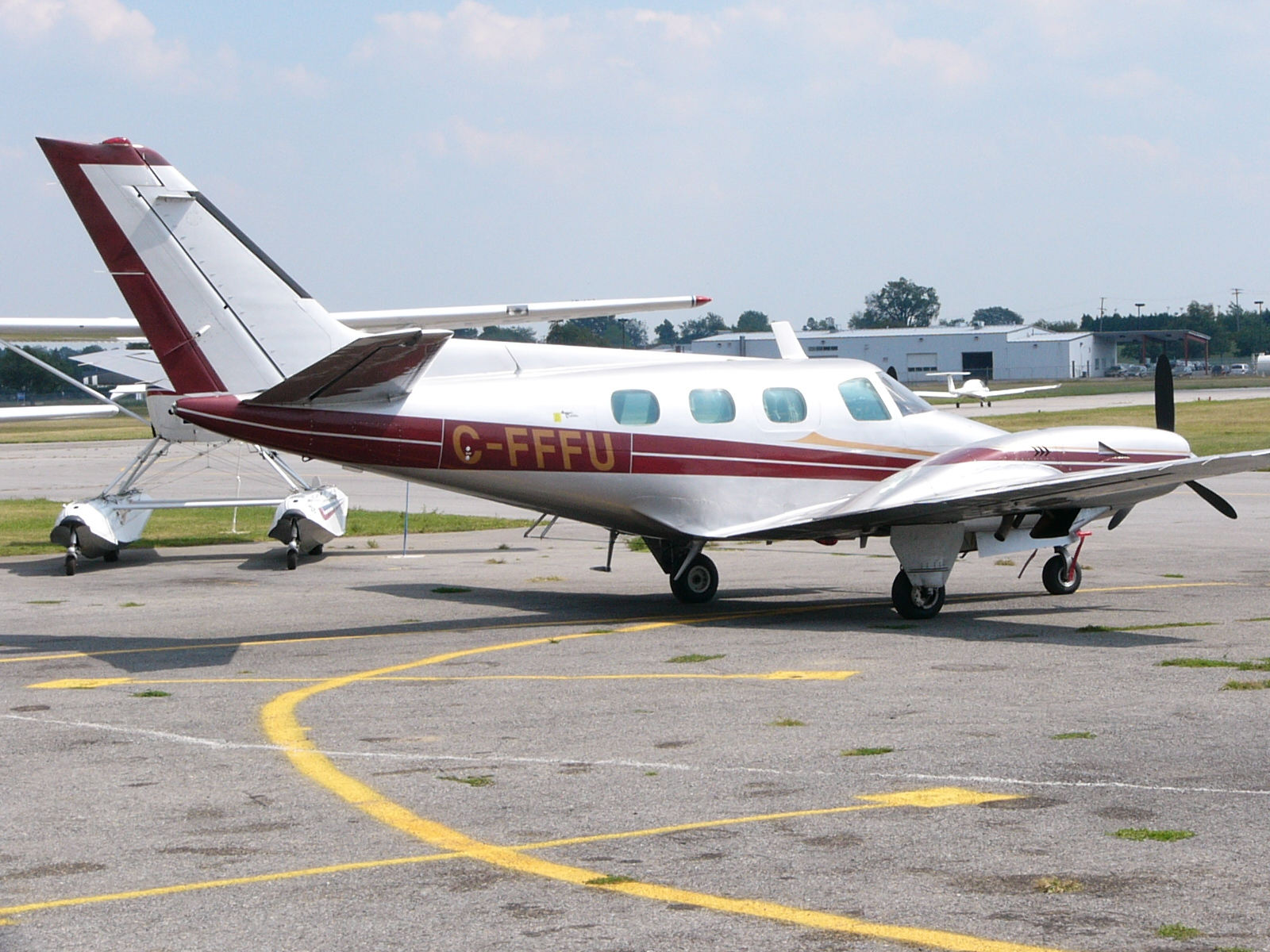
Three-quarter rear view of a Beechcraft 60 Duke showing the highly swept stabilizer

The Beechcraft 60 Duke is an American-built twin-engine, piston-driven fixed-wing aircraft designed and produced by Beechcraft. The aircraft has retractable tricycle landing gear and a pressurized cabin. The engines are turbocharged, which also pressurize the cabin with bleed air.

== Design ==
Development of the Beechcraft 60 began in early 1965, which was designed to fill the gap between the Beechcraft Baron and the Beechcraft Queen Air. On December 29, 1966, the prototype made its first flight. On February 1, 1968, the FAA issued the type certificate. Distribution to customers began in July 1968. The passenger cabin is fitted with club seating and entry is by means of a port-side airstair entry door in the rear fuselage.

The Beechcraft A60, which came onto the market in 1970, represented an advancement over the Baron, with an improved pressurized cabin utilizing advanced bonded honeycomb construction, lighter and more efficient turbochargers, and improved elevators. The last variant, the B60, was introduced in 1974. The interior arrangement was renewed and the engine efficiency again increased by improved turbochargers. The Beechcraft 60 was, despite its very good performance, only a moderate seller, principally because the complicated technology demanded a high expenditure on maintenance. Production was stopped in 1983.

Most of the Duke B-60s still flying have retained their original equipment. Electro-mechanical systems, which were highly advanced when the aircraft was introduced, were superseded in other aircraft with simpler I/C controlled mechanical parts. The aircraft design uses turbocharged Lycoming TIO541-B4 engines that develop 380 horsepower (280 kilowatts) each. Other systems, parts, and FAA-certified technicians are increasingly difficult to locate. Normally, pilots figure 45 gallons per hour (170 L/h), plus another 40 US gal (150 L) for each takeoff and climb as typical fuel consumption for cross-country planning. Owners compare the Beechcraft B60 to classic sports cars—noting that they do not fly Dukes to economize.

=== Modifications ===
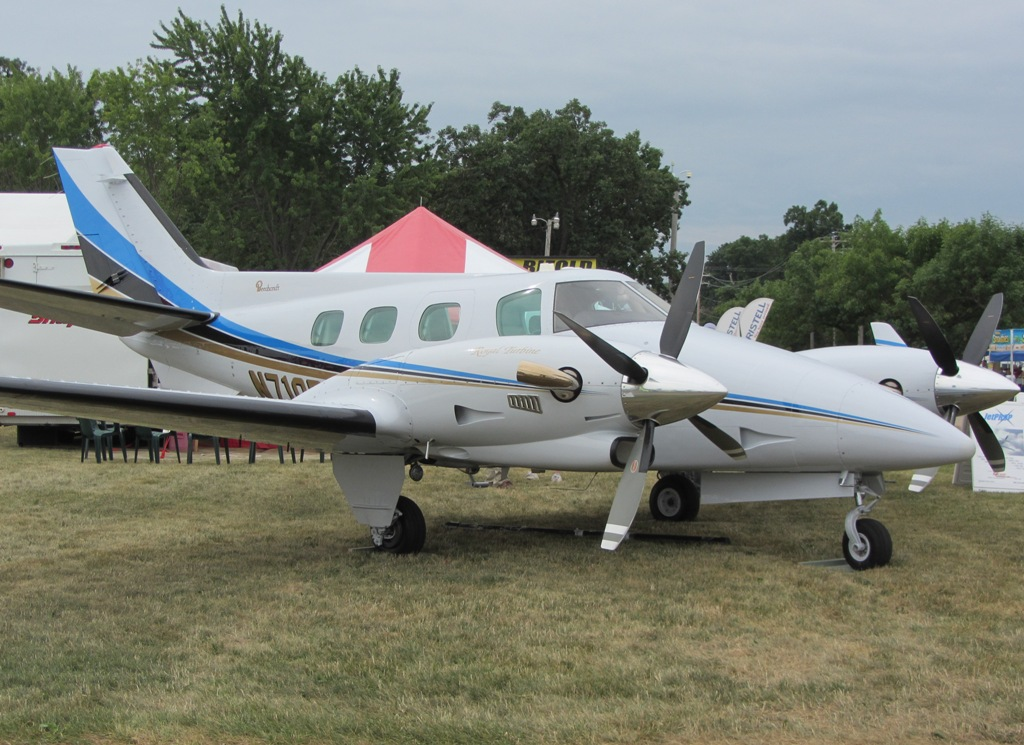
Rocket Engineering Duke conversion

Some Dukes have been modified by Rocket Engineering of Spokane, Washington, replacing the Lycoming piston engines with Pratt & Whitney Canada PT6A-21 or -35 turboprops. Called the Royal Turbine Duke conversion, the modification increases fuel capacity by 28 US gal (110 L) and the maximum useful load by 400 lb (180 kg). The take-off length required is shortened by over 1,500 ft (460 m) to only 1,000 ft (300 m) and the landing distance is reduced by over 2,000 ft (610 m) to only 900 ft (270 m). The maximum rate of climb is increased from 1,600 to 4,000 ft/min (500 to 1,200 m/min), reducing the time to climb to 25,000 ft (7,600 m) from 25 to 9 minutes. The cruise speed is increased to 290 knots (540 km/h) at 29,000 ft (8,800 m). The modification does have some disadvantages as it increases fuel burn from 56 to 66 gal/h (210 to 250 L/h) and lowers the certified ceiling from 30,000 to 28,000 ft (9,100 to 8,500 m). The supplemental type certificate was issued on May 12, 2006.

== Operational history ==
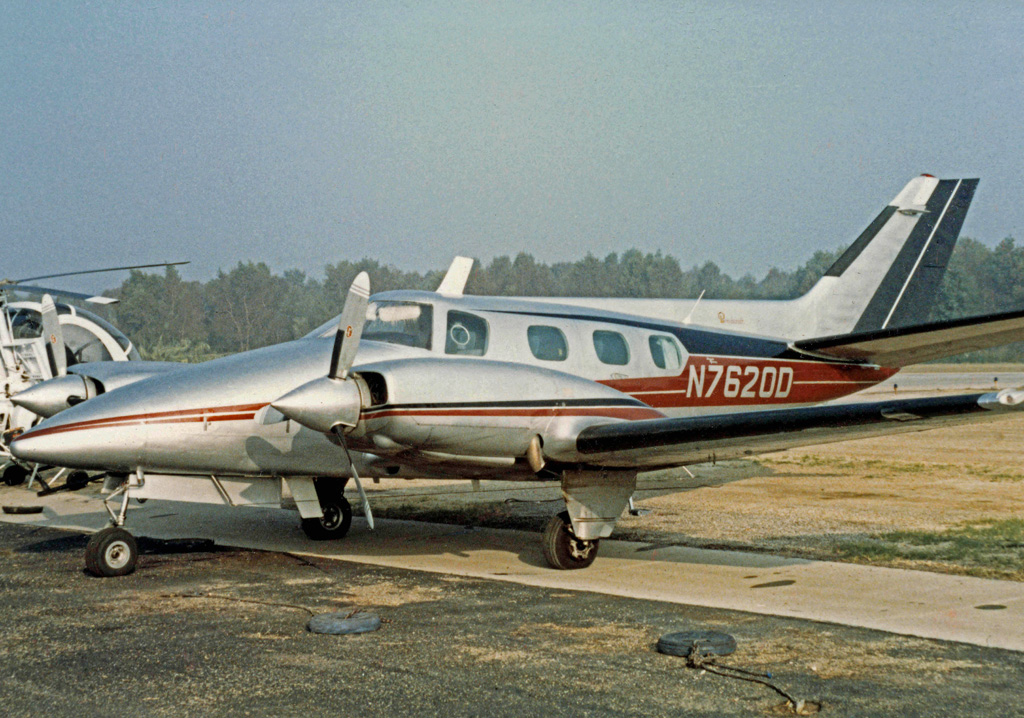
Beech A60 Duke in 1986

The Duke was purchased by corporate and private pilot owners. Most were registered in the United States but examples were exported to many countries including Argentina, Australia, Brazil, Canada, Croatia, Finland, France, Germany, Honduras, Iceland, Serbia, Slovenia, Sweden, Switzerland, South Africa and the United Kingdom. One Duke was flown by the Jamaica Defense Force. Many remain in service in the early twenty-first century.

In reviewing the aircraft in 2008, Rick Durden of AVweb stated,

Built to the quality standards of a King Air, the six-place Duke sported 380 hp [280 kW], Lycoming TIO-541 engines – rare beasts, those – which means when both come due for overhaul, the choice is the overhaul or buying a small house in the Midwest. The assertive lines of the airframe made for a startlingly attractive airplane, but led to high costs of manufacture and, surprising to the casual onlooker, horrendous drag. There are those who claim that the Duke was purposefully designed to be about 30 knots [55 km/h] slower than it could easily have been on the available power simply because otherwise it would have been faster than the flagship of the Beech line, the King Air. The roughly 230-knot [430 km/h] maximum cruise speed is only marginally less than that of a King Air 90 and about the same as a Cessna 421, which carries more on slightly less horsepower. While the Duke shares the delightful handling of the Beech line, should pilots have the joy of single-engine operation, they will be up against the highest rudder-force of any piston twin – 150 pounds-force [670 newtons] at V_{mc} – which happens to be the maximum the FAA allows. Owners report buying a Duke partially because of its looks, but selling it because of the cost of keeping it running. They describe King Air maintenance costs in a piston-twin airframe and recognize that the value of the airplane is entirely dependent on the engines. A gear-up landing means an engine teardown and propeller replacement, along with some sheet metal work. The cost is so high in relation to the value of the airframe that, in many cases, the insurance company will consider the airplane a total loss.

== Production figures ==
- Beechcraft 60 : 125
- Beechcraft A60 : 121
- Beechcraft B60: 350

== Operators ==
=== Military operators ===
Angola
Jamaica
Jamaica Defence Force

== Specifications (B60) ==
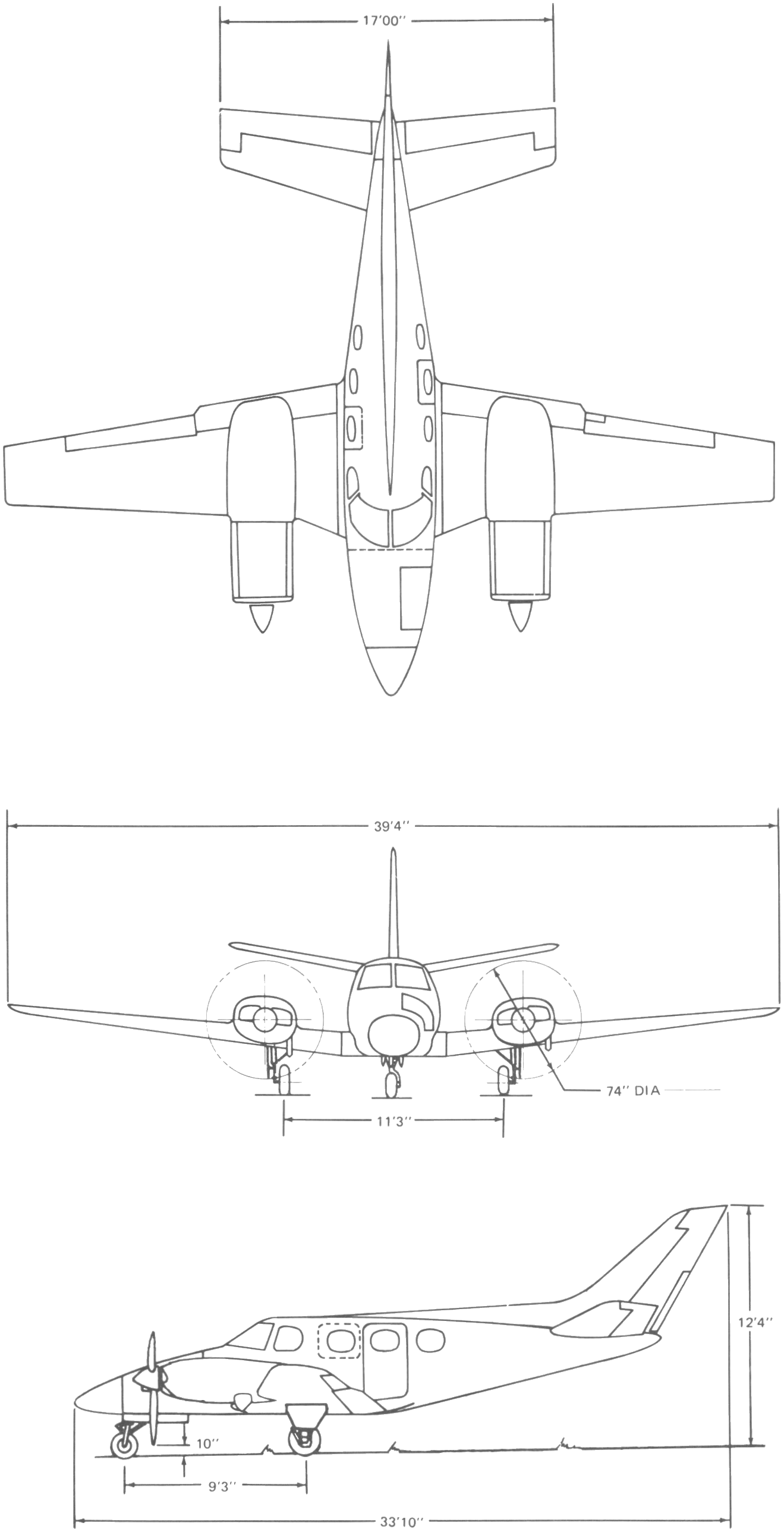
3-view line drawing of the Beechcraft 60 Duke

Data from Janes's All The World's Aircraft 1976–77

General characteristics

- Crew: 1
- Capacity: 5 passengers
- Length: 33 ft 10 in (10.31 m)
- Wingspan: 39 ft 3 1/3 in (11.972 m)
- Height: 12 ft 4 in (3.76 m)
- Wing area: 212.9 sq ft (19.78 m^{2})
- Aspect ratio: 7.243:1
- Airfoil: NACA 23016.5 at root, NACA 2310.5 at tip
- Empty weight: 4,275 lb (1,939 kg)
- Max takeoff weight: 6,775 lb (3,073 kg)
- Fuel capacity: 142 US gal (118 imp gal; 540 L) usable (normal), 232 US gal (193 imp gal; 880 L) with additional optional tanks
- Powerplant: 2 × Lycoming TIO-541-E1C4 turbocharged six-cylinder, horizontally opposed direct drive engines, 380 hp (280 kW) each
- Propellers: 3-bladed Hartzell constant speed

Performance

- Maximum speed: 248 kn (285 mph, 459 km/h) at 23,000 ft (7,000 m)
- Cruise speed: 178 kn (205 mph, 330 km/h) at 20,000 ft (6,100 m), 45% power
- Stall speed: 73 kn (84 mph, 135 km/h) (IAS), wheels and flaps down, power off
- Never exceed speed: 235 kn (270 mph, 435 km/h) IAS
- Range: 1,227 nmi (1,412 mi, 2,272 km) at 20,000 ft (6,100 m), 45% power, 45 min reserves, max optional fuel
- Service ceiling: 30,000 ft (9,100 m)
- Rate of climb: 1,601 ft/min (8.13 m/s)
- Takeoff distance to 50 ft (15m): 2,626 ft (800 m)
- Landing distance from 50 ft (15m): 3,065 ft (934 m)

== See also ==
Related development

- Beechcraft Baron
- Beechcraft Queen Air
- Beechcraft T-34 Mentor
- Beechcraft Twin Bonanza

== Bibliography ==
- Donald, David (editor). The Encyclopedia of World Aircraft. Leicesrer, UK:Blitz Editions, 1997. ISBN 1-85605-375-X.
- Pelletier, A. J. Beech Aircraft and their Predecessors. Annapolis, Maryland, USA: Naval Institute Press, 1995. ISBN 1-55750-062-2.
- Prins, François (Winter 1993). "Brisbane's Heritage". Air Enthusiast. No. 52. pp. 26–27. ISSN 0143-5450.
- Simpson, Rod. Airlife's World Aircraft. Airlife Publishing Ltd, Shrewsbury, England, 2001. ISBN 1-84037-115-3.
- Simpson, Rod. The General Aviation Handbook. Midland Publishing, Hinckley, England, 2005. ISBN 978-1-85780-222-1.
- Taylor, John W. R. Jane's All The World's Aircraft 1976–77. London:Jane's Yearbooks, 1976. ISBN 0-354-00538-3.
- Wheeler, Barry C. "World's Air Forces 1979". Flight International, August 4, 1979. Vol. 116, No. 3672. pp. 333–386.
