= Beechcraft Baron =

Light aircraft manufactured 1961–present

Baron
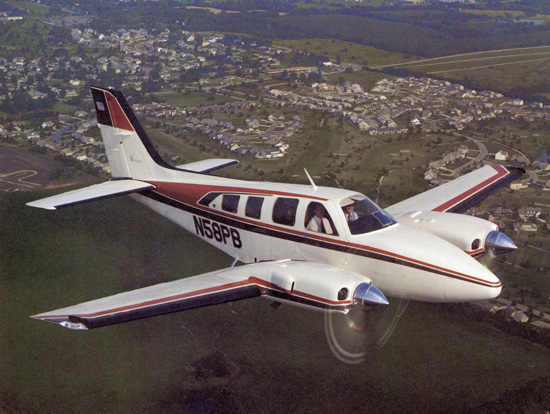
- Beechcraft Baron 58P

General information
- Type: Civil utility aircraft
- National origin: United States
- Manufacturer: Beechcraft
- Status: In production
- Primary user: United States Army (historical)
- Number built: 7,011 (at end of 2025)

History
- Manufactured: 1961–present
- First flight: February 29, 1960
- Developed from: Beechcraft Travel Air

The Beechcraft Baron is a light twin-engined piston aircraft designed and produced by Beechcraft. The aircraft was introduced in 1961. It is a low-wing monoplane developed from the Beechcraft Travel Air.

The Baron was a success and remained in production for decades. In November 2025, Textron Aviation (the owner of Beechcraft) announced that production of the Baron and the related Beechcraft Bonanza will end once current orders are fulfilled. Textron plans to provide parts and support for the Baron indefinitely.

== Design and development ==
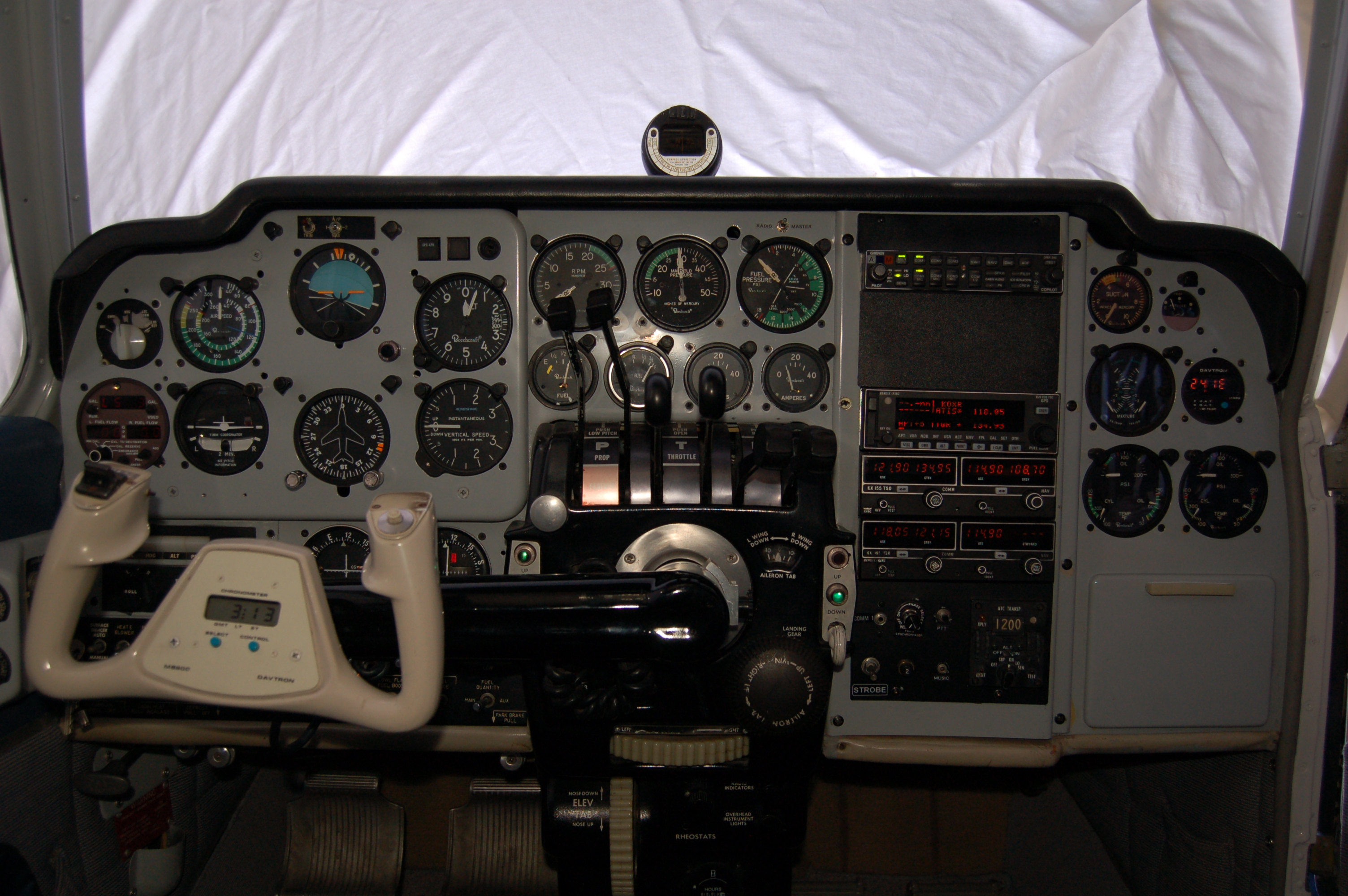
Cockpit of a 1964 Baron 55 with a mixture of original equipment and modern avionics

The direct predecessor of the Baron was the Beechcraft 95 Travel Air, which incorporated the fuselage of the Bonanza and the tail control surfaces of the T-34 Mentor military trainer. To create the new airplane, the Travel Air's tail was replaced with that of the Beechcraft Debonair, the engine nacelles were streamlined, six-cylinder engines were added, and the aircraft's name was changed. In 1960, the Piper Aztec was introduced, using two 250 hp (190 kW) Lycoming O-540 engines; Cessna too had improved its 310 with two Continental IO-470 D, producing 260 hp (190 kW). Meanwhile, Beechcraft's Bonanza had been improved with a Continental IO-470-N. But the answer to competition was to make a true twin-engined variant of the Bonanza. The first model, the 55, was powered by two six-cylinder IO-470-L engines producing 260 hp (190 kW) at 2,625rpm each; it was introduced in 1961. The first Baron included the fully-swept vertical stabilizer of the Debonair while still retaining the four to four+five place seating of the Travel Air.

== Variants ==
Barons come in three basic types: the Baron 55 (short body), Baron 56 (short body) and Baron 58 (long body), with several sub-variants each.

=== Baron 55 ===
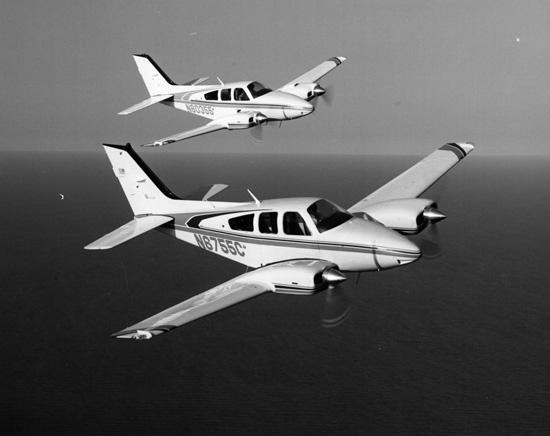
Two Baron 55s flying in formation with a 1980-built B55 (short nose) nearest. E55 (lengthened nose) in background.

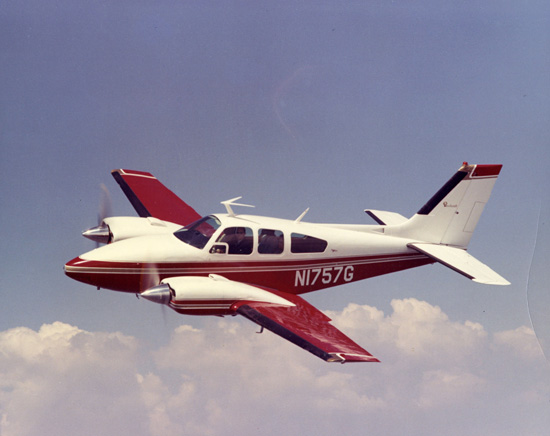
A 1962 Baron C55 in the factory paint scheme (Note: Built in 1962 as part of the A55 production it became the prototype C55)

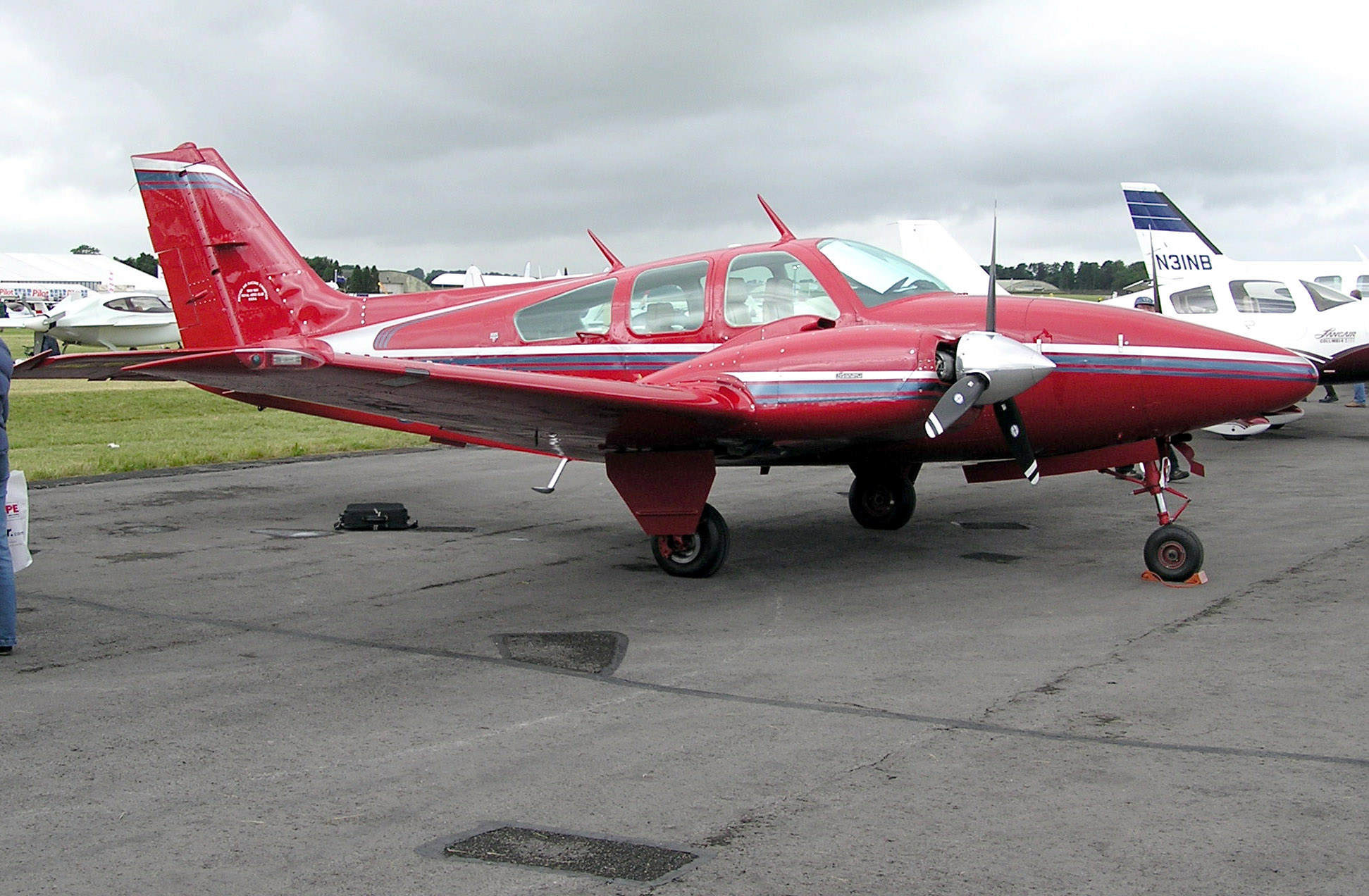
Beechcraft Model E55 Baron

The early Baron 55, A55 and B55 were fitted with 260 hp (190 kW) Continental IO-470 engines and had gross weights of 4,880 to 5,100 lb (2,210 to 2,310 kg)). These had a typical cruise speed of 190 knots (350 km/h) at 7000 ft (2100 m), and came with 116 or 136 US gal (440 or 510 L) fuel tanks. Although its performance was eclipsed by the later variants, the B55 continued to be offered as the basic economy model until the end of the Baron 55 model run, and it would ultimately capture about half of total 55-series sales.

The C55, D55 and E55 models used 285 hp (213 kW) Continental IO-520 engines, increasing cruise speed to 200 kn (230 mph; 370 km/h). Gross weight increased to 5,300 lb (2,400 kg) and the forward fuselage was lengthened by 12 in (30 cm) to increase baggage space in the nose. 136 US gal (510 L), 142 US gal (540 L), or 166 US gal (630 L) fuel tanks were offered.

The Baron 55 was sold with four seats in two rows as standard equipment; a third-row fifth seat was optional initially, and a sixth seat became optional on the A55. However, the lack of a rear passenger door or a second-row pass-through hampers access to the third-row seats, and adults often find the rear fuselage taper confining. Additionally, the aircraft tend to exceed the aft center of gravity (CG) limit with all six seats occupied and no baggage in the nose compartment to act as counterbalance. Owners often remove the third-row seats and use the rear fuselage as additional baggage space.

Model 55 Barons were produced from 1961 to 1983, with 3,651 manufactured. All use the ICAO aircraft type designator BE55.

Model 95-55 Baron
Baron prototype. Registration N9695R (c/n TC-1)
95-55
Introduced 1961. Four to five seat, twin engined transport, powered by two 260 hp (190 kW) Continental IO-470-l six cylinder piston engines. 190 units built. Priced at $58,250.
95-A55
Built 1962 through 1963. Four to five seats. Improvements were a new instrument panel, interior, and exterior paint scheme. Priced at $58,950. 309 built.
95-B55
Introduced in 1964, run through 1982. Four to six-seats. New exterior scheme and interior design. A 120 lb (54 kg) increase in gross weight to 5,100 lb (2,313 kg). Priced at $59,950 (1964), $177,500 (1982). 1951 built. (Note: Textron and Simpson disagree on the number of B55 aircraft built; Textron states 1951 while Simpson states 1958. Textron has been treated as authoritative because all individual serial numbers are accounted for.)
95-C55
Built 1966 through 1967. Four to six seats. Powered by two, 285 hp (213 kW) Continental IO-520-C piston engines. Increased performance over the B55. Nose lengthened to accommodate more baggage or equipment, and to improve weight and balance. Crack-prone engine air intake box design changed. Alternators changed from belt driven to gear driven. Priced at $68,350 in 1966. 451 aircraft built.
D55
Built 1968 through 1969. Four to six seats. Introduced new paint scheme and 'speed-slope' windshield. Changed to three blade props and a different flap configuration. Priced at $73,950 in 1968. 316 aircraft built.
E55
Introduced in 1970, run through 1982. Four to six seats. Incorporated new paint scheme and interior design. Improved avionics and panel. Wing-tip lights and rotating beacon made flush; new entrance step. Also added were 172 US gal (650 L) (166 US gal (630 L) usable) interconnected tanks with one fill cap per wing became an option in 1976. 433 built. Priced at $83,950 in 1970, $219,500 in 1982. 434 aircraft built.
C-55
Brazilian Air Force designation of the Model 95-C55.

=== Baron 56TC ===
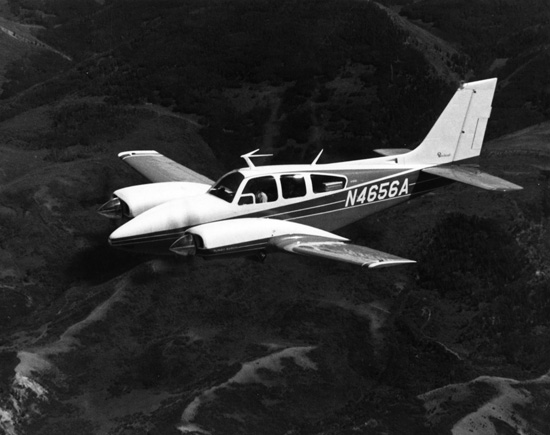
An early Baron 56TC seen in-flight.

In 1967, Beechcraft had begun development of a faster, pressurized twin, the Model 60 Duke; the Duke was to go head-to-head with Cessna's 320 Skyknight. The Duke was to use two turbocharged 380 hp (280 kW) Lycoming TIO-541-E1A4 engines, therefore, Beech wanted experience working with, and flying the new engine. The engine was fitted to a modified Baron C55, becoming the 56TC (that prototype, TG-1, was later retired after certification). The results of the 56TC were as planned, it proved a good testbed and experience building model for the Duke's development. However, it was a noticeably loud airplane, especially so for a Beechcraft. Along with its increased noise, the 56TC had an increase in structural strength and thus empty weight to compensate for the higher power. When introduced in 1967, it was the fastest Beech aircraft, rivaling even the early King Airs sold at the time. 94 Baron 56TC aircraft were built between 1967 and 1971 (Note: Textron and Simpson disagree on the breakdown of 56TC and A56TC aircraft, but agree on the series total. Textron states 82 56TC and 11 A56TC but does not include prototype TG-1 in the totals. Simpson states 82 56TC including TG-1, and 12 A56TC. Textron has been treated as authoritative because all individual serial numbers are accounted for, although the model designation of TG-1 is not made clear.) and all use the ICAO type designator BE56.

56TC
First flown on 25 May 1966. Introduced in 1967, built until the 1969 model year. Four to six seats. Power came from two 380 hp (280 kW) Lycoming TIO-541-E1B4 turbocharged piston engines. Priced at $89,950 in 1967. 82 aircraft sold. Prototype TG-1 retained by the factory.

A56TC
Introduced 1970, built until 1971. Only model change throughout the 56 production. Featured new exterior paint scheme and interior design, new instrument panel, smooth rotating beacon and navigation lights, nose wheel light. Priced at $101,750 in 1970. 11 sold.

=== Baron 58 ===
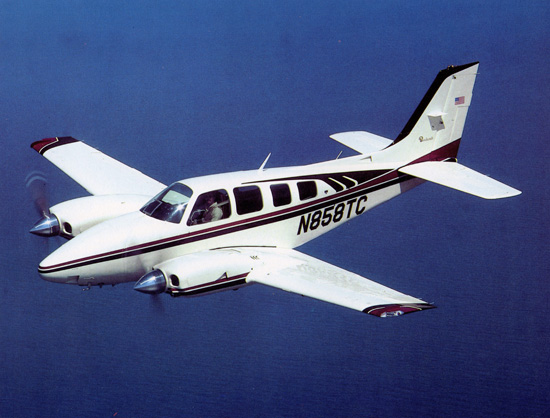
The turbocharged 58TC variant.

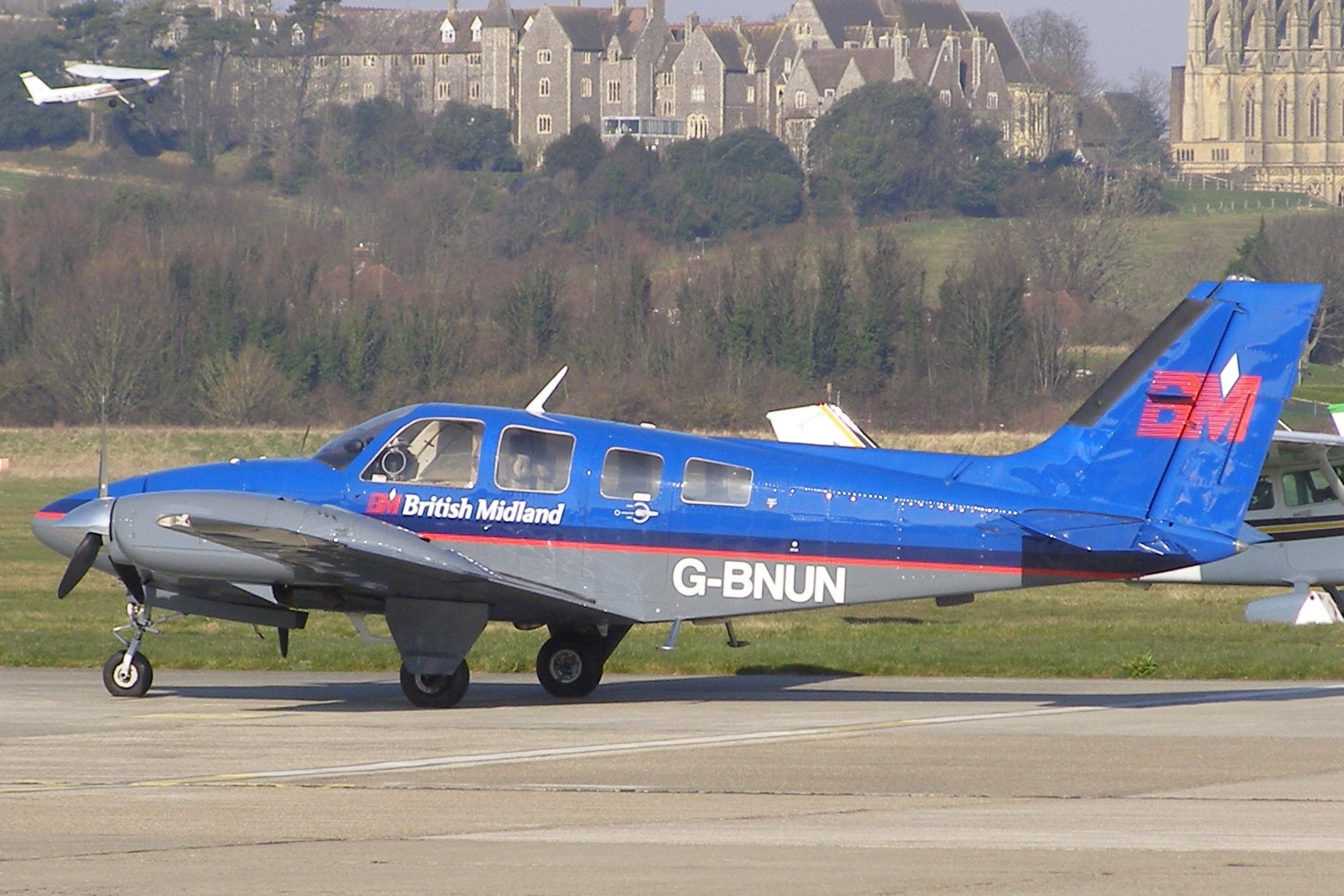
1980 Baron 58PA of BMI

Introduced for the model year 1969, the larger, more powerful Baron 58 was developed from the Baron 55, with an increased gross weight of 5,400 lb (2,400 kg). Depending on the variant, the Baron 58 is fitted with either Continental IO-520 or IO-550 300 hp (220 kW) engines. The Baron 58 can cruise at 200 knots (370 km/h) at 7000 ft (2100 m). The most significant change was a fuselage stretch of 10 inches (25 cm) and the introduction of double rear fuselage doors and reversible club seats in the center row, eliminating the need for passengers to climb over the center seats or through the rear baggage door to access the rear seats. The entire fuselage was repositioned forward on the wing to address the aft CG issue that plagued the short-body models. The longer 58 fuselage has four side windows while the 55 and 56 fuselages have three. The larger fuselage and improved rear-cabin access have made the 58 far more popular with commercial air charter and cargo operators than the smaller 55 and 56.

The ICAO type designator of all Baron 58 models is BE58.

In 1976, the turbocharged Baron 58TC and pressurized Baron 58P were introduced. These variants were powered by turbocharged Continental TSIO-520s of 310–325 hp (231–242 kW), had an increased 6,100–6,200 lb (2,767–2,812 kg) gross weight, and were certified under FAR23 with a new type certificate. The Baron 58P/58TC models were capable of cruising at 200 kn (370 km/h) at 8000 ft (2400 m) and 220 knots (410 km/h) at 20000 ft (6100 m), and were typically equipped with 190 US gal (720 L; 160 imp gal) fuel tanks.

In 1984, the instrument panel was redesigned to eliminate the large central control column and engine controls mounted high on the instrument panel to clear it. In pre-1984 aircraft with the optional dual control yokes, the arm to the right-hand yoke partially blocks the radios and some cockpit switches. The redesign provides a more industry-standard control arrangement and increases instrument panel space, but the aircraft lost the option of having a single yoke, which enhanced comfort for a passenger or relief pilot in the right-hand seat.

Although the turbocharged 58TC/58P variants were discontinued in 1984 and 1985, respectively, the normally aspirated Baron 58 was still in production as of 2021. The current production version is the G58, featuring a glass cockpit, improved passenger cabin and changes to selected airframe details.

58 Baron
Original variant, first flown on 23 June 1969, introduced in 1969 and run through 2004 (production continued as G58). Four to six seats. Powered by two 285 hp (213 kW) Continental IO-520-C or Continental IO-550-C piston engines. 2,124 aircraft built.
58P Baron
Introduced 1976, run through 1985. Pressurized cabin, powered by two Continental TSIO-520-L turbocharged piston engines. Priced at $200,750 in 1976. 495 produced.
58TC Baron
Introduced in 1976, run through 1984. Turbocharged engines, powered by 310 hp (230 kW) Continental TSIO-520-L engines. First flew October 31, 1975. Priced at $170,750 in 1976. 151 aircraft sold.
G58 Baron
Introduced in 2005, currently in production. Version of 58 Baron with Garmin G1000 glass cockpit avionics.
G58 Baron ISR
Introduced in 2013, Beechcraft developed a low cost ISTAR aircraft for Fuerzas Unidas de Rapida Acción (FURA), an agency within the Puerto Rico Police Department. In 2014, the aircraft was upgraded with a FLIR 230-HD electro-optical/infrared (EO/IR) camera system, operator's console that housed the mapping/mission management computer, a recorder, a multi-band communications radio system and data link for special mission operators.

=== T-42A Cochise (95-B55B) ===
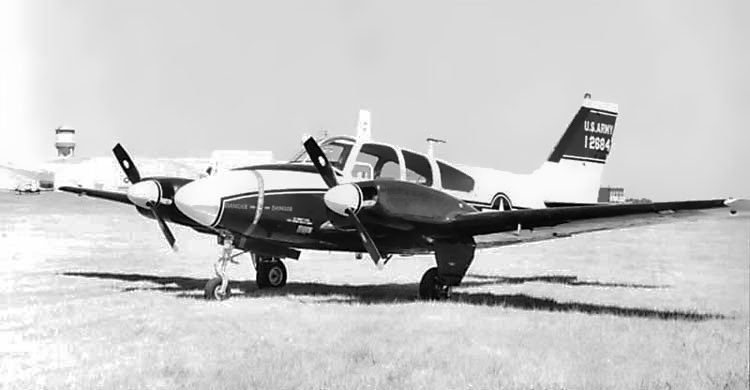
T-42 Cochise

The T-42A Cochise is a military version of the Baron 95-B55 for use by the United States Army as an instrument training aircraft. 65 aircraft were purchased for the Army Aviation School in 1965–1966; a further five were bought commercial off-the-shelf by the U.S. in 1971 from civil B55 production, assigned U.S. military serial numbers, and sold to the Turkish Army.

Three Army T-42s were transferred to the United States Navy. By 1993, the Army's remaining T-42 aircraft had been transferred to the Army Reserve and the National Guard and were no longer in standard use. With the exception of three aircraft destroyed in accidents, three donated to technical schools for instructional use, and one at the United States Army Aviation Museum, all U.S. military T-42s were eventually transferred to civil owners as military surplus. In March 2023, the Army Aviation Museum T-42A, serial number 65-12697, was in storage and not on public display.

=== SFERMA SF-60A Marquis ===
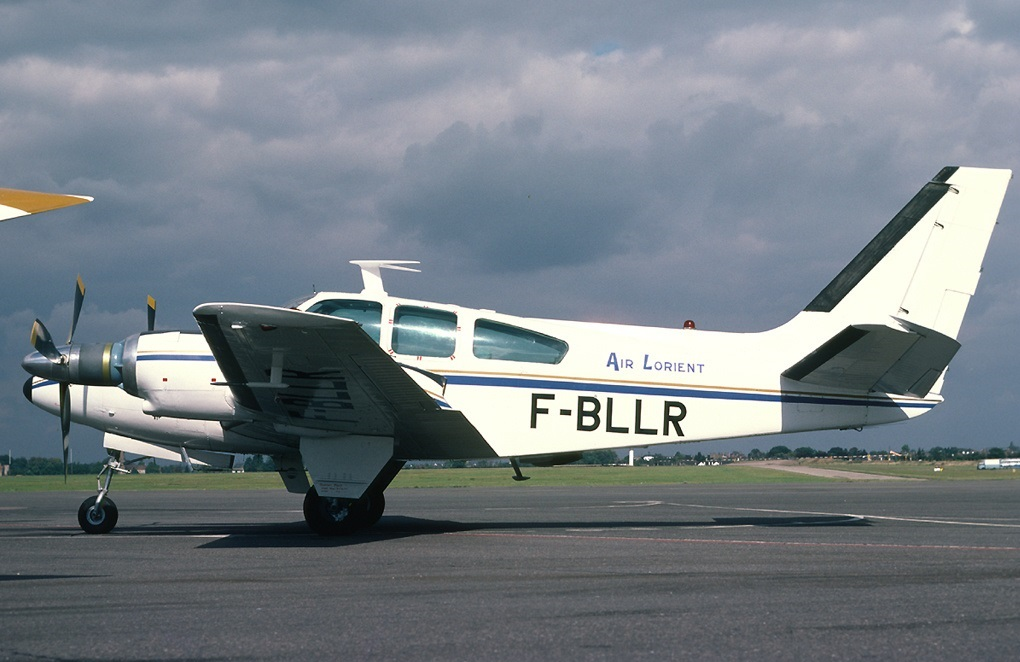
SFERMA 60A Marquis

A twin 530 hp (400 kW) Astazou X turboprop modification of the Baron first flown in 1961 developed from SFERMA's 1960 Astazou IIA turboprop conversion of a Model 95 Travel Air (SFERMA PD-146 Marquis). At least ten converted to follow on from eight converted Travel Airs.

== Operators ==
=== Government operators ===
Argentina

- Presidential Flight – One Baron 55 temporarily transferred during 1989 from the Junta Nacional de Carnes.

=== Military operators ===
Argentina

- Argentine Army – One Baron 55 and one 58. Retired in 1983.

Bolivia

- Bolivian Air Force – One. It crashed 2 May 2020.

Dominican Republic

- Dominican Republic Air Force – 1 in inventory in 2023

Haiti

- Haiti Air Corps

Indonesia

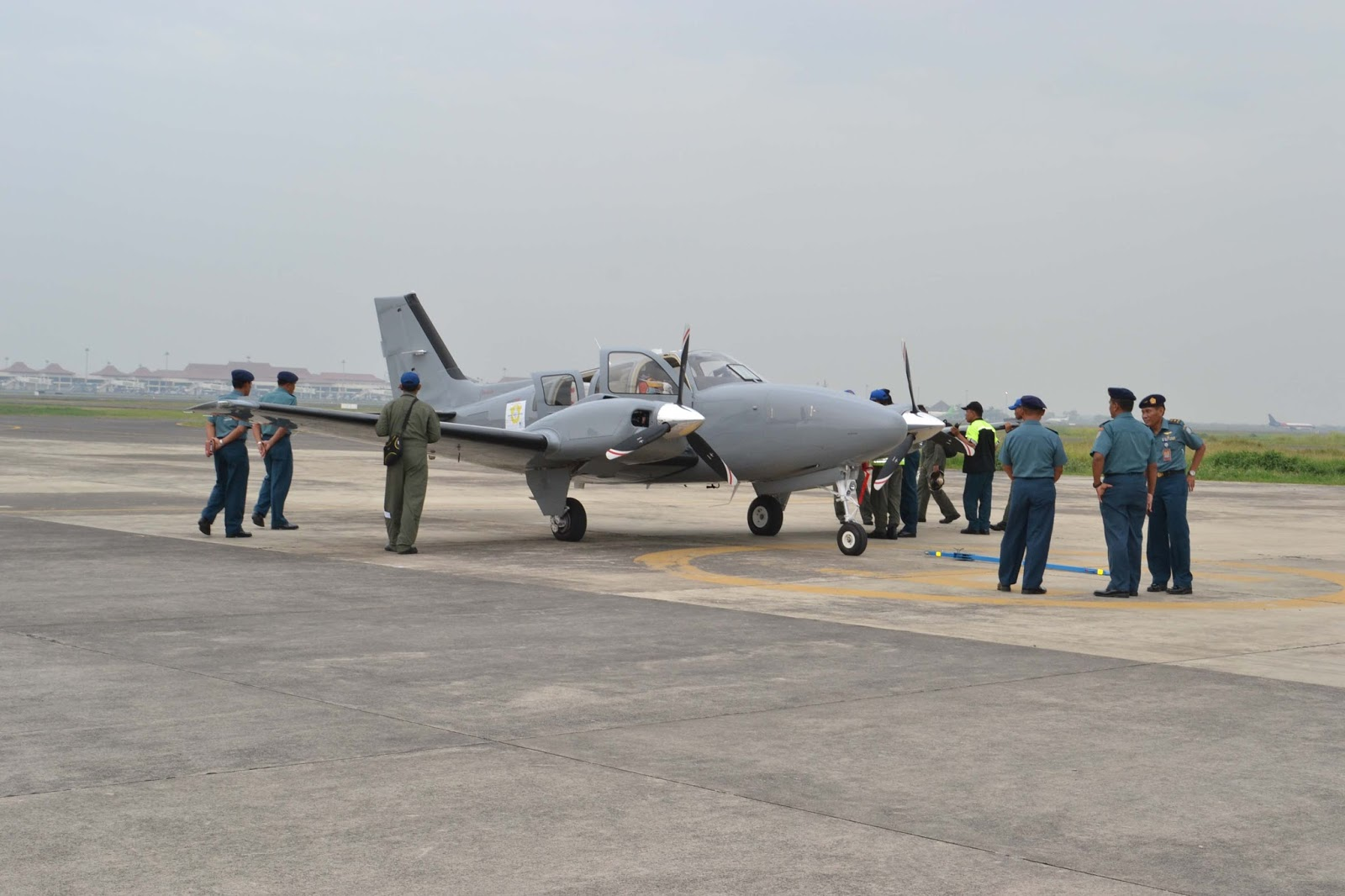
G58 Baron of the Indonesian Naval Aviation

- Indonesian Navy – 2 G58 Baron in 2015

Mexico

- Mexican Air Force
- Mexican Naval Aviation – 2 in inventory in 2023

Panama

- National Aeronaval Service – 1 in inventory in 2023

Paraguay

- Paraguayan Air Force – 2 in inventory in 2023

Peru

- Peruvian Air Force – 1 in inventory in 2023

Rhodesia

- Rhodesian Air Force – One aircraft only.

Spain

- Spanish Air Force

Turkey

- Turkish Air Force
- Turkish Army – 5 in inventory in 2023

United States

- United States Army
- United States Air Force – 1 in inventory in 2023

Uruguay

- Uruguayan Air Force – 2 in inventory in 2023

== Accidents and incidents ==
The Beechcraft Baron has been involved in the following notable accidents and incidents:

- On 9 March 1967, a Baron B55, aircraft registration number N6127V, collided in mid-air near Urbana, Ohio, with TWA Flight 553, a Douglas DC-9-15 on approach to Dayton Municipal Airport. The collision and ensuing crashes destroyed both aircraft, killing all 21 passengers and four crew aboard the DC-9 and the pilot of the Baron, who was the sole aircraft occupant. The Baron pilot was flying under visual flight rules (VFR) and was not in contact with air traffic control (ATC); the two pilots in the DC-9 were warned by ATC of VFR traffic in the area, but the pilots' conversation on the cockpit voice recorder never clearly indicated that they saw the Baron. The National Transportation Safety Board (NTSB) attributed the accident to the failure of the TWA crew to "see and avoid" the Baron under VFR, but recommended that ATC procedures be improved to ensure separation between fast-moving airliners flying under instrument flight rules and slower-moving VFR flights in terminal areas.
- On 20 July 1973, land artist Robert Smithson, a photographer, and the pilot died in the crash of a Baron E55, N814T, while inspecting the site of Smithson's earthwork Amarillo Ramp on the ranch of Stanley Marsh 3 near Amarillo, Texas. The NTSB attributed the accident to the pilot's failure to maintain airspeed, with distraction being a contributing factor.
- On 3 August 1976, Jerry Litton, U.S. Representative from Missouri, his wife and two children, and two others died when their Baron 58, registration number N1553W, crashed shortly after takeoff from Chillicothe Municipal Airport in Chillicothe Missouri, on the same day that Litton had won the Democratic Party primary for the 1976 United States Senate election in Missouri. The NTSB attributed the accident to an engine failure caused by breakage of the crankshaft; the pilot's failure to maintain airspeed and raise the landing gear were contributing factors.
- On 5 January 1977, in the Connellan air disaster, fired Connellan Airways pilot Colin Richard Forman deliberately crashed a stolen Baron 58, registration VH-ENA, into the Connellan Airways complex at Alice Springs Airport, killing himself, his former manager and three other Connellan employees, and injuring four others.
- On 23 November 1982, Southern Baptist religious humorist, television personality and author Grady Nutt and two air charter pilots died in the near-vertical crash of a Baron 95-B55, registration number N18411, shortly after takeoff from Folsom Field in Cullman, Alabama, under nighttime instrument meteorological conditions. The NTSB was unable to conclusively determine the cause of the crash, but bad weather and poor visibility were thought to be contributing factors.
- On 15 June 1987, during the Nicaraguan Civil War, a Contra-operated Baron 56TC (reg. N666PF, msn. TG-60) which had been deregistered from the US two years prior, was hit by anti-aircraft fire over Nicaragua's Nueva Segovia Department, in Sandinista government territory. The Baron had been modified to carry rockets for use in an air-to-ground light strike role, and was downed after an attack that reportedly included dropping leaflets and, possibly, reconnaissance. The aircraft crashed 6 km. inside Honduras, in an area known as Cerro El Tigre and its three occupants, all former elements of the US-backed Somoza dictatorship, were injured and captured after the crash landing and were treated in Honduras. The pilot, Juan Gomez, a former colonel in Somoza's National Guard was also reported to be the head of the Contra air force. While a Western journalist reported that the plane was brought down by anti-aircraft artillery, a Russian source credits the Baron's downing to an "Strela-2" (SA-7) man portable surface-to-air missile fired from Murra by Sandinista army soldier Jose Manuel Rodriguez. The Sandinistas denounced that the Baron took off from the Aguacate airbase in Honduras, the main base of the Nicaraguan Democratic Force (NDF), a Contra group supported by the CIA. A Contra NDF spokesman in Miami confirmed that the aircraft was operated by them, but claimed that "it was neither armed nor carried ammunition."
- On 14 February 2000, Champ Car racing team owner and 11-time Indianapolis 500 driver Tony Bettenhausen Jr., his wife and two others were killed when the Baron 58 piloted by Bettenhausen, registration number N875JC, crashed in Cynthiana, Kentucky. The aircraft had flown into known icing conditions and was properly equipped and certified to do so, but the NTSB found that Bettenhausen had allowed airspeed to decay below the certified 130 kn (240 km/h) minimum in icing conditions, causing the aircraft to rapidly lose altitude.
- On 20 September 2012, a Baron 95-C55, registration N265Q, ditched and sank in the Gulf of Mexico 30 mi (50 km) off the coast of Louisiana while en route from Baytown, Texas, to Florida, after a reported instrument panel fire. Owner and pilot Theodore Robert (T.R.) Wright III and copilot Raymond Fosdick were rescued by the United States Coast Guard; the aircraft was not recovered, and the NTSB attributed the crash to a fire of undetermined origin, noting that the wreckage was not examined. The crash garnered substantial publicity when Wright posted a video to social media showing himself and Fosdick in the water awaiting rescue. Suspicion was cast on the crash when the Bureau of Alcohol, Tobacco, Firearms, and Explosives determined that Fosdick started a 2014 fire at Athens Municipal Airport in Texas, destroying a parked Cessna Citation I owned by a corporation controlled by Wright. Both aircraft had been insured for substantially more than their recent purchase prices, and a federal court deemed the Baron crash and the Athens fire to be part of an insurance fraud scheme organized by Wright. The two men were convicted in 2017 of conspiracy to commit arson and conspiracy to commit wire fraud, and were sentenced to federal prison in 2018.
- On 30 March 2013, Eric Hertz, chief executive officer of New Zealand telecommunications company 2degrees, was killed together with his wife when the Baron G58 he was piloting, N254F, crashed into the sea off Kawhia Harbour, New Zealand. The Civil Aviation Authority of New Zealand (CAA) concluded that for unknown reasons, the aircraft's airspeed decreased to the point that control could not be maintained, causing it to enter a spin from which Hertz did not recover. Based on the left-hand engine control settings and anomalies found in the engine itself, the CAA speculated that Hertz was dealing with an undetermined left engine problem when the autopilot applied full nose-up trim to maintain altitude, causing the airspeed to steadily decay, which Hertz did not notice due to a lack of situational awareness.
- On 26 July 2018, Luis Gneiting, Minister of Agriculture and Livestock of Paraguay, the vice minister and the two pilots were killed when their Baron crashed shortly after takeoff from Juan de Ayolas Airport.
- On 24 January 2021, a Baron 95-B55, registration PT-LYG, belonging to the Palmas Futebol e Regatas, a Brazilian association football team, crashed on takeoff from Associação Tocantinense de Aviação Aerodrome, a private airfield near Porto Nacional, Tocantins, Brazil. The crash killed all six people on board: four members of the football team, the team's owner, and the pilot. The Aeronautical Accidents Investigation and Prevention Center attributed the crash to improper loading; contributing factors were inadequate flight planning and poor judgment by the pilot, particularly his failure to perform a rejected takeoff when the aircraft would not climb.

== Specifications (B55) ==
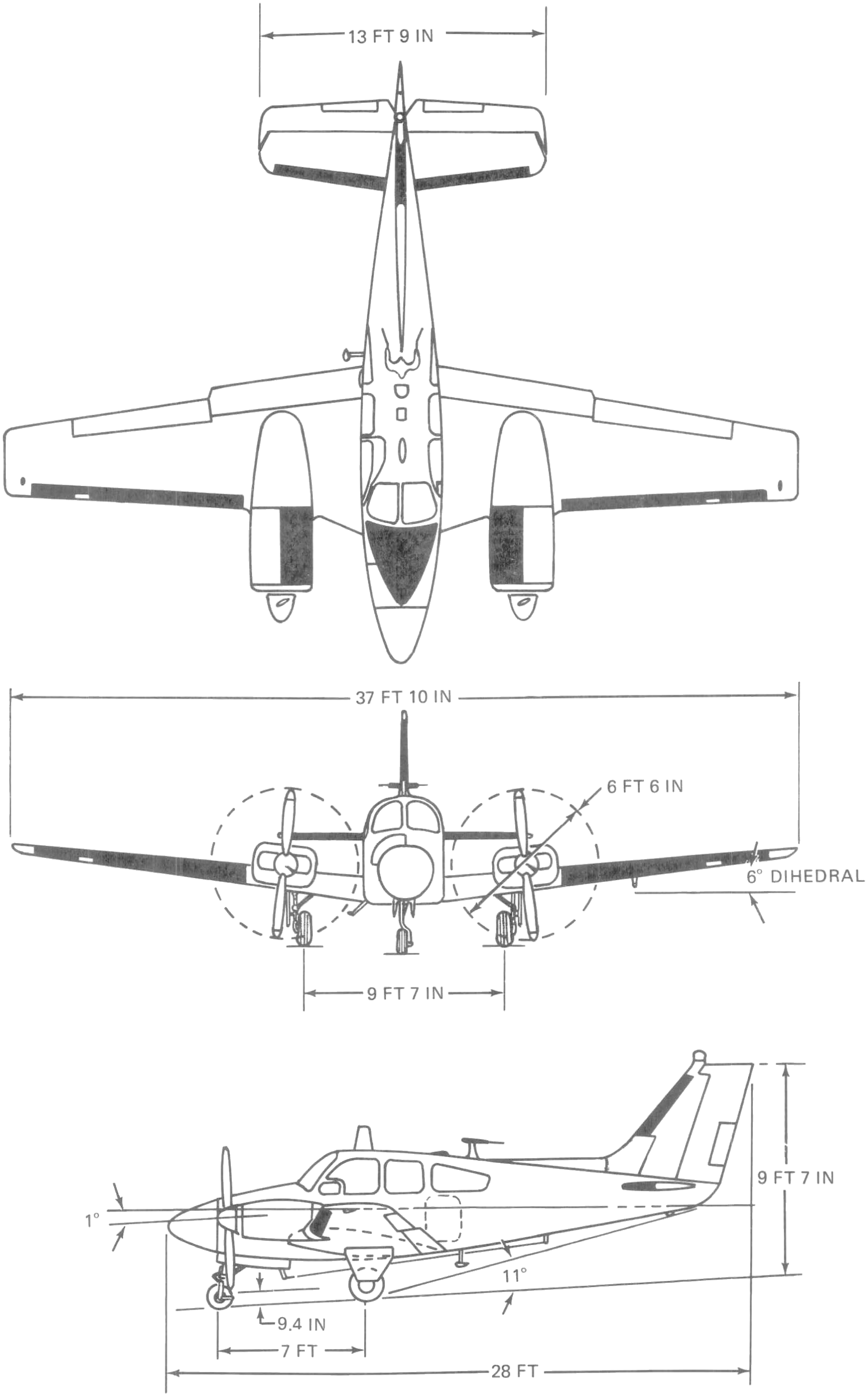
3-view line drawing of the Beechcraft T-42A Cochise

Data from Jane's All The World's Aircraft 1976–77

General characteristics

- Crew: 1
- Capacity: 6 passengers
- Length: 28 ft 0 in (8.53 m)
- Wingspan: 37 ft 10 in (11.53 m)
- Height: 9 ft 7 in (2.92 m)
- Wing area: 199.2 sq ft (18.51 m^{2})
- Airfoil: NACA 23016.5 at root, NACA 23010.5 at tip
- Empty weight: 3,156 lb (1,432 kg)
- Max takeoff weight: 5,100 lb (2,313 kg)
- Fuel capacity: 100 US gal (83 imp gal; 380 L) usable fuel (normal), 136 US gal (113 imp gal; 510 L) with optional tanks
- Powerplant: 2 × Continental IO-470-L air-cooled six-cylinder horizontally opposed engines, 260 hp (190 kW) each

Performance

- Maximum speed: 205 kn (236 mph, 380 km/h) at sea level
- Cruise speed: 180 kn (210 mph, 330 km/h) at 12,000 ft (3,700 m) (55% power)
- Stall speed: 73 kn (84 mph, 135 km/h) IAS, power off, wheels and flaps lowered
- Range: 942 nmi (1,084 mi, 1,745 km) at 10,500 ft (3,200 m), 65% power, 45 min reserves
- Service ceiling: 19,700 ft (6,000 m)
- Rate of climb: 1,670 ft/min (8.5 m/s)
- Takeoff distance to 50 ft (15m): 1,675 ft (511 m)
- Landing distance from 50 ft (15m): 1,840 ft (560 m)

== See also ==
Related development

- Beechcraft Bonanza
- Beechcraft Travel Air
- Bay Super V Bonanza

Aircraft of comparable role, configuration, and era

- Aero Commander 500 family
- Beechcraft Twin Bonanza
- Cessna 310
- Let L-200 Morava
- Partenavia P.68
- Piper PA-34 Seneca
- Piper PA-60 Aerostar

Related lists

- List of military aircraft of the United States
