= Normand Dube Aerocruiser Plus =

Canadian homebuilt aircraft

Aerocruiser Plus

General information
- Type: Amateur-built aircraft
- National origin: Canada
- Manufacturer: Aviation Normand Dube
- Designer: Normand Dube
- Status: In production (2015)
- Number built: one prototype

History
- Introduction date: 1988
- Developed from: Norman Dube Aerocruiser

The Normand Dube Aerocruiser Plus (also called the Aerocruiser 180) is a four-seat Canadian amateur-built aircraft, designed by Normand Dube and produced by Aviation Normand Dube of Sainte-Anne-des-Plaines, Quebec. The aircraft is a development of the two-seat Norman Dube Aerocruiser.

== Design and development ==
The Aerocruiser Plus features a "V" strut-braced high-wing, a four-seat enclosed cabin accessed by doors, fixed conventional landing gear and a single engine in tractor configuration.

The aircraft can be fitted with floats, wheels or skis.

The aircraft is made with a welded 4130 steel tubing fuselage and a riveted 2024 aluminum wing. Its 32 ft (9.8 m) span wing employs a NACA 4412 airfoil, has an area of 161 sq ft (15.0 m^{2}) and mounts flaps. The cabin width is 39 in (99 cm). The engine used on the prototype is a 180 hp (134 kW) Lycoming O-360 four-stroke powerplant.

== Operational history ==
Reviewers Roy Beisswenger and Marino Boric described the design in a 2015 review as "outback-friendly".

By March 2017, one example, the prototype had been registered with Transport Canada.

== Specifications (Aerocruiser Plus) ==
Data from Bayerl, Tacke and the manufacturer

General characteristics

- Crew: one
- Capacity: three passengers
- Length: 25 ft (7.6 m)
- Wingspan: 32 ft (9.8 m)
- Wing area: 160 sq ft (15 m^{2})
- Airfoil: NACA 4412
- Empty weight: 1,088 lb (494 kg)
- Gross weight: 2,200 lb (998 kg)
- Fuel capacity: 200 litres (44 imp gal; 53 US gal)
- Powerplant: 1 × Lycoming O-360 four cylinder, air-cooled, four stroke aircraft engine, 180 hp (130 kW)
- Propellers: 2-bladed metal, fixed pitch

Performance

- Cruise speed: 120 mph (193 km/h, 104 kn)
- Stall speed: 47 mph (75 km/h, 40 kn)
- Rate of climb: 690 ft/min (3.5 m/s)
- Wing loading: 13.6 lb/sq ft (66.4 kg/m^{2})
