= Lycoming TIO-541 =

Six-cylinder aircraft engine

TIO-541
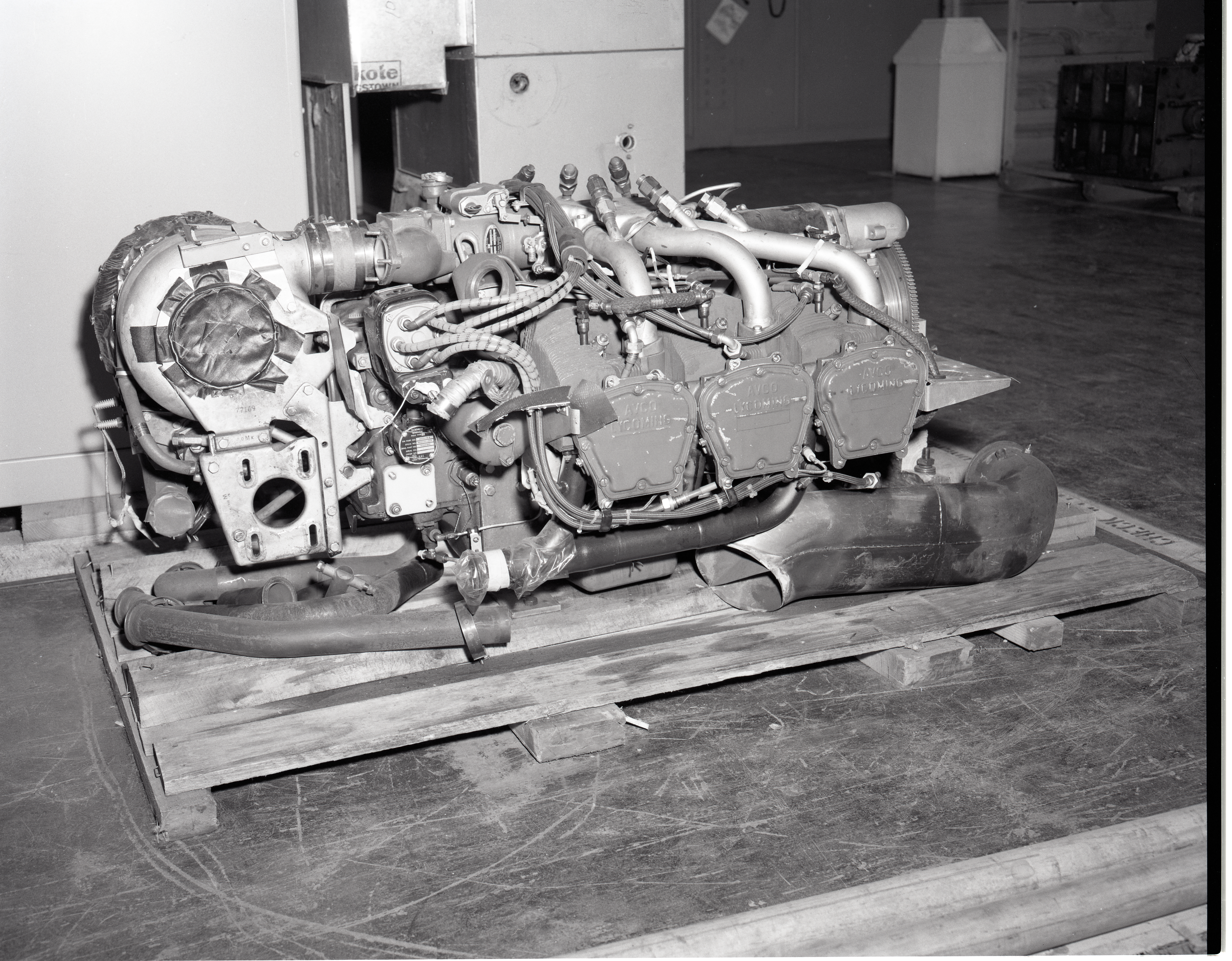
- Lycoming TIO-541
- Type: Piston aero-engine
- National origin: United States
- Manufacturer: Lycoming Engines
- First run: 1963
- Major applications: Beechcraft Duke; Beechcraft Baron
- Manufactured: 1965–present
- Developed from: Lycoming O-540

The Lycoming TIO-541 engine is a turbocharged, fuel-injected, horizontally opposed, six-cylinder aircraft engine featuring three cylinders per side, manufactured by Lycoming Engines.

The TIO-541 family of engines includes the TIGO-541 turbocharged, fuel-injected, geared, horizontally opposed engine.

There is no carburetted, non-turbocharged version of the engine, which would have been designated O-541 and therefore the base model is the TIO-541.

== Design and development ==
The TIO-541 family of engines covers a range from 310 hp (231 kW) to 450 hp (336 kW). The engine has a fuel injection system which meters fuel in proportion to the induction airflow. The engine has a displacement of 541.5 cubic inches (8.87 litres) and produces a maximum of 450 hp (336 kW) in its TIGO-541 version. The cylinders have air-cooled heads.

The first TIO-541-A1A was type certified on 23 February 1965 on the regulatory basis of CAR 13 effective 15 June 1956 as amended to 13-1 through 13–4.

== Variants ==
TIO-541-A1A
Six-cylinder, turbocharged, fuel-injected, 310 hp (231 kW) engine, dry weight 449 lb (204 kg), AiResearch T-1823 turbosupercharger, certified 23 February 1965. Has top induction, down exhaust and side-mounted accessory drives. Provisions for a single-acting, controllable-pitch propeller and internal piston cooling oil jets.
TIO-541-E1A4
Six-cylinder, turbocharged, fuel-injected, 380 hp (283 kW) engine, dry weight 595 lb (270 kg), AiResearch T-1823 turbosupercharger, certified 16 December 1966. Similar to the -A1A but with higher horsepower rating, different cylinder heads, cam shaft, crankshaft and extra counterweights. Incorporates cabin pressurization venturi.
TIO-541-E1B4
Six-cylinder, turbocharged, fuel-injected, 380 hp (283 kW) engine, dry weight 595 lb (270 kg), AiResearch T-1823 turbosupercharger, certified 16 December 1966. Similar to the -E1A4 but without the cabin pressurization venturi.
TIO-541-E1C4
Six-cylinder, turbocharged, fuel-injected, 380 hp (283 kW) engine, dry weight 586 lb (266 kg), AiResearch T-1879 turbosupercharger, certified 21 October 1969. Similar to the -E1A4 but with a different turbosupercharger with cast bracket, cast transition and a separate wastegate.
TIO-541-E1D4
Six-cylinder, turbocharged, fuel-injected, 380 hp (283 kW) engine, dry weight 584 lb (265 kg), AiResearch T-1879 turbosupercharger, certified 21 October 1969. Similar to the -E1B4 but with a different turbosupercharger with cast bracket, cast transition and a separate wastegate.
TIGO-541-B1A
Six-cylinder, turbocharged, fuel-injected, geared, 450 hp (336 kW) engine, dry weight 663 lb (301 kg), AiResearch T-1879 turbosupercharger, certified 12 February 1970. Similar to the -C1A but with a higher power rating and without provisions for cabin bleed air.
TIGO-541-C1A
Six-cylinder, turbocharged, fuel-injected, geared, 400 hp (298 kW) engine, dry weight 703 lb (319 kg), AiResearch T-1879 turbosupercharger, certified 19 November 1968. Has internal piston cooling oil jets, side-mounted accessory drives and a single oil supply from the propeller governor. Provisions for a reverse-pitch propeller control.
TIGO-541-D1A
Six-cylinder, turbocharged, fuel-injected, geared, 450 hp (336 kW) engine, dry weight 706 lb (320 kg), AiResearch T-18A21 turbosupercharger, certified 26 June 1969. Similar to the -C1A but with a higher power rating and a different turbocharger with provisions for cabin bleed air.
TIGO-541-D1B
Six-cylinder, turbocharged, fuel-injected, geared, 450 hp (336 kW) engine, dry weight 710 lb (322 kg), AiResearch T-18A51 turbosupercharger, certified 3 December 1976. Similar to the -D1A but with an integral wastegate turbocharger and a revised exhaust system and with low drag cylinders.
TIGO-541-E1A
Six-cylinder, turbocharged, fuel-injected, geared, 425 hp (317 kW) engine, dry weight 706 lb (320 kg), AiResearch T-18A21 turbosupercharger, certified 26 June 1969. Similar to the -D1A but with a lower power rating, different turbocharger spring rate and a variable absolute pressure controller.
TIGO-541-G1AD
Six-cylinder, turbocharged, fuel-injected, geared, 450 hp (336 kW) engine, dry weight 714 lb (324 kg), AiResearch T-18A21 turbosupercharger, certified 1 May 1975. Similar to the -D1A but it includes an intercooler, a dual magneto and a fuel injector with fuel head enrichment.

== Applications ==
TIO-541

- Beechcraft Baron
- Beechcraft Duke
- Mooney Mustang
- Moynet 360-6 Jupiter

TIGO-541

- Piper PA-31P-425 Navajo
- Norman Dube Aerocruiser 450 Turbo

== Specifications (TIO-541-A1A) ==
Data from TYPE CERTIFICATE DATA SHEET NO. E10EA

=== General characteristics ===
- Type: Six-cylinder, air-cooled, horizontally opposed, direct-drive, fuel-injected, turbosupercharged aircraft engine
- Bore: 5.125 in (130 mm)
- Stroke: 4.375 (111 mm)
- Displacement: 541.5 in³ (8.87 litres)
- Dry weight: 449 lb (249 kg) dry

=== Components ===
- Turbocharger: AiResearch turbosupercharger model T-1823
- Fuel system: Bendix RSA 10AD1
- Fuel type: 100LL avgas
- Cooling system: air-cooled

=== Performance ===
- Power output: 310 hp (233 kW) at 2575 rpm
- Specific power: 0.57 hp/in³ (26.7 kW/L)
- Compression ratio: 7.30:1
- Power-to-weight ratio: 0.69 hp/lb (0.94 kW/kg)

== See also ==
- List of aircraft engines
