= Griffon Lionheart =

Lionheart
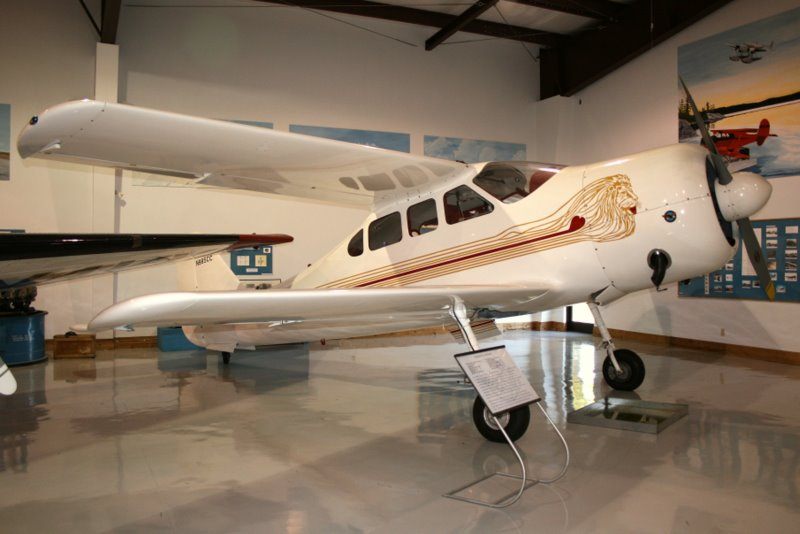
- A Lionheart in the Beechcraft Heritage Museum in Tennessee

General information
- Type: Six-seat homebuilt kit biplane
- National origin: United States
- Manufacturer: Griffon Aerospace

History
- First flight: 27 July 1997

The Griffon Lionheart is an American single-engined, six-seat biplane designed and produced in kit form for home building by Griffon Aerospace of Harvest, Alabama.

== Design and development ==
The Lionheart is based on the Beechcraft Staggerwing biplane of the 1930s; but unlike the steel tube, wood and fabric construction of the Staggerwing it has a composite structure. The Staggerwing has strut-braced wings but the Lionheart has cantilever wings with a total area about 20% less than the wings of the Staggerwing. It is powered by a 450 hp (336 kW) Pratt & Whitney R-985 Wasp Junior radial engine with a three-bladed propeller. It has a retractable conventional landing gear with a tailwheel. The enclosed cabin is slightly longer than the Staggerwing's cabin to allow room for the pilot and five passengers, and it has a split airstair access door on the port side.

The Lionheart first flew on 27 July 1997 and was first displayed in public at EAA AirVenture Oshkosh a few days later. Five kits were sold by April 1998, and two of the kits were completed by 2001, with another almost complete. As of August 2011, three Lionhearts are registered in the United States, with another example on display in an aviation museum at Tullahoma Regional Airport in Tullahoma, Tennessee. Kits are no longer being produced.

== Specifications ==
Data from Jane's All the World's Aircraft 1999-2000

General characteristics

- Crew: 1
- Capacity: 6 (including pilot)
- Length: 26 ft 9.5 in (8.17 m)
- Wingspan: 31 ft 0 in (9.45 m)
- Height: 8 ft 0 in (2.44 m)
- Wing area: 118 sq ft (10.96 m^{2})
- Empty weight: 3,140 lb (1,424 kg)
- Gross weight: 5,200 lb (2,358 kg)
- Powerplant: 1 × Pratt & Whitney R-985 Wasp Junior radial piston engine , 450 hp (336 kW)

Performance

- Maximum speed: 230 mph (370 km/h, 200 kn)
- Cruise speed: 210 mph (338 km/h, 180 kn)
- Stall speed: 56 mph (91 km/h, 49 kn)
- Range: 1,956 mi (3,148 km, 1,700 nmi)
- Service ceiling: 20,000 ft (6,095 m)
- Rate of climb: 2,500 ft/min (13 m/s)
