= Tullahoma (disambiguation) =

Tullahoma, Tennessee is a city in the United States.

Tullahoma may also refer to:

- Tullahoma (album), a 2020 album by Dustin Lynch
- Tullahoma campaign, an American Civil War Union Army military operation
- Tullahoma High School, Tullahoma, Coffee County, Tennessee, U.S.
- Tullahoma Regional Airport, Coffee County, Tennessee, U.S.
