= Griffon Aerospace Valiant =

Tactical UAV made by Griffon Aerospace

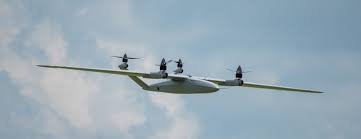
- Griffon Aerospace Valiant During Flight

General information
- Type: Tactical UAV
- Manufacturer: Griffon Aerospace
- Status: Prototype / Testing completed

The Griffon Aerospace Valiant (military designation: YRQ-30A) is an autonomous, hybrid-electric VTOL (vertical takeoff and landing) tactical unmanned aerial vehicle (UAV) developed by Griffon Aerospace for reconnaissance, surveillance, and expeditionary multi-domain military operations.

Developed primarily to compete in the U.S. Army's Future Tactical Uncrewed Aircraft System (FTUAS) program to replace the AAI RQ-7 Shadow, the aircraft features an innovative quad-tiltrotor layout optimized for runway-independent operations.

== Development ==
The Valiant was publicly revealed by Griffon Aerospace in 2022. The aircraft was designed to eliminate the reliance of tactical UAVs on vulnerable runways or complex launching infrastructure, allowing deployment directly alongside frontline units.

In March 2023, the Valiant was selected as one of five entries for Phase 1 of the U.S. Army's FTUAS Increment 2 rapid prototyping effort. In October 2023, the U.S. Army downselected the competition to two finalists, advancing the Griffon Valiant alongside the Textron Aerosonde Mk 4.8 HQ into Phase 2 for rigorous environmental, flight, and software compatibility evaluations.

During testing, the aircraft served as a primary platform for validating the military's Modular Open Systems Approach (MOSA), successfully flying with third-party software architectures and rugged edge computing hardware like Parry Labs' Edge Compute Micro. In April 2025, the U.S. Army formally accepted delivery of the Valiant systems via the DD-250 process for government-led developmental testing at Redstone Test Center.

The Army formally allocated the prototype military designation YRQ-30A to the platform in April 2025. Although the overall FTUAS program was canceled by the Army in May 2025 prior to a final production contract, the Valiant successfully met its rapid prototyping goals.

== Design ==
The Valiant is a Group 3 tactical UAS platform characterized by a long, high-aspect-ratio wing and a V-tail configuration. It utilizes a unique hybrid-electric tiltrotor propulsion system designed to balance low-logistics vertical takeoff with highly efficient forward cruise flight.

=== Propulsion and Flight Transition ===
The aircraft features four tilting propellers driven by individual electric motors. Two larger propellers are mounted on the main wing, and two smaller ones are integrated into the tips of the V-tail.

- Vertical Flight (Hover): All four rotors tilt vertically to provide thrust. The front wing-mounted rotors generate approximately 70% of the vertical lift, while the rear tail-mounted rotors provide the remaining 30%. Lift during this phase is powered entirely by internal batteries drawing 34 horsepower.
- Transition and Cruise: Upon reaching an airspeed of roughly 45 knots, the aircraft transitions to wing-borne flight. The front two propellers are braked and folded back against the wings to minimize aerodynamic drag. The rear two rotors tilt forward to provide all remaining cruise thrust, requiring only 3 horsepower.
- Power Source: While hovering relies on stored battery power, long-endurance forward flight is sustained by an internal heavy-fuel combustion engine functioning as an electrical generator to power the rear motors and continuously recharge the batteries.

=== Avionics and Payloads ===
Built around a Modular Open Systems Approach (MOSA), the Valiant features highly adaptive, swappable payload bays. This architecture allows operators to rapidly interchange sensor packages, communications relays, or electronic warfare systems from various third-party defense manufacturers without altering the core software environment.

== Specifications ==
Data from Electric VTOL News & Designation-Systems

General characteristics

- Crew: 0 (autonomous)
- Capacity: Swappable mission payloads

Performance

- Endurance: High endurance (Group 3 tactical class)
- Transition speed: 45 knots (83 km/h)

== See also ==
- AAI RQ-7 Shadow
- Textron Aerosonde
- V-Bat (UAV)
