= Jakobe Thomas =

American football player (born 2003)

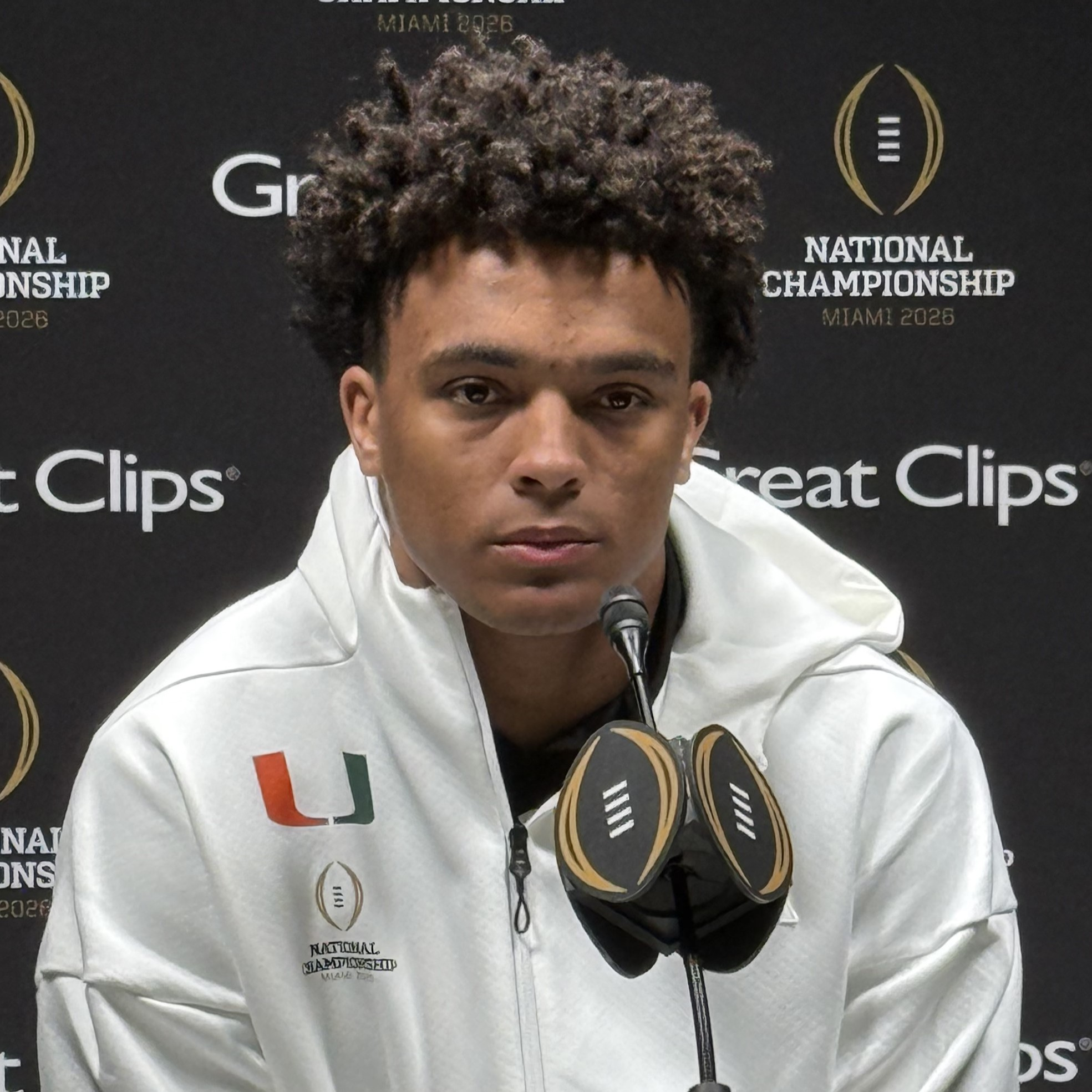
- Thomas in 2026

No. 6 – Minnesota Vikings
- Position: Safety
- Roster status: Active

Personal information
- Born: June 30, 2003 (age 23); Starkville, Mississippi, U.S.
- Listed height: 6 ft 1 in (1.85 m)
- Listed weight: 211 lb (96 kg)

Career information
- High school: Tullahoma (Tullahoma, Tennessee)
- College: Middle Tennessee (2021–2023); Tennessee (2024); Miami (FL) (2025)
- NFL draft: 2026: 3rd round, 98th overall pick

Career history
- Minnesota Vikings (2026–present)

Awards and highlights
- Second-team All-ACC (2025)

Career NFL statistics as of Week 10, 2026
- Total tackles: 2
- Forced fumbles: 1
- Stats at Pro Football Reference

Jakobe Mekhi Thomas (born June 30, 2003) is an American professional football safety for the Minnesota Vikings of the National Football League (NFL). He played college football for the Middle Tennessee Blue Raiders, the Tennessee Volunteers and the Miami Hurricanes. Thomas was selected by the Vikings in the third round of the 2026 NFL draft.

== Early life ==
Thomas was born and grew up in Starkville, Mississippi before moving to Tullahoma, Tennessee, where he would attend Tullahoma High School. Coming out of high school, Thomas committed to play college football for the Middle Tennessee Blue Raiders.

== College career ==
=== Middle Tennessee ===
During his first collegiate season in 2021, Thomas used the season to redshirt.

In the 2022 season, Thomas played in all 12 games making three starts, where he had 37 tackles with one going for a loss, three pass deflections, four interceptions, and a forced fumble.

During the 2023 season, Thomas became a full-time starter, where he recorded 71 tackles with three being for a loss, five pass deflections, and a forced fumble, where after the conclusion of the season, he decided to enter his name into the NCAA transfer portal.

=== Tennessee ===
Thomas transferred to play for the Tennessee Volunteers, after initially committing to play for the Oregon State Beavers.

In his first season in 2024, Thomas played in all 13 games and recorded 22 tackles, a sack, and two pass deflections. After the conclusion of the 2024 season, Thomas decided to once again enter his name into the NCAA transfer portal.

=== Miami (FL) ===
Thomas transferred to play for the Miami Hurricanes. He entered the 2025 season as one of the Hurricanes starting safeties.

During Week 4 of the 2025 season, Thomas had five tackles, with one and a half being for a loss, and a sack in a victory over rival Florida. Two weeks later, he recorded five tackles, a sack, two pass deflections, an interception, and a forced fumble in a 28–22 victory over rival Florida State. Thomas was named the ACC defensive back of the week and the Bronco Nagurski Defensive Player of the week. In Week 11, Thomas had an interception in a victory over Syracuse.

== Professional career ==
Pre-draft measurables
Height	Weight	Arm length	Hand span	Wingspan	40-yard dash	10-yard split	20-yard split	20-yard shuttle	Vertical jump	Broad jump
6 ft 1 1/4 in (1.86 m)	211 lb (96 kg)	31 7/8 in (0.81 m)	10 5/8 in (0.27 m)	6 ft 4 in (1.93 m)	4.58 s	1.63 s	2.64 s	4.32 s	33.0 in (0.84 m)	9 ft 11 in (3.02 m)
All values from NFL Combine/Pro Day

Thomas was selected by the Minnesota Vikings in the third round (98th overall) of the 2026 NFL draft. Thomas made his NFL debut during Week 10 against the Green Bay Packers. In the fourth quarter, he forced a fumble on Packers kickoff returner J. Michael Sturdivant that was recovered by fellow Vikings linebacker Jake Golday. This was one of four turnovers the Vikings forced as they won on the road 30–10.
