= Steve Matthews (American football) =

American football player (born 1970)

No. 16, 11
- Position: Quarterback

Personal information
- Born: October 13, 1970 (age 56); Tullahoma, Tennessee, U.S.
- Listed height: 6 ft 3 in (1.91 m)
- Listed weight: 228 lb (103 kg)

Career information
- High school: Tullahoma
- College: Memphis
- NFL draft: 1994: 7th round, 199th overall pick

Career history
- Kansas City Chiefs (1994–1996); Scottish Claymores (1996); Jacksonville Jaguars (1997); Tennessee Oilers (1998)

Career NFL statistics
- Passing attempts: 43
- Passing completions: 28
- Completion percentage: 65.1%
- TD–INT: 0–0
- Passing yards: 299
- Passer rating: 85.3
- Stats at Pro Football Reference

Stephen Keith Matthews (born October 13, 1970) is an American former professional football player who was a quarterback for five seasons in the National Football League (NFL). He played college football for the Memphis Tigers. Matthews played in the NFL for the Kansas City Chiefs, Jacksonville Jaguars, and Tennessee Oilers. He is currently the head football coach at Concord Christian School in Farragut, Tennessee.

== Professional career ==
Matthews was selected in the seventh round (199th overall) in the 1994 NFL draft by the Kansas City Chiefs. After three seasons with no playing time, he left and joined the Jacksonville Jaguars. With the Jaguars, Matthews played in two games and started one. In his first start on September 7, 1997, Matthews led Jacksonville to a win over the New York Giants by completing 23 of 35 passes with no interceptions. He would then play for the Tennessee Titans during the 1998 season. He played in just one game, completing 2 of 3 passes for 24 yards. He would be released at the end of the '98 Season.
