= Beechcraft Lightning =

Experimental Turboprop Aircraft

Lightning
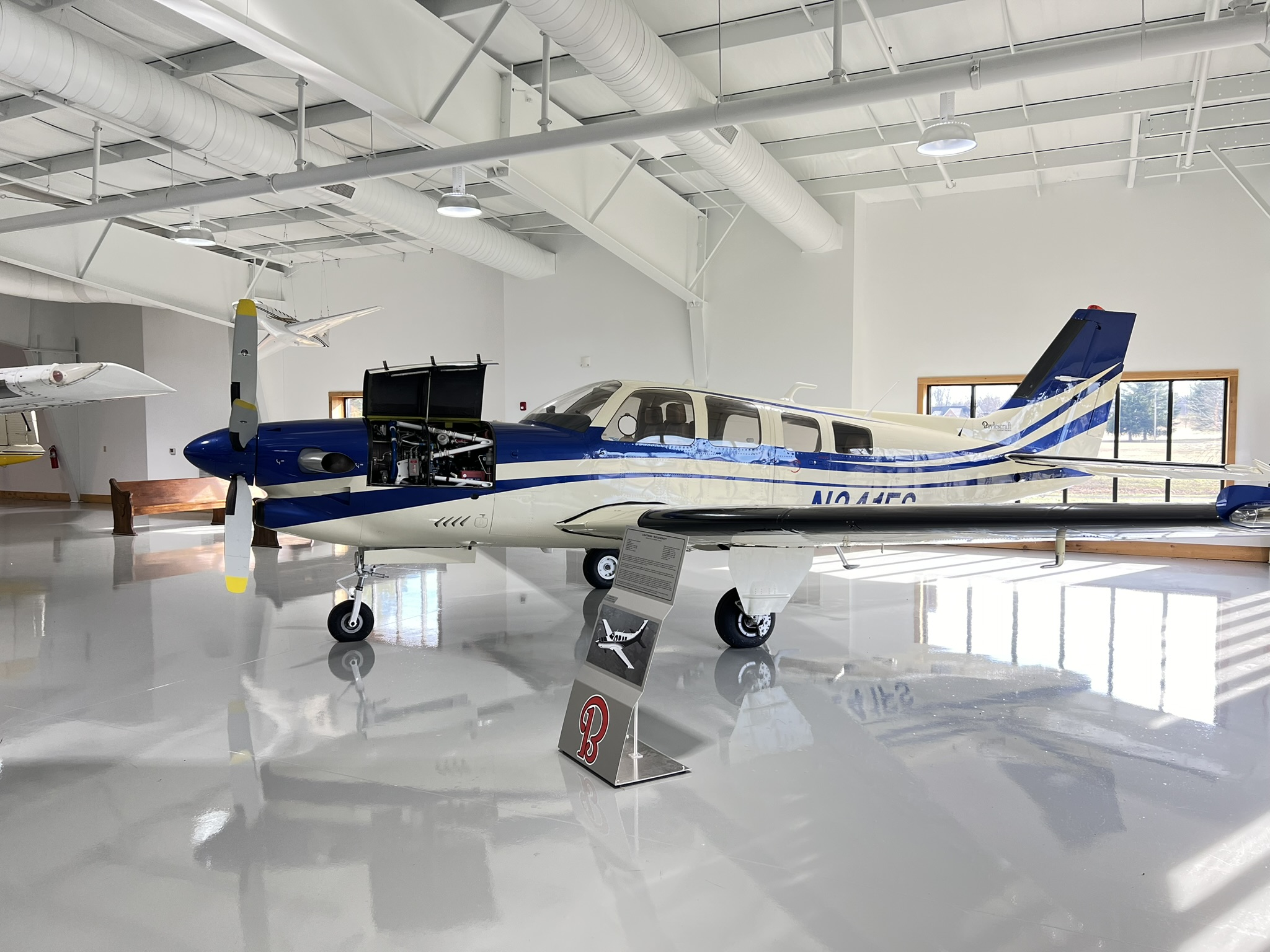
- Beechcraft Lightning replica at the Beechcraft Heritage Museum

General information
- Type: Civil utility aircraft
- Manufacturer: Beechcraft
- Number built: 1

History
- Introduction date: 1982
- First flight: June 14, 1982
- Retired: 1984
- Developed from: Beechcraft Baron

The Beechcraft Model 38P Lightning was an experimental turboprop aircraft built and tested by Beechcraft in the 1980s.

== History ==
The Model 38P (Pressurized) (also known as the model PD.336) was created by installing a Garrett AiResearch TPE-331-9 engine in the nose of a Beechcraft Baron 58P fuselage, which was mated to a Beechcraft B36TC Bonanza wing in place of the Baron's wing with two engines. This resulted in a low-wing aircraft with six seats including the pilot's. The aircraft flew for the first time on June 14, 1982. After 133 flights over almost 18 months the aircraft was temporarily grounded so that the TPE331 could be removed and a Pratt & Whitney Canada PT6A-40 engine fitted in its place. The aircraft flew in this configuration for the first time on March 9, 1984 and the last flight was on August 8 the same year. Beechcraft originally planned to put the Lightning into production but the economic downturn among general aviation manufacturers in the United States in the 1980s led to the project being shelved shortly after the first flight with PT6A power. Several Model 38Ps were pre sold to customers by the Beechcraft dealer network, but the purchase deposits collected were returned when the decision was made not to produce the aircraft.

== Variants ==
Model 38P
One prototype modified from a Model 58P Baron with a Garrett AiResearch TPE-331-9. Plans to produce the 38P with a Pratt & Whitney Canada PT6A-40 were abandoned.
Model 38P-1
To be powered by a Pratt & Whitney Canada PT6A-116. Not built.
Model 38P-2
To be powered by a Garrett AiResearch TPE-331-9. Not built.

== Specifications (Model 38P, PT6A engine, performance estimated) ==
Data from Jane's 1983–84 Aviation Review

General characteristics

- Crew: 1
- Capacity: 5 passengers
- Length: 29 ft 11 in (9.12 m)
- Wingspan: 37 ft 10 in (11.53 m)
- Powerplant: 1 × Pratt & Whitney Canada PT6A-40 turboprop, 550–650 shp (410–480 kW)

Performance

- Cruise speed: 316 mph (509 km/h, 275 kn) (max cruise, at 25,000 ft (7,600 m)
- Range: 1,285 mi (2,068 km, 1,117 nmi)
- Service ceiling: 25,000 ft (7,600 m)

== See also ==
Aircraft of comparable role, configuration, and era

- Piper Malibu Meridian
- Socata TBM
