= Dewon Brazelton =

American baseball player (born 1980)

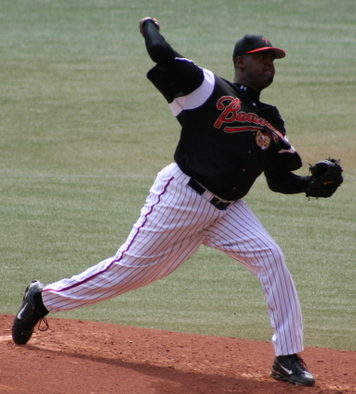
- Brazelton with the Portland Beavers in 2006
- Pitcher
- Born: June 16, 1980 (age 46); Tullahoma, Tennessee, U.S.
- Batted: Right Threw: Right

MLB debut
- September 13, 2002, for the Tampa Bay Devil Rays

Last MLB appearance
- May 11, 2006, for the San Diego Padres

MLB statistics
- Win–loss record: 8–25
- Earned run average: 6.38
- Strikeouts: 145
- Stats at Baseball Reference

Teams
- Tampa Bay Devil Rays (2002–2005); San Diego Padres (2006)

Dewon Cortez Brazelton (born June 16, 1980) is an American former professional baseball pitcher in Major League Baseball. He played for the Tampa Bay Rays and the San Diego Padres. He last pitched in the major leagues in 2006.

== Early life ==
Brazelton was born in Tullahoma, Tennessee and graduated from Tullahoma High School in Tullahoma. While pitching in high school, Brazelton had knee surgery in 1995, then Tommy John surgery in 1996. He played college baseball at Middle Tennessee State University. In 1999, he played collegiate summer baseball with the Harwich Mariners of the Cape Cod Baseball League.

== Professional career ==
The Tampa Bay Devil Rays selected him with the third overall draft pick in the first round of the 2001 MLB amateur draft, and Brazelton made his MLB debut September 13, 2002. In 2004, Brazelton, after being called the second coming of Roger Clemens by Peter Gammons, received the Tony Conigliaro Award.

After Stuart Sternberg took over as principal owner of the Devil Rays, Brazelton was traded during the 2005 annual baseball winter meetings to the Padres for third baseman Sean Burroughs.

In spring training of 2006, Brazelton appeared impressive, going 1–0 with a 1.77 ERA in 5 starts and earned the position of fourth starter in the Padres's four-man rotation, behind Jake Peavy, Chris Young, and Shawn Estes. However, Brazelton's first two starts were disastrous, taking the loss for both while pitching a combined 6 1/3 innings and giving up 17 hits and 17 earned runs. Brazelton was then moved to the bullpen and used as a spot reliever where between March 8 and April 19, he pitched 11.1 innings with a 2.31 ERA. However, on May 11 against the Milwaukee Brewers, Brazelton came in relief of Jake Peavy in the 8th inning with an 8–0 lead and gave up 4 runs on 3 hits and a walk without recording an out. Brazelton was promptly demoted to the Padres' Triple-A affiliate, the Portland Beavers, the following day and has not pitched in the major leagues since.

On December 4, 2006, the Kansas City Royals signed Brazelton to a minor league contract, only to be released from their Triple-A Omaha affiliate on April 27, 2007. On June 2, 2007, the Pittsburgh Pirates signed Brazelton to a minor league contract and assigned him to their Double-A affiliate, the Altoona Curve. After becoming a free agent, following the conclusion of the 2007 season, the St. Louis Cardinals signed Brazelton to a minor league contract, but he was released during spring training.

Brazelton signed with the Camden Riversharks on April 4, 2009.

On April 13, the Kansas City T-Bones of the Northern League signed Brazelton to a contract for the 2010 season. He pitched in just two games for them before being granted free agency.

Preceded by Victor Zambrano	Tampa Bay Devil Rays Opening Day; Starting pitcher 2005	Succeeded by Scott Kazmir
