= Beechcraft Heritage Museum =

- Location within Tennessee
- Former name: Staggerwing Museum
- Established: October 1973
- Location: Tullahoma, Tennessee
- Coordinates: 35.372180°N 86.244569°W
- Type: Aviation museum
- Founders: Jim Gorman; Glenn McNabb; John Parrish, Sr.; Carolyn Perry; Richard Perry; Louise Thaden; W. C. Yarbrough
- President: Charles Parish
- Curator: Kirby Totty
- Website: beechcrafthm.org

The Beechcraft Heritage Museum is an aviation museum at the Tullahoma Regional Airport in Tullahoma, Tennessee. It is focused on the history of the Beech Aircraft Corporation.

== History ==
The museum was founded by Carolyn and Richard Perry, Louise Thaden, W. C. Yarbrough, John Parrish, Sr., Jim Gorman and Glenn McNabb in October 1973 as the Staggerwing Museum Foundation. The museum opened to the public in June 1975 on land donated by John's wife Charlotte. The Beech Center, which acts as an entrance and lobby, was dedicated in 1995. It broke ground on the first phase of the Cianchette Hangar in 1998. It became the Beechcraft Heritage Museum in 2007. The museum dedicated a 36,000 sq ft (3,300 m^{2}) expansion to the Bonanza/Baron hangar and renamed it the Bost Hangar in October 2017.

== Collection ==
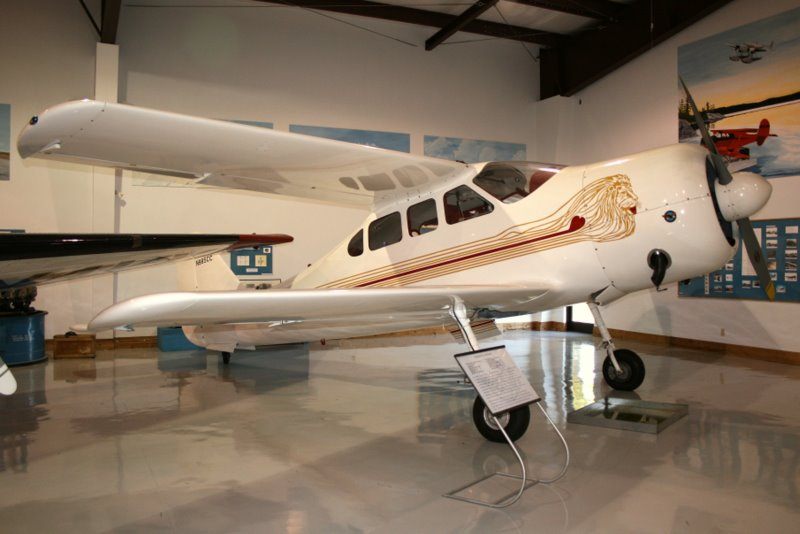
Cianchette Lionheart

- Bay Super V SV109
- Bayles Lightning RB01
- Beechcraft AT-11 Kansan 41-27516A
- Beechcraft 17R Staggerwing 1
- Beechcraft B17L Staggerwing 21
- Beechcraft C17L Staggerwing 100
- Beechcraft D17S Staggerwing 395
- Beechcraft D17S Staggerwing 4835
- Beechcraft E17B Staggerwing 231
- Beechcraft F17D Staggerwing 333
- Beechcraft G17S Staggerwing B-3
- Beechcraft G17S Staggerwing B-7
- Beechcraft S18D 178
- Beechcraft C-45H Expeditor AF-824
- Beechcraft D18S A-187
- Beechcraft 23 Musketeer M-6
- Beechcraft F33A Bonanza CD-556
- Beechcraft 35 Bonanza D-9
- Beechcraft 35 Bonanza D-18
- Beechcraft H35 Bonanza D-4982
- Beechcraft S35 Bonanza D-7450
- Beechcraft 36 Bonanza E-103
- Beechcraft A36 Bonanza E-1252
- Beechcraft A36 Bonanza E-1503
- Beechcraft D45 Mentor GL-1111
- Beechcraft D50E Twin Bonanza DH-326
- Beechcraft 58TC Baron TK-79
- Beechcraft B60 Duke P-596
- Beechcraft B95A Travel Air TD-500
- Beechcraft 95-55 TC-1
- Beechcraft 2000A Starship NC-49
- Beechcraft U-21 Ute LM-01
- Cianchette Lionheart 3
- Swallow TP 163
- Travel Air 1000 1
- Travel Air 4000 1295
- Travel Air Type R Mystery Ship 1

== Events ==
The museum holds an annual fly-in called the "Beech Party".

== See also ==
- List of aviation museums
