= Antonio London =

American football player (born 1971)

No. 51, 55, 57, 58
- Position: Linebacker

Personal information
- Born: April 14, 1971 (age 55); Tullahoma, Tennessee, U.S.
- Listed height: 6 ft 2 in (1.88 m)
- Listed weight: 238 lb (108 kg)

Career information
- High school: Tullahoma
- College: Alabama
- NFL draft: 1993: 3rd round, 62nd overall pick

Career history
- Detroit Lions (1993–1997); Green Bay Packers (1998); Philadelphia Eagles (1999)*; Denver Broncos (2001)*
- * Offseason or practice squad member only

Awards and highlights
- National champion (1992); First-team All-SEC (1992)

Career NFL statistics
- Tackles: 121
- Sacks: 13
- Forced fumbles: 7
- Stats at Pro Football Reference

Antonio Monte London (born April 14, 1971), nicknamed "Stick", is an American former professional football player who was a linebacker in the National Football League (NFL) for the Detroit Lions and Green Bay Packers.

== Biography ==
London was born in Tullahoma, Tennessee. He lettered in basketball, baseball, football and track at Tullahoma High School. He was an outstanding linebacker who earned a national championship ring while playing college football under Coach Gene Stallings at the University of Alabama in 1992.

He was selected by the Detroit Lions in the third round (62nd overall) of the 1993 NFL draft. He played linebacker for six seasons for the Detroit Lions and Green Bay Packers of the National Football League.

After retiring from the NFL, London moved to Pelham, Alabama and opened a facilities management company. He coaches high school football at Pelham High School in Pelham and hosts free football camps.
