= Griffon Aerospace MQM-170 Outlaw =

Military drone

MQM-170 Outlaw
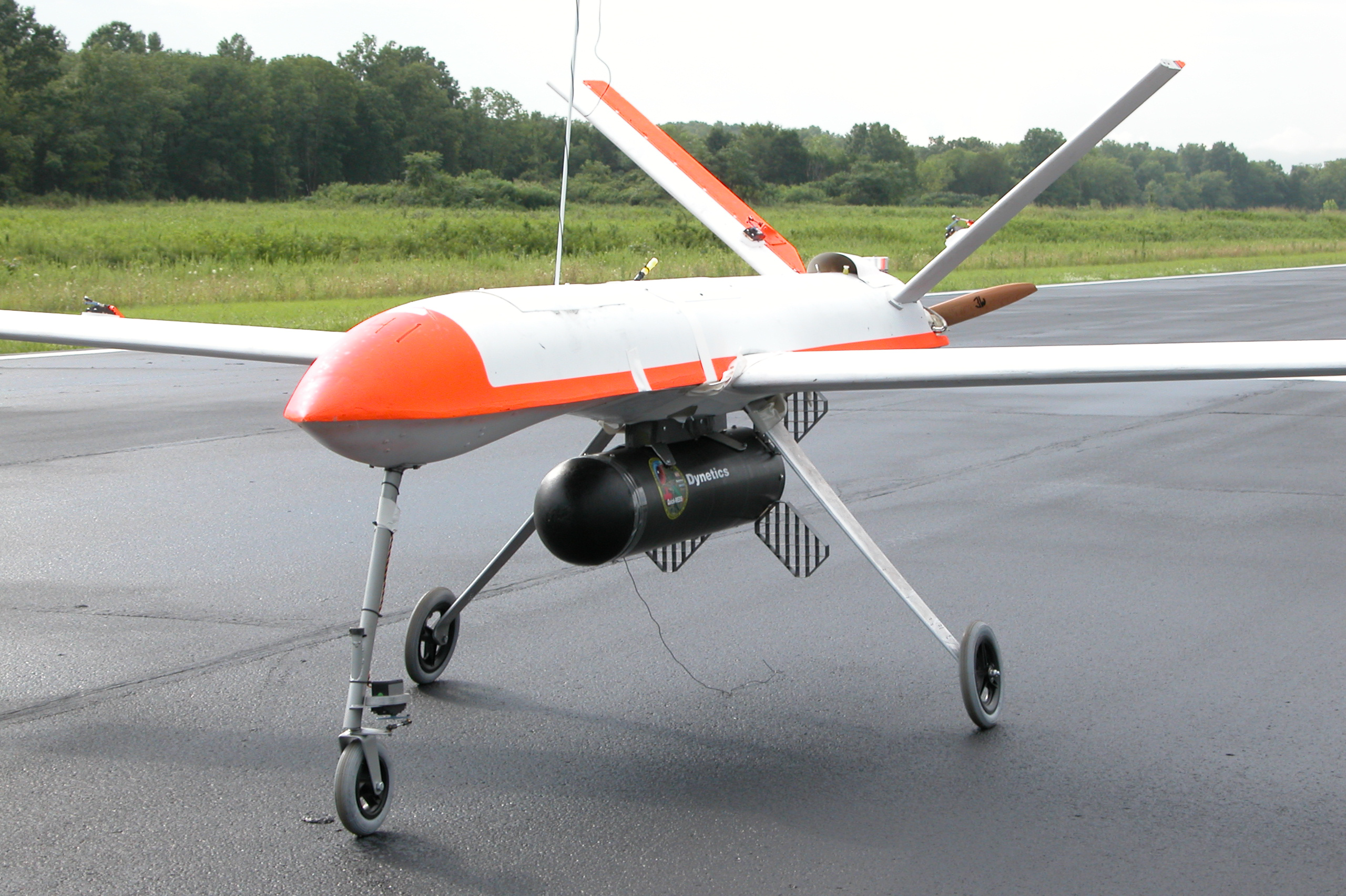

General information
- Type: 3W Model 150i 17 hp 2 cyl 2 stroke
- Manufacturer: Griffon Aerospace
- Designer: Larry A. French
- Primary users: United States Army: United States Navy; United States Marine Corps; United States Air Force
- Number built: over 2,200

History
- Manufactured: 2004–present
- Introduction date: July 2004
- First flight: 2003

The Griffon Aerospace MQM-170 Outlaw is an unmanned aerial vehicle which is used to support air defense artillery training, research, development, and test activities. It can serve as a target drone, surrogate training platform, or in a surrogate aerial reconnaissance and forward observation role. The aircraft has been in use since 2004.

The system consists of an air vehicle and a ground control station which includes an optional satellite link communication suite. The Outlaw may be launched pneumatically, or by runway takeoff when equipped with landing gear.
