= Tullahoma High School =

Location
- 1001 North Jackson Street; Tullahoma, Coffee, Tennessee; United States; 35.3715°N 86.22137°W

Information
- Type: Public high school
- Established: 1956
- Principal: Gregory English
- Teaching staff: 51.78 (FTE)
- Grades: 9-12
- Enrollment: 1,137 (2022-23)
- Student to teacher ratio: 21.96
- Campus: country side
- Colors: Cardinal red and black
- Mascot: Wildcat
- Rival: Franklin County High School
- Yearbook: Résume
- Website: https://ths.tcsedu.net/

Tullahoma High School is a public high school located in Tullahoma, Coffee County, Tennessee. It is operated by the Tullahoma City Schools.

== Campus ==
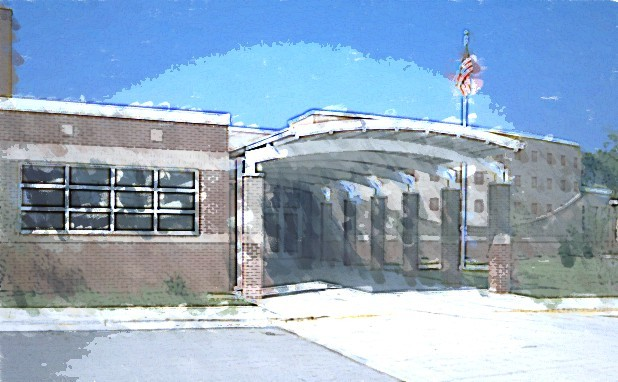

The current high school in Tullahoma was established on the North Jackson Street campus in 1956 and was known as the, "Million Dollar High School," due to the initial construction cost. The most recent addition to the building was the construction of the science wing in 1995. Work on the Wilkins Stadium began in March 2009 and the new stadium complex was completed as the 2009 school year opened. The THS Auditorium was redesigned and renovation was completed in May 2010. As of 2018, Tullahoma High School has upgraded their security policies.

== Programs ==
The Tullahoma High School Band competes annually in marching competitions in the fall and concert festivals in the spring. The vocal department supports three vocal groups, including the THS Aristocats.

The school's athletic program has had past state team championships in baseball and golf as well as individual championships in wrestling and track.

A Marine Corps Junior ROTC program was established in 2002.

=== High School 101 ===
In the 2010–11 school year, Tullahoma High School initiated a freshman academy called "High School 101" that is intended to provide small learning community for students in their first year in the high school. The school has since removed this program starting with the 23-24 school year.

=== Lawsuit ===
In 2023 a student was suspended for three days for posting memes that satirized Principal Jason Quick; the student filed a lawsuit using case law from the US Supreme Court Case (Mahanoy Area School District v. B.L.) to sue the Principal, School, and School District.

== Notable alumni ==
- Dewon Brazelton, professional baseball player
- Samantha Burton, actress
- David Hess, professional baseball player
- Steve Matthews, National Football League quarterback
- Antonio London, National Football League linebacker
- Dustin Lynch, singer/songwriter (graduated in 2003)
- Bryan Morris, professional baseball player
- Jordan Sheffield, professional baseball player
- Justus Sheffield, professional baseball player
- Craig Terry, Grammy-award winning pianist
- Jakobe Thomas, college football safety for the Miami Hurricanes

== See also ==
- List of high schools in Tennessee
- Public school funding in the United States
