= Griffon Aerospace =

American aerospace company

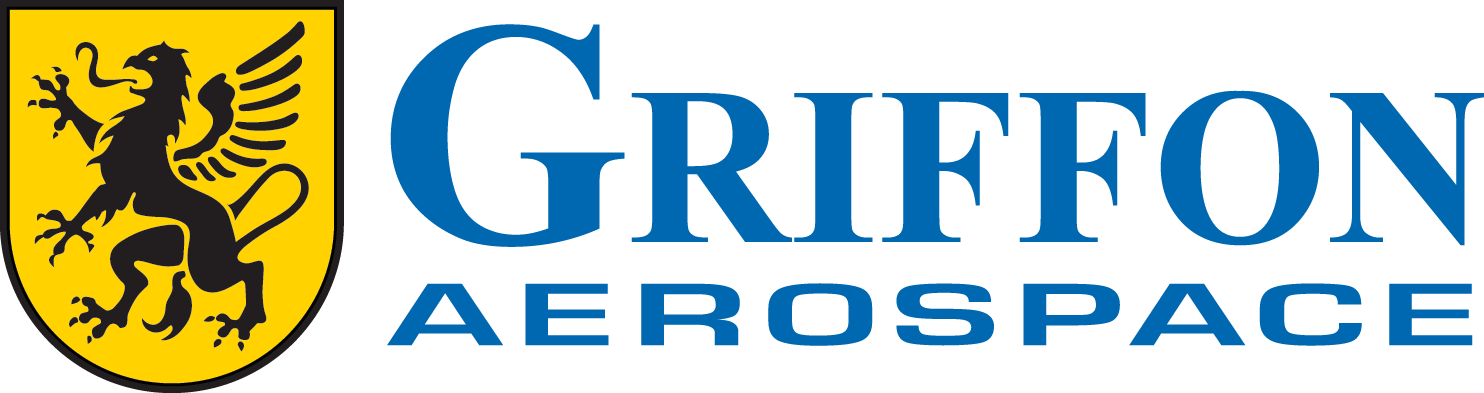
- Type: S Corporation
- Industry: Aerospace; Defense; Composite Structures
- Founded: 1995
- Headquarters: 106 Commerce Circle, Madison, Alabama, USA
- Area served: Worldwide
- Key people: Larry A. French (Owner/CEO) & (CTO)
- Products: UAS; Ground Support Equipment; Flight Operations; Composite Structures Manufacturing; Experimental Aircraft; Avionics
- Number of employees: 121 (2022)
- Website: www.griffonaerospace.com

Griffon Aerospace is an aerospace company located in Madison, Alabama with additional offices located in Fort Bliss, TX. Griffon designs, develops, and operates aerospace systems including manned and unmanned aircraft, UAV ground support systems, and advanced composite structures. Griffon has produced over 6000 unmanned air vehicles for a variety of customers from US DoD, Foreign Military Sales, Commercial Businesses, and University research labs.

== Aircraft ==
=== Unmanned Aerial Vehicles ===
==== Outlaw G2E ====
| Length | 2.7 m (8 ft 8 in) |
| Wingspan | 4.9 m (16 ft 0 in) |
| Weight | 81.7 kg (180lb) |
| Speed | max: 185 km/h (115 mph); cruise: 120 km/h (75 mph) |
| Ceiling | 3658+ m (12000+ ft) |
| Endurance | Maximum: 6 h |
| Propulsion | 3W Model 150i two-cylinder two-stroke piston engine; 12.6 kW (17 hp) |

==== Outlaw SeaHunter ====
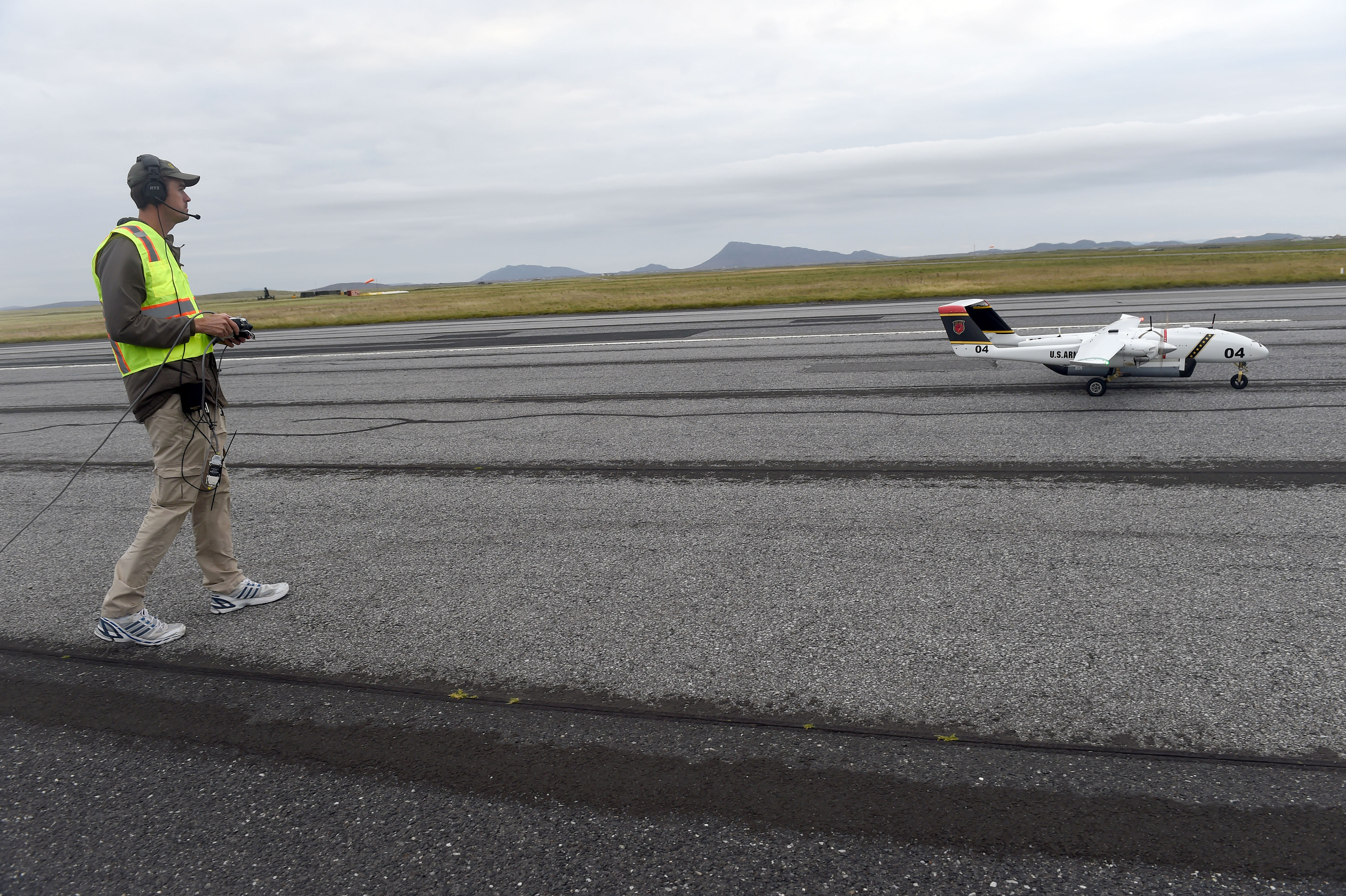
Mark Dyess of Griffon Aerospace uses a remote control to pilot a SeaHunter UAV

| Length | 3.0 m (9 ft 11 in) |
| Wingspan | 4.9 m (16 ft 0 in) |
| Weight | 86 kg (190 lb) |
| Speed | max: 241 km/h (150 mph); cruise: 139 km/h (86 mph) |
| Ceiling | 5500 m (18000 ft) |
| Endurance | standard: 4 h; max: 8–9 h |
| Propulsion | Two – 3W Model 150i two-cylinder two-stroke Reciprocating engine; 12.6 kW (17 hp) |

=== Targets ===
==== BroadSword ====
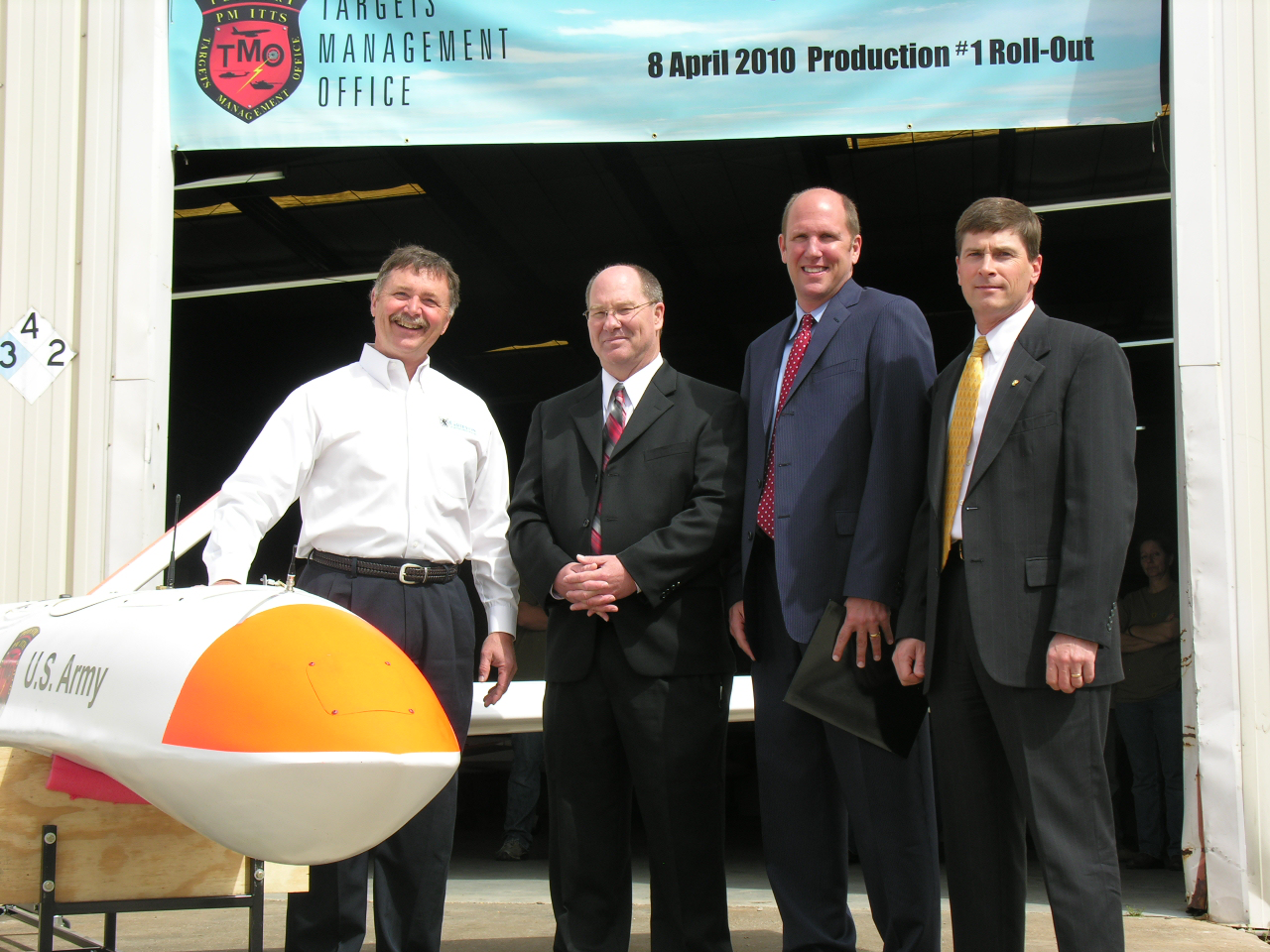
BroadSword aircraft next to Griffon Aerospace owner Larry A. French (left) during the BroadSword rollout

The BroadSword, also known as the MQM-171A BroadSword, is an unmanned aircraft system (UAS) developed to represent a generic tactical class unmanned aircraft system that could be deployed against the U.S. and allied forces in the field.

BroadSword is a 500-pound class, 17-foot wingspan aircraft.

==== Outlaw G1 ====
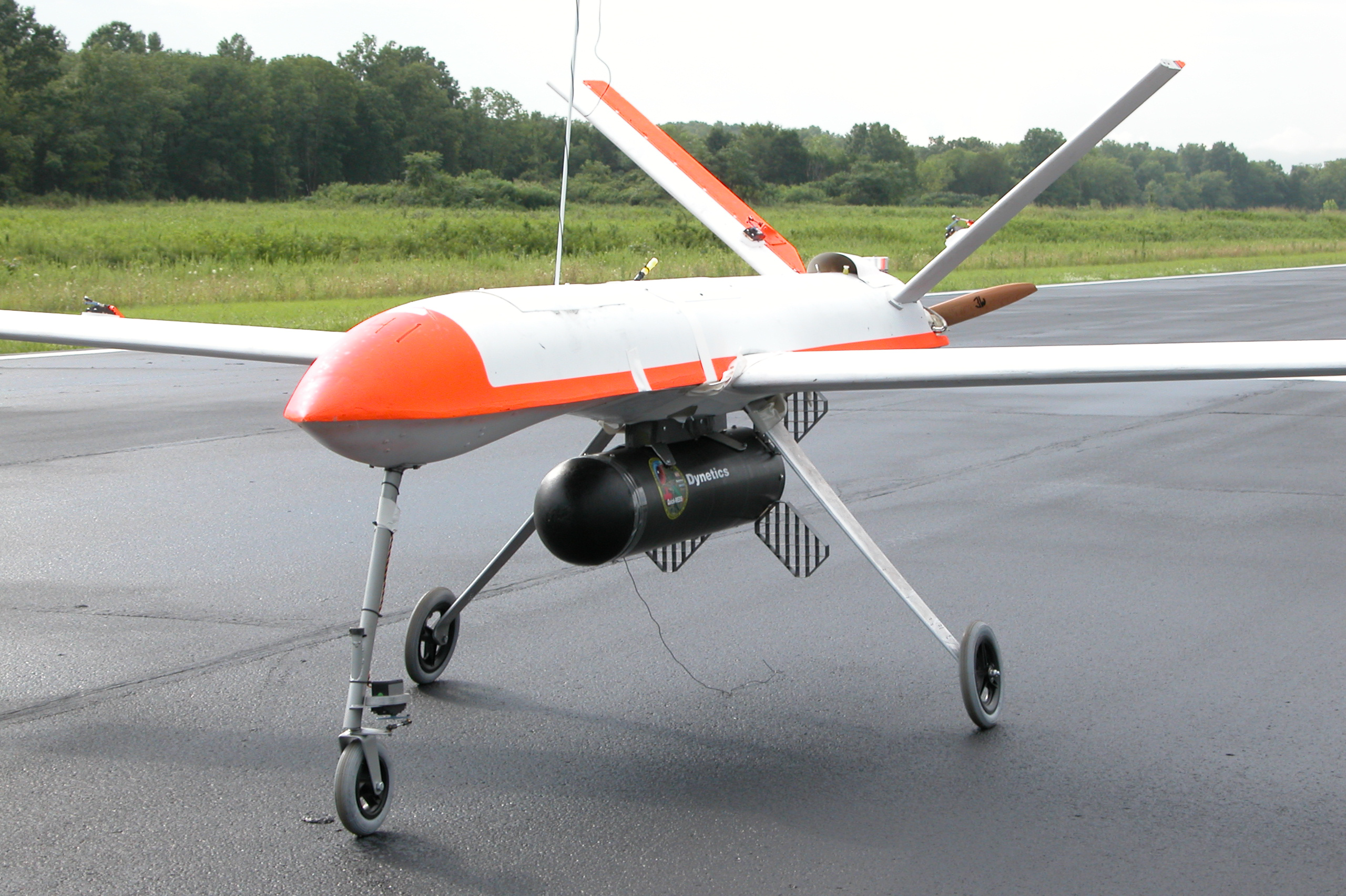
Outlaw G1

| Length | 2.70 m (8 ft 10 in) |
| Wingspan | 4.15 m (13 ft 7 in) |
| Weight | 54 kg (120 lb) |
| Speed | max: 193 km/h (120 mph); cruise: 95 km/h (59 mph) |
| Ceiling | 4900 m (16000 ft) |
| Endurance | standard: 1 h; max: 3–4 h |
| Propulsion | 3W Model 150i two-cylinder two-stroke piston engine; 12.6 kW (17 hp) |

==== Outlaw G2 ====
The Outlaw G2 also known as the Outlaw MQM-170C G2 is an unmanned aerial vehicle (UAV) and the successor to the Outlaw G1. The G2 utilizes many of the key components from the G1, such as the engine, radio and autopilot control systems. These components are integrated into a larger fuselage that offers increased aerodynamic efficiency and enhanced visual signature, along with a bigger payload area and increased fuel capacity.

The Outlaw G2 is used primarily for weapon systems training in countering airborne threats. The U.S. Army's current, interim and future forces use the RPVT to train Soldiers and where appropriate, test new weapon systems and procedures to counter asymmetric threats including unmanned aircraft systems (UAS).

| Length | 2.7 m (8 ft 10 in) |
| Wingspan | 3.3 m (10 ft 10 in) |
| Weight | |
| Speed | max: 201 km/h (125 mph); cruise: 120 km/h (75 mph) |
| Ceiling | 4267 m (14000 ft) |
| Endurance | standard: 3 h; max: 5 h |
| Propulsion | 3W Model 150i two-cylinder two-stroke piston engine; 12.6 kW (17 hp) |

=== Legacy Vehicles ===
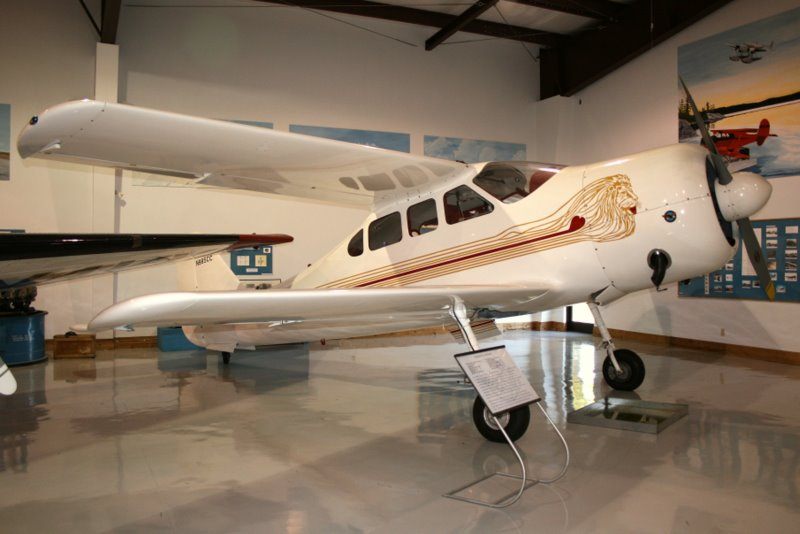
A Lionheart on display at the Beechcraft Heritage Museum in Tullahoma, Tennessee, US

== History ==
Established in 1995 by Larry French, the company was formed to design, develop, and manufacture a manned composite kit aircraft.

Griffon's first aircraft was the single-engined six seat Lionheart. The design and development began at Larry's home in Harvest, Alabama where he worked designing and developing a composite aircraft formed around the Pratt & Whitney R-985 450 horsepower radial engine. The stagger wing design pays compliment to the classic Beechcraft 17 Staggerwing.

Pre-sales of the Lionheart took place in 1995 and 1996 at the annual Experimental Aircraft Show at Oshkosh. Lionheart's first flight was 28 July 1997 and 48 hours later it flew into Oshkosh. The aircraft was featured on the cover of the October 1997 Kit Planes Magazine. Enough orders were placed for Larry French to take on Griffon Aerospace as his full-time occupation. The company moved into a 5,000-square-foot (460 m^{2}) facility at 901 Nick Fitchard in Huntsville. Griffon also gained some investors who provided working capital for the new company.

In 2002, Griffon began to expand into composite structures for NASA applications through a subcontract with Northrop Grumman for composite cryogenic tanks. During that same time period, Griffon also began designing a prototype 130-pound gross weight unmanned aircraft eventually designated the MQM-170A Outlaw. In February 2003, Griffon submitted a proposal in response to the US Army AMCOM Remotely Piloted Vehicle Target (RPVT) offering and Griffon was awarded the RPVT contract in August 2003. A few months later Lockheed awarded Griffon a large contract to build a full-scale composite Crew Capsule.

In 2004, the addition of the US Army's new five-year RPVT production contract allowed Griffon Aerospace to expand, producing between 50 and 80 Outlaw aircraft per month at one point. Griffon also put together flight crews to fly the unmanned aircraft for the US Army and foreign military customers. As of 2012 Griffon has produced over 3,000 unmanned aircraft and has flown over 110,000 sorties and maintained a loss rate under 1%.

In 2009, Griffon Aerospace won the recompete for the Outlaw MQM-170A. Also in 2009, Griffon was awarded a sole-source contract for the MQM-171A Broadsword a 600-pound gross weight unmanned aircraft. Also in 2009, the US Navy also awarded Griffon Aerospace a contract for the manufacture, operation, and maintenance of a modified version of the Outlaw MQM-170A, as of 2012, Griffon has delivered 500 US Navy aircraft. As of 2018 Griffon has produced over 5,400 UAV aircraft. In August 2012, Griffon was awarded a large id/iq contract for aerial target services with US Army Target Management Office. Griffon was awarded the Northrop Supplier of the Year for 2009 for its advanced composite work on the NASA MLAS program. In October 2012, Griffon was awarded a multimillion-dollar subcontract from Northrop Grumman to build a sub-scale tank for a NASA risk reduction program.

Griffon introduced its Outlaw G2 Aircraft at the 2012 AUVSI show in Las Vegas. The G2 aircraft will replace the current MQM-170A model aircraft.

In April 2010, Griffon Aerospace and US Army officials rolled out their second UAV system, the BroadSword.

== Gallery ==
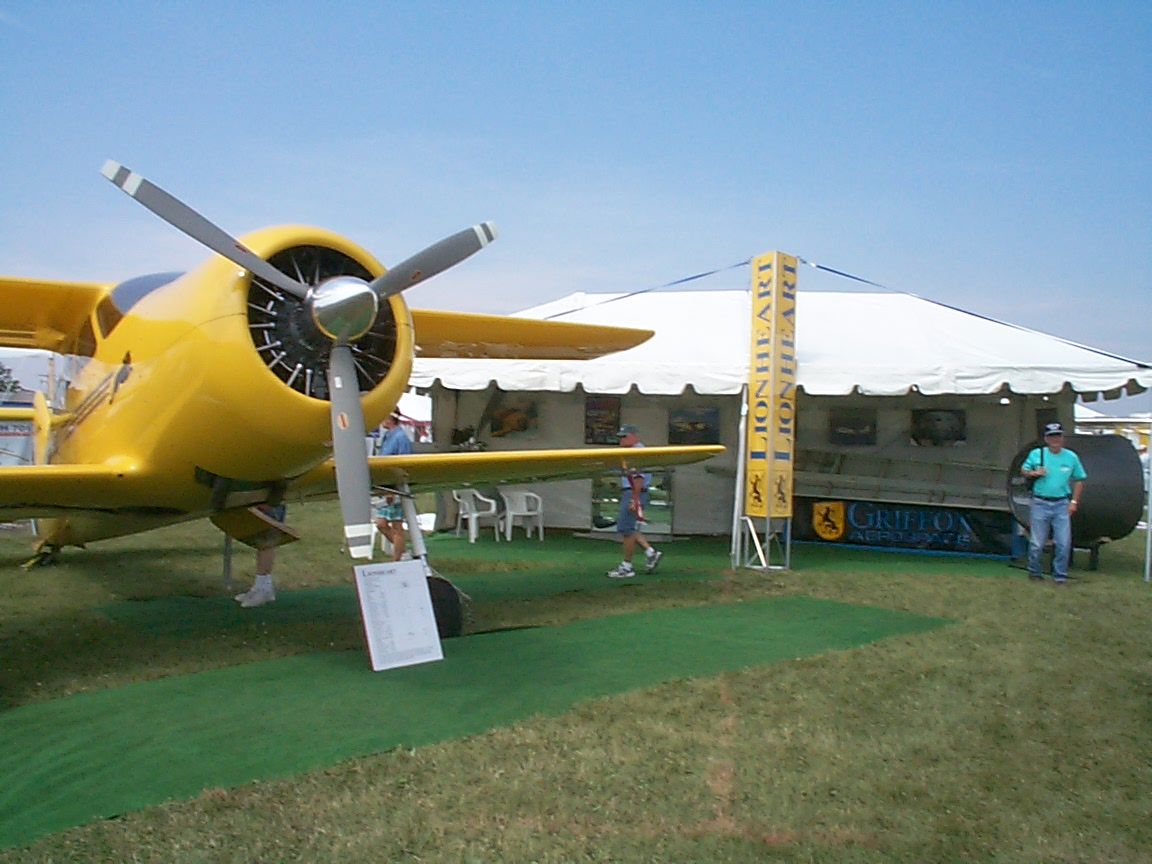
Griffon Display at Oshkosh

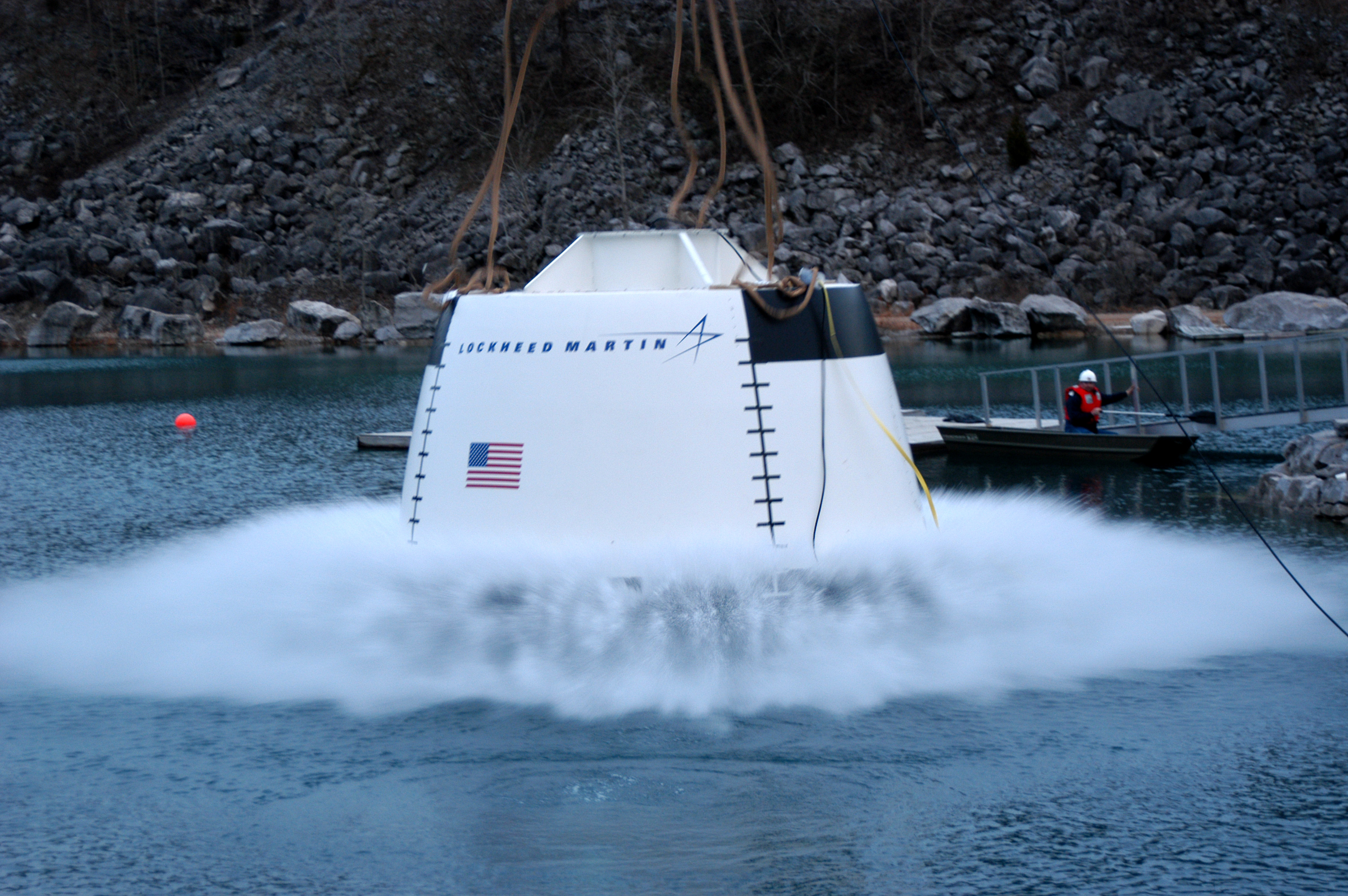
Griffon Composite Capsule during test

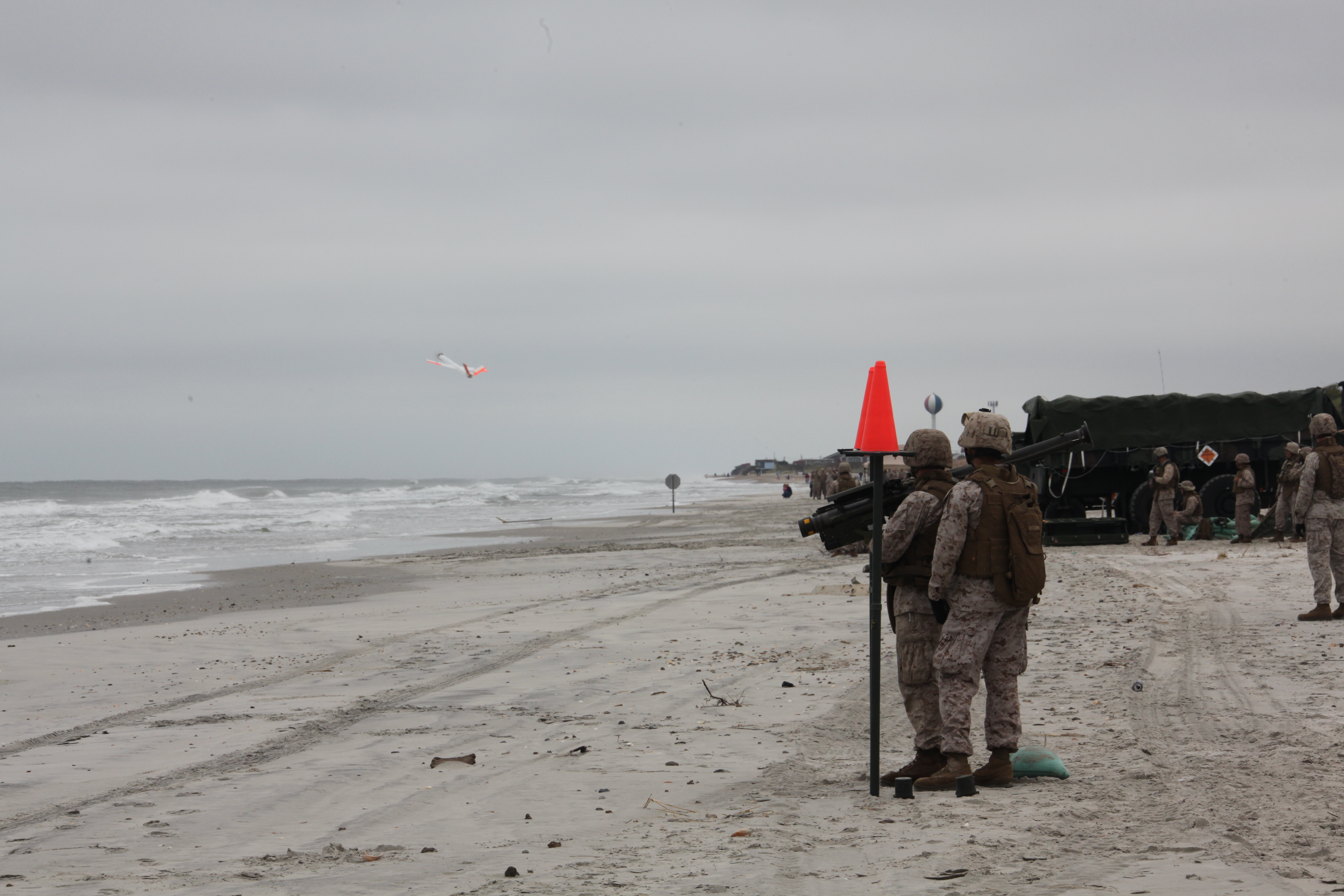
Outlaw G1 during USMC testing

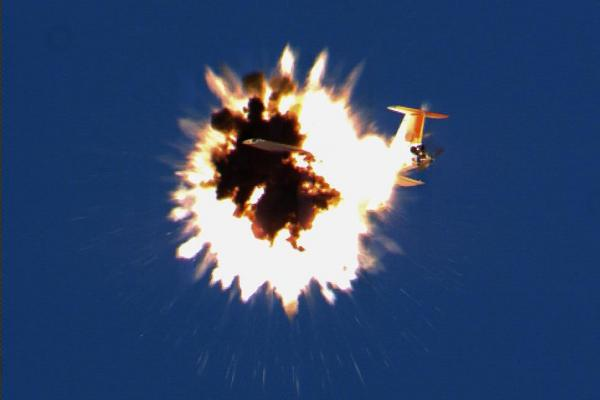

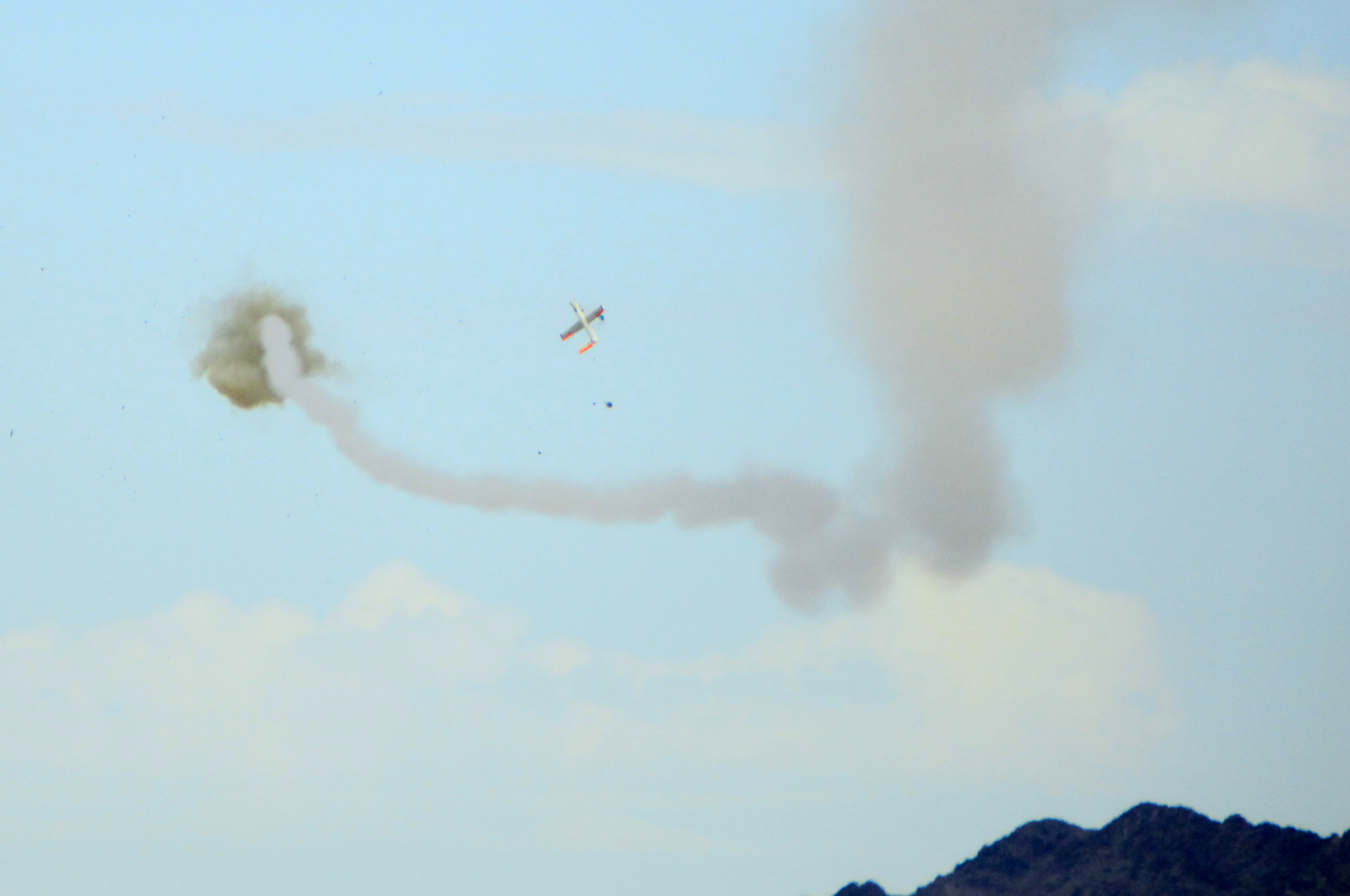
Outlaw G1 following a hit during USMC testing
