= Tullahoma Regional Airport =

Tullahoma Regional Airport William Northern Field
- IATA: THA; ICAO: KTHA; FAA LID: THA

Summary
- Airport type: Public
- Owner: City of Tullahoma
- Serves: Tullahoma, Tennessee
- Elevation AMSL: 1,084 ft (330 m)
- Coordinates: 35°22′48″N 086°14′48″W
- Website: TullahomaTN.gov/airport

Map
- Location of airport in Tennessee THA (the United States)

Runways
Direction	Length		Surface
Direction	ft	m	Surface
6/24	5,501	1,677	Asphalt/concrete
18/36	5,002	1,525	Asphalt/concrete
9/27	2,693	821	Turf

Statistics (2009)
- Aircraft operations: 30,400
- Based aircraft: 123
- Source: Federal Aviation Administration

Tullahoma Regional Airport (IATA: THA, ICAO: KTHA, FAA LID: THA), also known as William Northern Field and Soesbe-Martin Field, is a public use airport in Coffee County, Tennessee, United States. It is owned by the City of Tullahoma and located two nautical miles (4 km) northwest of its central business district. This airport is included in the National Plan of Integrated Airport Systems for 2011–2015, which categorized it as a general aviation facility.

== History ==
The airport received permission to build 11 new hangars in October 2023.

== Facilities and aircraft ==
Tullahoma Regional Airport covers an area of 594 acres (240 ha) at an elevation of 1,084 feet (330 m) above mean sea level. It has three runways: 6/24 is 5,501 by 150 feet (1,677 x 46 m) and 18/36 is 5,002 by 100 feet (1,525 x 30 m), both with asphalt/concrete surfaces; 9/27 is 2,693 by 100 feet (821 x 30 m) with a turf surface.

For the 12-month period ending April 8, 2009, the airport had 30,400 aircraft operations, an average of 83 per day: 97% general aviation, 2% air taxi, and 1% military. At that time there were 123 aircraft based at this airport: 84% single-engine, 12% multi-engine, 2% jet, and 2% helicopter.

The Beechcraft Heritage Museum is Located on the south side of the airport.

== Accidents and incidents ==
- On June 8, 2025, a skydiving De Havilland Canada DHC-6 Twin Otter plane carrying twenty people crashed in an open area near Old Shelbyville Highway while taking off from the airport. Multiple people were injured, including several who were transported to hospitals by medical helicopters, two critically and others evaluated at the scene. The Federal Aviation Administration and the National Transportation Safety Board are investigating the accident.

== See also ==
- List of airports in Tennessee
