= Tullahoma, Tennessee =

- City
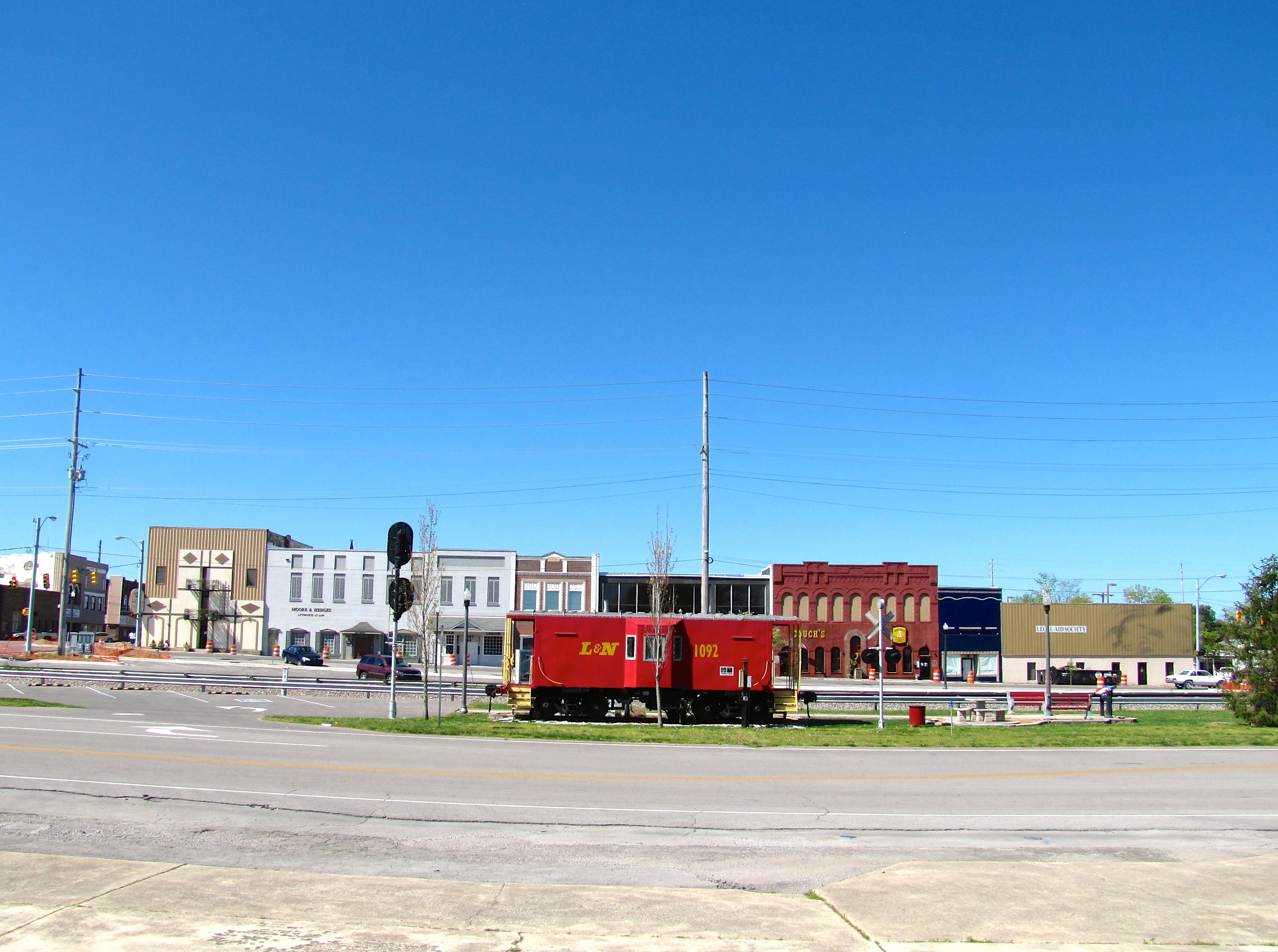
- Caboose Park in downtown Tullahoma

- Flag Seal
- Nickname: Queen City
- Motto: Tennessee's Rising Star
- Location of Tullahoma in Coffee and Franklin Counties, Tennessee.
- Coordinates: 35°22′7″N 86°12′48″W
- Country: United States
- State: Tennessee
- Counties: Coffee, Franklin
- Incorporated: October 4, 1852

Government
  - Mayor: Ray Knowis

Area
  - Total: 23.49 sq mi (60.85 km^{2})
  - Land: 23.44 sq mi (60.71 km^{2})
  - Water: 0.058 sq mi (0.15 km^{2})
- Elevation: 1,073 ft (327 m)

Population (2020)
  - Total: 20,339
  - Density: 867.7/sq mi (335.02/km^{2})
- Time zone: UTC−6 (Central (CST))
  - Summer (DST): UTC−5 (CDT)
- ZIP Codes: 37388–37389
- Area code: 931
- FIPS code: 47-75320
- GNIS feature ID: 1272964
- Website: www.tullahomatn.gov

Tullahoma is a city in Coffee and Franklin counties in southern Middle Tennessee, United States. The population was 20,339 at the 2020 census. In 2019, the population was estimated to be 19,555. It is the principal city of the Tullahoma micropolitan area (a 2009 estimate placed it at 99,927), which consists of Coffee and Moore counties and is the second largest micropolitan area in Tennessee. The city is also partially in the Winchester Micropolitan area.

== History ==
Tullahoma was founded in 1852 as a work camp along the new Nashville and Chattanooga Railroad. Its name is derived from the Choctaw phrase tʋli homma, meaning "red rock". An alternative explanation (see Sam Davis Elliott's Soldier of Tennessee and sources cited therein) of the name is that Peter Decherd, who donated the land for the railroad right-of-way (and was therefore given the right to name two stations along the line), named one station Decherd, after himself, and the other as Tulkahoma (later changed to Tullahoma). Tullahoma was the name of Decherd's favorite horse, which had been named for a Choctaw chief captured by Decherd's grandfather. (There was also a town called Tullahoma in Mississippi, which later changed its name to Grenada.)

The earliest settlement was by farmers from Virginia and North Carolina. Using African-American slave labor, they developed plantations for tobacco and hemp. Slaves also tended their livestock, both horses and cattle. Early families were named Moore, Decherd (pronounced as Deckerd), Anderson, Ragon, Montgomery, Ferrell, Stephenson, and Gunn.

They called a nearby spring Bottle Spring, though it was later known as John Gunn's Spring, since it was on his property. Nowadays, it is called Big Springs. This spring provided water for the steam locomotives. Later it was exploited for health and tourist attractions, as the town developed spa facilities.

When the Civil War began in April 1861, Company B, 1st Regiment of Tennessee Volunteers, was formed in Tullahoma. It joined General Robert E. Lee's Army of Northern Virginia. The division fought in the battles of Bull Run, Fredericksburg, Chancellorsville, Gettysburg, and Petersburg, before surrendering to Union General Ulysses S. Grant at Appomattox.

During the war, Tullahoma served in 1863 as the headquarters for the Confederate Army of Tennessee. That year the Union Army undertook the Tullahoma Campaign, defeating Confederate forces and taking control of Middle Tennessee. Federal troops occupied this area for the duration of the war. As a result of the campaign, Union forces captured Chattanooga.

Tullahoma was little more than a rough frontier outpost, and had no paved streets. 1863 was a wet year, and the place became known to the bedraggled troops of both sides as a place of endless mud. An aide on Confederate General William Hardee's staff is said to have written his own account of the origin of the name: "It is from two Greek words – 'Tulla' meaning mud, and 'Homa,' meaning more mud."

The selection of Tullahoma as a headquarters by Confederate General Braxton Bragg has been much criticized by military historians. Although the location was strategic with regard to the road and rail network, it had no strong natural defenses. Bragg did little to fortify it while his forces occupied the area. Eventually the town was evacuated without a battle.

After the war, Tullahoma recovered slowly, but began to prosper owing to its railroad link. It became renowned for its educational facilities, a rarity in the area at the time.

At the turn of the 20th century, Tullahoma became a popular health destination, with many spas across town to take advantage of Big Springs.

Manufacturing was developed in the area, notably of shoes, clothing, and sporting goods. In 1924, the General Shoe Corporation was established here, which eventually developed as Genesco. The diversified apparel firm is Tennessee's oldest listed firm on the New York Stock Exchange. Since the early 1900s, a variety of sports products have been manufactured in Tullahoma, including baseballs, bats, and golf clubs by Campbell Mfg, Wilsons, Worth Sports, Tennessee Tanning Co. and Rawlings.

In 1939, U.S. Route 41A was built through town. This improved access between the town and Nashville, 71 miles (114 km) to the northwest, and Chattanooga, 77 miles (124 km) to the southeast.

The noted whiskey brand of George Dickel is made in Cascade Hollow, just north of Tullahoma near Normandy, TN. Jack Daniel's whiskey is distilled 12 miles (19 km) southwest of Tullahoma in Lynchburg.

From the 1930s to mid-20th century, the area benefited from considerable federal investment and development: the projects of the Tennessee Valley Authority constructed dams and related facilities to generate hydroelectric power and electrify many rural areas, as well as providing needed jobs during the Great Depression. Camp Forrest was established during World War II as an infantry training center and later POW camp. The Arnold Engineering Development Complex (AEDC) was constructed near Tullahoma after WWII as a major development and test center for the Air Force and other DOD organizations, as well as NASA. Woods Reservoir was built to provide cooling water for AEDC. It was instrumental in the development of numerous aerospace systems, as well development for the Mercury, Gemini, and Apollo space programs. It remains as the most advanced and largest complex of flight simulation test facilities in the world. Later the state established two institutions of higher learning here, the Motlow State Community College and an aerospace engineering graduate school, the University of Tennessee Space Institute.

Today manufacturing makes up a smaller part of the Tullahoma economy. The town's growth has been steady though slow since the late 20th century, based on a mixture of education, services, tourism, and retail. The area is a major hub for aerospace, particularly aerospace ground testing, due to the presence of AEDC and the Space Institute. The former Sverdrup Technology Inc., now a subsidy of Jacobs Engineering, is a major supplier of wind tunnels, test equipment and support. Microcraft, Inc., which built the first air-breathing flight vehicles to reach Mach 7-10 under the NASA X-43a program, is located near the downtown square. A national aircraft preservation museum, Beechcraft Heritage Museum, was established on grounds south of the city's municipal airport.

Tullahoma celebrated its 150th (sesquicentennial) anniversary on October 4, 2002.

Rock pioneer Little Richard Penniman died in Tullahoma in 2020.

The town was featured in the song, "Tullahoma Dancing Pizza Man" by Eddie Rabbitt off of the album "Rocky Mountain Music." The town was also featured in the 2020 Tullahoma (album) by Dustin Lynch.

== Geography ==
Tullahoma is located in the southwest corner of Coffee County at 35°22′7″N 86°12′48″W (35.368511, -86.213258), and extends south into Franklin County. It is situated at the edge of the Highland Rim, with flatter topography than in the surrounding area. The region was known as "the Barrens" to the first settlers.

According to the United States Census Bureau, the city has a total area of 23.6 square miles (61.0 km^{2}), of which 23.5 square miles (60.8 km^{2}) is land and 0.1 square miles (0.2 km^{2}), or 0.30%, is water.

=== Climate ===
Climate is characterized by relatively high temperatures and evenly distributed precipitation throughout the year. The Köppen Climate Classification subtype for this climate is "Cfa" (Humid Subtropical Climate).

Climate data for Tullahoma, Tennessee (1991–2020 normals, extremes 1895–present)
| Month | Jan | Feb | Mar | Apr | May | Jun | Jul | Aug | Sep | Oct | Nov | Dec | Year |
|---|---|---|---|---|---|---|---|---|---|---|---|---|---|
| Record high °F (°C) | 78 (26) | 82 (28) | 87 (31) | 92 (33) | 97 (36) | 105 (41) | 106 (41) | 104 (40) | 105 (41) | 96 (36) | 84 (29) | 76 (24) | 106 (41) |
| Mean maximum °F (°C) | 66.3 (19.1) | 70.2 (21.2) | 76.8 (24.9) | 82.8 (28.2) | 87.3 (30.7) | 91.8 (33.2) | 93.7 (34.3) | 93.4 (34.1) | 90.6 (32.6) | 83.6 (28.7) | 75.7 (24.3) | 67.2 (19.6) | 95.3 (35.2) |
| Mean daily maximum °F (°C) | 48.2 (9.0) | 52.5 (11.4) | 60.8 (16.0) | 70.4 (21.3) | 77.5 (25.3) | 84.3 (29.1) | 87.3 (30.7) | 86.9 (30.5) | 81.5 (27.5) | 71.4 (21.9) | 60.0 (15.6) | 51.2 (10.7) | 69.3 (20.7) |
| Daily mean °F (°C) | 38.5 (3.6) | 42.2 (5.7) | 49.7 (9.8) | 58.6 (14.8) | 66.6 (19.2) | 74.1 (23.4) | 77.5 (25.3) | 76.6 (24.8) | 70.5 (21.4) | 59.6 (15.3) | 48.5 (9.2) | 41.4 (5.2) | 58.6 (14.8) |
| Mean daily minimum °F (°C) | 28.9 (−1.7) | 31.8 (−0.1) | 38.6 (3.7) | 46.8 (8.2) | 55.6 (13.1) | 63.8 (17.7) | 67.8 (19.9) | 66.4 (19.1) | 59.6 (15.3) | 47.8 (8.8) | 37.1 (2.8) | 31.7 (−0.2) | 48.0 (8.9) |
| Mean minimum °F (°C) | 10.2 (−12.1) | 15.1 (−9.4) | 21.4 (−5.9) | 30.3 (−0.9) | 40.3 (4.6) | 52.9 (11.6) | 59.5 (15.3) | 57.8 (14.3) | 45.0 (7.2) | 31.4 (−0.3) | 21.6 (−5.8) | 16.2 (−8.8) | 8.0 (−13.3) |
| Record low °F (°C) | −20 (−29) | −22 (−30) | 0 (−18) | 20 (−7) | 29 (−2) | 39 (4) | 47 (8) | 46 (8) | 27 (−3) | 19 (−7) | −6 (−21) | −8 (−22) | −22 (−30) |
| Average precipitation inches (mm) | 5.30 (135) | 5.79 (147) | 6.04 (153) | 5.36 (136) | 4.80 (122) | 5.41 (137) | 4.64 (118) | 4.09 (104) | 4.35 (110) | 3.76 (96) | 4.70 (119) | 6.38 (162) | 60.62 (1,540) |
| Average snowfall inches (cm) | 0.9 (2.3) | 1.1 (2.8) | 0.8 (2.0) | 0.0 (0.0) | 0.0 (0.0) | 0.0 (0.0) | 0.0 (0.0) | 0.0 (0.0) | 0.0 (0.0) | 0.0 (0.0) | 0.0 (0.0) | 0.0 (0.0) | 2.8 (7.1) |
| Average precipitation days (≥ 0.01 in) | 12.0 | 12.3 | 12.6 | 10.9 | 11.1 | 11.1 | 11.6 | 9.3 | 8.0 | 8.6 | 9.4 | 12.7 | 129.6 |
| Average snowy days (≥ 0.1 in) | 0.8 | 0.9 | 0.6 | 0.0 | 0.0 | 0.0 | 0.0 | 0.0 | 0.0 | 0.0 | 0.0 | 0.4 | 2.7 |
Source: NOAA

== Demographics ==
Historical population
| Census | Pop. | Note | %± |
|---|---|---|---|
| 1860 | 586 | | — |
| 1870 | 589 | | 0.5% |
| 1880 | 1,083 | | 83.9% |
| 1890 | 2,439 | | 125.2% |
| 1900 | 2,684 | | 10.0% |
| 1910 | 3,049 | | 13.6% |
| 1920 | 3,479 | | 14.1% |
| 1930 | 4,023 | | 15.6% |
| 1940 | 4,549 | | 13.1% |
| 1950 | 7,562 | | 66.2% |
| 1960 | 12,242 | | 61.9% |
| 1970 | 15,311 | | 25.1% |
| 1980 | 15,800 | | 3.2% |
| 1990 | 16,761 | | 6.1% |
| 2000 | 17,994 | | 7.4% |
| 2010 | 18,655 | | 3.7% |
| 2020 | 20,339 | | 9.0% |
| 2025 (est.) | 21,279 | ▲ | 4.6% |

=== 2020 census ===
As of the 2020 census, Tullahoma had a population of 20,339, with 8,330 households and 5,181 families residing in the city.

The median age was 40.0 years. 23.5% of residents were under the age of 18 and 19.6% of residents were 65 years of age or older. For every 100 females there were 91.9 males, and for every 100 females age 18 and over there were 88.2 males age 18 and over.

Of the 8,330 households, 30.6% had children under the age of 18 living in them. Of all households, 43.1% were married-couple households, 18.7% were households with a male householder and no spouse or partner present, and 30.9% were households with a female householder and no spouse or partner present. About 30.0% of all households were made up of individuals and 13.5% had someone living alone who was 65 years of age or older.

There were 8,987 housing units, of which 7.3% were vacant. The homeowner vacancy rate was 1.7% and the rental vacancy rate was 5.3%.

93.1% of residents lived in urban areas, while 6.9% lived in rural areas.

Racial composition as of the 2020 census
| Race | Number | Percent |
|---|---|---|
| White | 16,831 | 82.8% |
| Black or African American | 1,326 | 6.5% |
| American Indian and Alaska Native | 79 | 0.4% |
| Asian | 211 | 1.0% |
| Native Hawaiian and Other Pacific Islander | 30 | 0.1% |
| Some other race | 419 | 2.1% |
| Two or more races | 1,443 | 7.1% |
| Hispanic or Latino (of any race) | 944 | 4.6% |

=== 2010 census ===
As of the 2010 census, there was a population of 18,655, with 7,717 households and 5,161 families residing in the city. The racial makeup of the city was 88.1% White, 7.0% African American, 0.2% Native American, 1.2% Asian, 1.1% from other races, and 2.5% from two or more races. Hispanic or Latino of any race were 3.1% of the population.

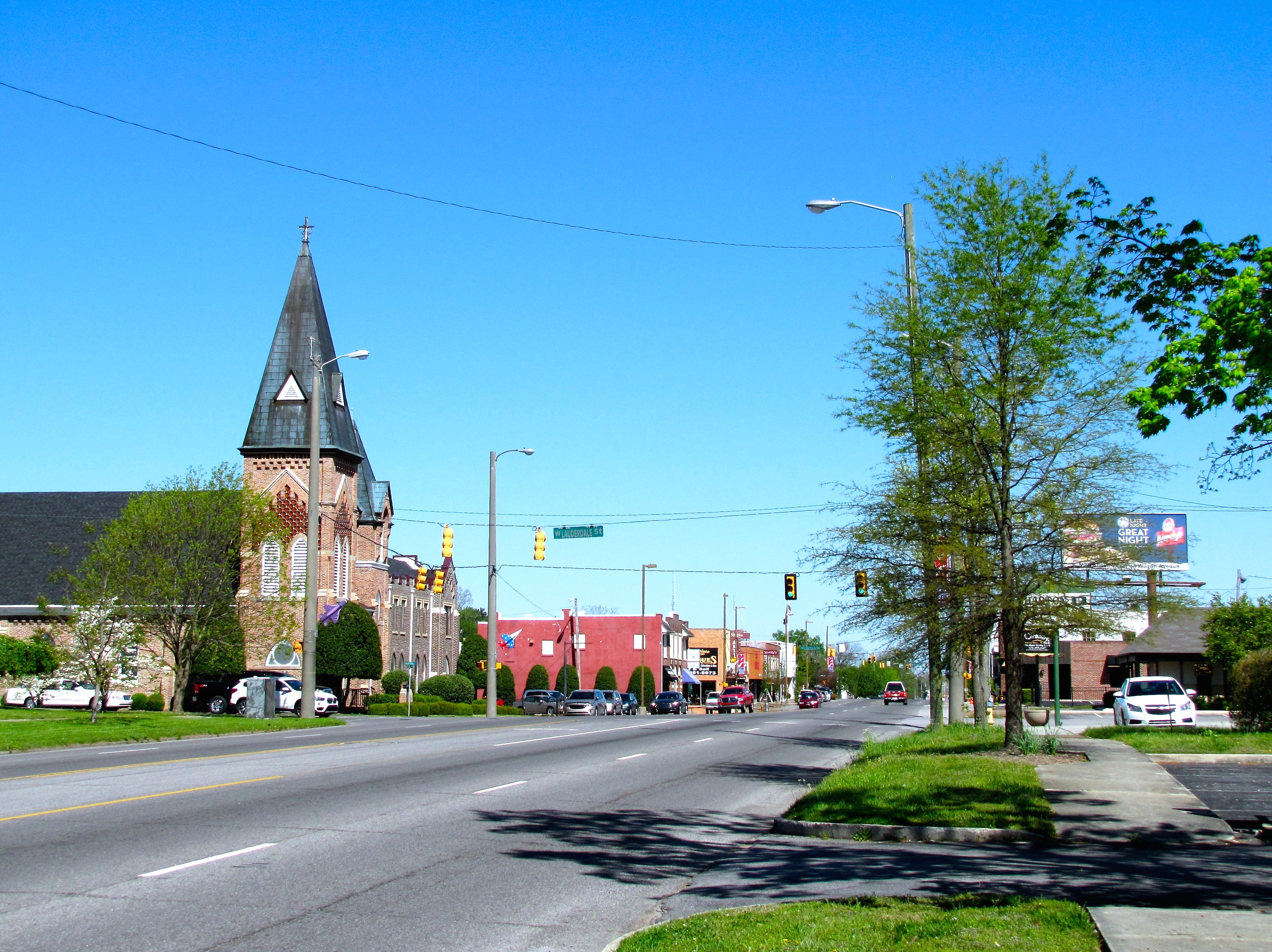
South Jackson Street

=== 2000 census ===
As of the 2000 census, there was a population of 17,994, with 7,336 households and 5,039 families residing in the city. The population density was 809.6 inhabitants per square mile (312.6/km^{2}). There were 7,890 housing units at an average density of 355.0 per square mile (137.1/km^{2}). The racial makeup of the city was 89.69% White, 6.76% African American, 0.28% Native American, 1.01% Asian, 0.05% Pacific Islander, 0.64% from other races, and 1.57% from two or more races. Hispanic or Latino of any race were 1.71% of the population.

There were 7,336 households, out of which 32.3% had children under the age of 18 living with them, 51.9% were married couples living together, 13.3% had a female householder with no husband present, and 31.3% were non-families. Of all households 27.3% were made up of individuals, and 11.8% had someone living alone who was 65 years of age or older. The average household size was 2.42 and the average family size was 2.94.

In the city, the population was spread out, with 25.4% under the age of 18, 8.6% from 18 to 24, 26.9% from 25 to 44, 23.0% from 45 to 64, and 16.1% who were 65 years of age or older. The median age was 38 years. For every 100 females, there were 90.5 males. For every 100 females age 18 and over, there were 85.6 males.

The median income for a household in the city was $34,119, and the median income for a family was $39,797. Males had a median income of $33,662 versus $20,962 for females. The per capita income for the city was $20,002. About 14.2% of families and 17.2% of the population were below the poverty line, including 25.0% of those under age 18 and 13.0% of those age 65 or over.

== Performing arts ==
The Annual 41A Music Festival hosts local music talent and national artists. South Jackson Civic Center hosts the South Jackson Civic Association, P.A.C.T. (Performing Arts for Children and Teens), and Community Playhouse, Inc. All three organizations produce multiple shows annually.

== Education ==
Tullahoma hosts two state institutions of higher learning, Motlow State Community College (located in Lynchburg-Moore County but has a Tullahoma address) and the University of Tennessee Space Institute.

K–12 public education is provided through a city school system. Tullahoma High School "Wildcat" athletic teams compete in the TSSAA in public school divisions. The Tullahoma Wildcat Football Team is currently in the 4A classification. They won the 2021 state championship over Elizabethton High School in triple overtime 21-14. while all other team sports compete in 3A.

== Transportation ==
The Tullahoma Regional Airport was originally constructed in 1942 for the U. S. Army Air Corps. It features wide heavy duty runways, a large ramp, taxiways and large hangars. Over 100 aircraft are presently based at the airport, with additional capacity available. Over 2,000 transient aircraft visit the airport annually.

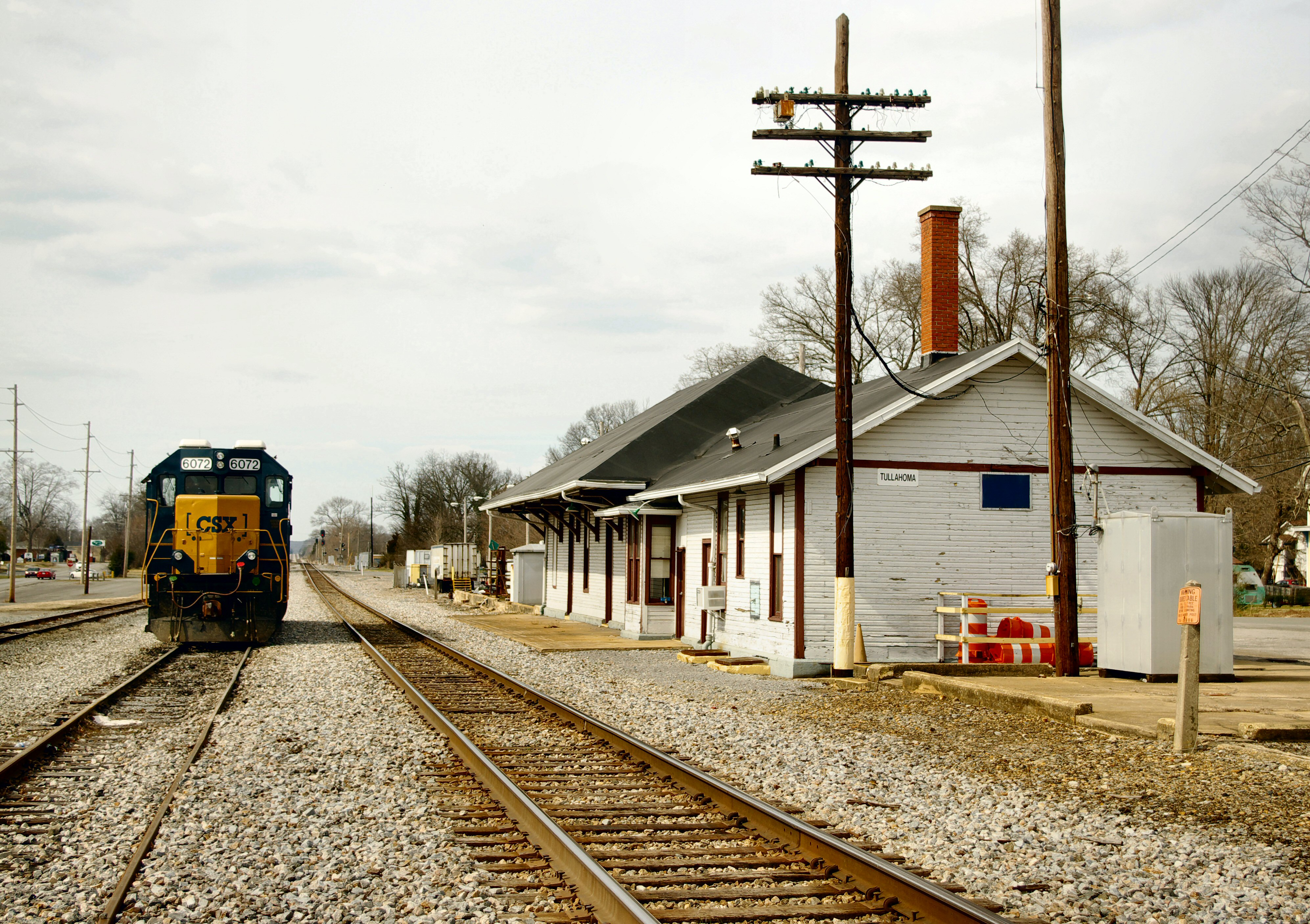
Tullahoma depot

The Tullahoma depot was a passenger train station for the Nashville, Chattanooga & St. Louis Railway and then the Louisville and Nashville Railroad through the 1960s. The Georgian (St. Louis & Chicago – Atlanta) all made stops at the station. The Georgian continued to 1968; however, the L&N maintained an unnamed Evansville – Nashville – Atlanta successor train until April 30, 1971, after which Amtrak absorbed L&N passenger operations. The Nashville to Atlanta route is being studied for reactivation as of February 2023.

Several state routes pass through Tullahoma, including, 16 (US 41A), 55, 130 and 269.

== Notable people ==
- Dewon Brazelton, baseball player, born in Tullahoma
- Eric Clutton, resided in Tullahoma; popularly known as Doctor Diesel, he designed aeromodels and the FRED experimental aircraft
- Billy Earheart, country keyboardist, born in Tullahoma
- Gary Flandro, NASA scientist and Boling Chair of Excellence in Space Propulsion for UTSI
- Isham G. Harris, politician and former Tennessee governor, born near Tullahoma
- David Hess, baseball player, born in Tullahoma
- Little Richard, rock and roll pioneer, died in Tullahoma
- Antonio London, football player, born in Tullahoma
- Dustin Lynch, country singer, born in Tullahoma
- Steve Matthews, football player, born in Tullahoma
- Dave B. Mitchell, voice actor, born in Tullahoma
- Bryan Morris, baseball player, born in Tullahoma
- Jordan Sheffield, baseball player, born in Tullahoma
- Justus Sheffield, baseball player, born in Tullahoma
- Jimmy Valiant, professional wrestler, born near Tullahoma
- Ally Walker, actress, born in Tullahoma
- Thomas A. Wiseman, judge and politician, born in Tullahoma
