= S700 =

S700 may refer to:

- Fujifilm FinePix S700, a camera
- S700, a Nikon Coolpix series camera
- Sony Cyber-shot DSC-S700, a camera
- S700, a Sony Ericsson mobile phone
- S700, a Sony Walkman S Series digital audio player
- S700, several Yamaha Corporation products
- SIAI-Marchetti S.700 Cormorano, an Italian amphibian aircraft proposal
- Siemens S700 and S70 light rail vehicle
