= Death of Christopher Cramer =

Christopher Cramer was an American contractor for a US subsidiary of the Israel firm Elbit Systems who died in Saudi Arabia on January 15, 2015. His body was found underneath the balcony of his hotel. Saudi officials have said the death was a suicide but his family and employer have alleged foul play.

== Trip to Saudi Arabia ==
Cramer was in Saudi Arabia to give technical support for a thermal sight system for American-manufactured TOW missiles. A spokesman for Elbit said their subsidiary was able to sell the weapons to the Saudis (Israeli companies are usually restricted) because "It was a legacy system of Kollsman's, an American product that had no components involving Israeli technology."

The Daily Beast reported that his co-worker suspected that the Saudi contractor they were working with was sabotaging military equipment. Elbit's General Counsel claimed that he had "never heard any basis for that whatsoever.

Text messages from Cramer to his nephew said they were going to try the system with "new tow 2A RF link aeros and some extended range tow" and might "get an order for a ton of upgrades."

== Autopsy ==
Cramer's family hired a retired medical examiner from the New York State Police to perform an autopsy. The medical examiner concluded that the death was a homicide. There were evidence of fractures inconsistent with a simple fall and the medical examiner suspected he may have been severely beaten or pushed from the balcony.

The medical examiner report lists the cause of death as "multiple blunt force injuries of the head, chest, back, and extremities." The Saudi autopsy says "multiple traumatic injuries on body led to fractures of the skull and brain, hemorrhage and shock. Fall from height." According to the medical examiner, "My interpretation is that he [Cramer] could not have fallen accidentally. If you accidentally fall, there would only be injuries on the side of impact."

The story was first reported by Fox News.

== US Congress ==
Based on the autopsy results members of Congress called for the US State Department to conduct an investigation. The State Department said they were not able to investigate without the permission of the host government.
