= Dust jacket =

Paper wrapper for a book

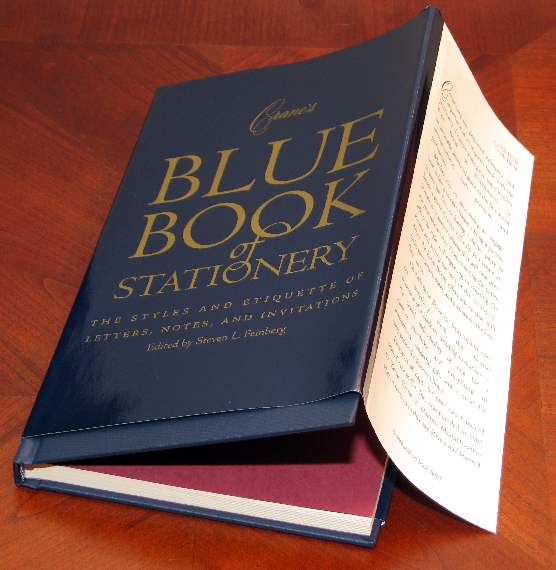
A dust jacket, propped up and partially unfolded for illustration

The dust jacket (sometimes book jacket, dust wrapper or dust cover) of a book is the detachable outer cover, usually made of paper and printed with text and illustrations. This outer cover has folded flaps that hold it to the front and back book covers; these flaps may also double as bookmarks.

Dust jackets originally displayed cover information on top of a simple binding, at a time when it was not feasible to print directly onto the binding. The role of a dust jacket has been largely supplanted by modern hardcover printing technologies, which print such information directly onto the binding.

Modern dust covers still serve to display promotional material and shield the book from damage. The back panel or flaps of the dust cover are printed with biographical information about the author, a summary of the book from the publisher (known as a blurb) or critical praise from celebrities or authorities in the book's subject area. The back of a dust jacket often has a barcode for retail purchase, and the book's ISBN. The information on the dust jacket often resembles that of the binding but may have additional promotions about an edition, and the information on the flaps is not typically copied onto the binding.

The dust jacket protects the book covers from damage. However, since it is itself relatively fragile, and since dust jackets have practical, aesthetic, and sometimes financial value, the jacket may in turn be wrapped in another jacket, usually transparent, especially if the book is a library volume.

== Early history ==
Before the 1820s, most books were published unbound and were generally sold to customers either in this form, or in simple bindings executed for the bookseller, or in bespoke bindings commissioned by the customer. At this date, publishers did not have their books bound in uniform "house" bindings, so there was no reason for them to issue dust jackets. Book owners did occasionally fashion their own jackets out of leather, wallpaper, fur, or other material, and many other types of detachable protective covers were made for codices, manuscripts, and scrolls from ancient times through the Middle Ages and into the modern period.

At the end of the 18th century, publishers began to issue books in plain paper-covered boards, sometimes with a printed spine label; this form of binding was intended to be temporary. Some collections of loose prints were issued at this period in printed paper wrappings, again intended to be temporary. In the first two decades of the nineteenth century, publishers started issuing some smaller books in bindings of printed paper-covered boards, and throughout the 1820s and 1830s some small popular books, notably annual gift books and almanacs, were issued in detachable printed pasteboard sheaths. These small boxes are sometimes loosely and erroneously referred to as the first dust jackets. True publisher's bindings in cloth and leather, in which all, or a substantial part of, an edition were bound, were also introduced shortly before 1820, by the innovative publisher William Pickering.

=== Oldest dust jackets ===
After publishers' cloth bindings started coming into common use on all types of books in the 1820s, the first publishers' dust jackets appeared by the end of that decade. The earliest known examples were issued on English literary annuals which were popular from the 1820s to the 1850s. These books often had fancy bindings that needed protection. The jackets that were used at this time completely enclosed the books like wrapping paper and were sealed shut with wax or glue.

The oldest publishers' dust jacket now on record was issued in 1829 on an English annual, Friendship's Offering for 1830. It was discovered at the Bodleian Library in Oxford by Michael Turner, a former curator and Head of Conservation at the Library. Its existence was announced by Oxford in 2009. It is three years older than the previous oldest known jacket, which was discovered in 1934 by the English bookman John Carter on another English annual, The Keepsake for 1833 (issued in 1832). Unlike modern dust jacket's, the 1829 jacket completely enclosed the book rather than leaving the binding exposed. It was sealed with wax or glue, making it closer to a protective wrapping than to the reusable flap-style jackets that later became standard. Both jackets are of the type that completely enclosed the books.

Most jackets of this type were torn when they were opened and then discarded like gift-wrapping paper; they were not designed to be reused, and surviving examples are known on only a handful of titles. The scarcity of jackets of this type, together with the lack of written documentation from publishers of the period, makes it very hard to determine how widely these all-enclosing jackets were used during the period from 1820 to 1850, but they were likely common on ornately bound annuals and on some trade books.

The earliest known dust jackets of the modern style, with flaps, which covered just the binding and left the text block exposed, date from the 1850s, although this type of jacket was likely in at least limited use some years earlier. This is the jacket that became standard in the publishing industry and is still in use today. It is believed that flap-style jackets were in general use by the 1880s, and probably earlier, although the number of surviving examples from the 1850s, 1860s, and 1870s is too small to prove exactly when they became ubiquitous, and again, there are no known publishers' records that document the use of dust jackets during these decades. There are, however, enough surviving examples from the 1890s to state unequivocally that dust jackets were all but universal throughout that decade. They were probably issued more often than not by the 1860s and 1870s in Europe, Great Britain, and the United States.

== Late 19th and early 20th centuries ==
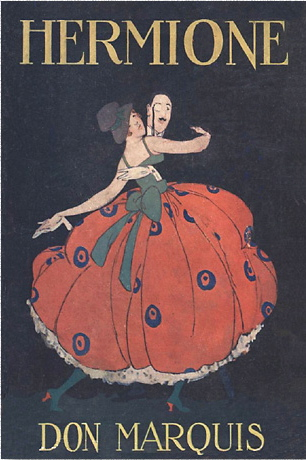
Front dust jacket art by Thelma Cudlipp for Don Marquis' Hermione and Her Little Group of Serious Thinkers, 1916.

Throughout the nineteenth century, nearly all dust jackets were discarded at or soon after purchase. Many were discarded in bookstores as the books were put out for display, or when they were sold; there is evidence that this was common practice in England until World War I. The period from the 1820s to 1900 was a golden age for publishers' decorative bookbinding, and most dust jackets were much plainer than the books they covered, often simply repeating the main elements of the binding decoration in black on cream or brown paper. For this reason, most people preferred to display their books in their bindings, much as earlier generations had displayed their library books in their gold-tooled individual bindings, usually in leather or vellum. Even late in the nineteenth century there were still some publishers who were not using dust jackets at all (the English publisher Methuen is one example). Some firms, such as subscription houses which sold millions of cheap books door-to-door, probably never used them.

Cloth dust jackets became popular late in the nineteenth century. These jackets, with the outer cloth usually reinforced with an underlayer of paper, were issued mostly on ornate gift editions, often in two volumes and often with a slipcase. Other types of publishers' boxes were also popular in the second half of the nineteenth century, including many made to hold multi-volume sets of books. The jackets on boxed volumes were often plain, sometimes with cutouts on the spine to allow the title or volume numbers of the books to be seen.

After 1900, fashion and the economics of publishing caused book bindings to become less decorative, and it was cheaper for publishers to make the jackets more attractive. By around 1920, most of the artwork and decoration had migrated from the binding to the dust jacket, and jackets were routinely printed with multiple colors, extensive advertising and blurbs; even the underside of the jacket was now sometimes used for advertising.

As dust jackets became more attractive than the bindings, more people began to keep the jackets on their books, at least until they became soiled, torn, or worn out. One bit of evidence that indicates when jackets became saved objects is the movement of the printed price from the spine of the jacket to a corner of one of the flaps. This also occurred in the 1910s and early 1920s. When jackets were routinely discarded at point of purchase, it did not matter where the price was printed (and many early jackets were not printed with any price), but now if book buyers of the 1910s and 1920s wanted to save the jacket and give a book as a gift, they could clip off the price without ruining the jacket.

In 1939, Arthur Brody, a student at Columbia University, invented a film-based jacket, which is used by libraries to protect paper dust jackets.

=== Supplementary bands ===
In Japan, both hardcover and softcover books frequently come with two dust jackets – a full-sized one, serving the same purpose as in the West (it is usually retained with the book), and a thin "obi" ("belt"; colloquially "belly band" in English), which is generally disposed of and serves a similar function to 19th-century Western dust jackets.

Similar bands occasionally appear in the west, for example in Palookaville #20.

== As collectible items ==
Dust jackets from the 1920s and later were often decorated in art deco styles which are highly prized by collectors. Some of them are worth far more than the books they cover. The most famous example is the jacket on the first edition of The Great Gatsby by F. Scott Fitzgerald, published in 1925. The jacket's celebrated "Celestial Eyes" artwork was painted by Francis Cygar, and is regarded as one of the most famous dust jacket designs in American literature. Without jacket, the book brings $1,000 or so. With the jacket it can bring $20,000 or $30,000 or more, depending on condition. One copy in a near mint jacket was listed for sale in 2009 for half a million dollars. The most valuable jackets are usually those on the high spots of literature. Condition is of paramount importance to value. Other examples of highly prized jackets include those on most of Ernest Hemingway's titles, and the first editions of books such as Harper Lee's To Kill A Mockingbird, J. D. Salinger's Catcher in the Rye and Dashiell Hammett's The Maltese Falcon, among many others. Prices for dust jackets have become so inflated in recent years that even early reprints of certain titles in jacket can command good prices. Conversely, if the book itself is unimportant, or at least has little demand, the jacket is usually of little value either, but nearly all surviving pre-1920 jackets add some additional value to the book they cover.

Some collectors and dealers, in an effort to increase the value of a first edition that has lost its original jacket, will take a jacket from a later printing and "marry" it to the earlier one. This practice persists because some customers will pay more for a first edition in a later jacket than they would for a jacketless copy. However, switching jackets muddles the bibliographical record and creates a forgery of sorts.

== See also ==
- Book collecting
- Book design
- Obi (publishing)
