= George Vitale =

American taekwondo practitioner

George Vitale is a Taekwon-Do Grand Master (9th degree blackbelt) and was assigned to the New York State Police security detail in New York City for both New York State Governors George Pataki and Governor Mario Cuomo. He later rose to head a Unit of Troopers in the NYC Executive Chambers of the Governor. He was inducted into the official Tae Kwon Do Hall of Fame (Lifetime Achievement Award). He successfully navigated the politics of North Korea, South Korea, and the United States, to bring the historic first group of North Koreans to tour the United States, in an exhibition of the original Taekwon-Do by members of the ITF from the North Korean Taekwon-Do Committee. The efforts he continued emanate from the work of General CHOI Hong-Hi, the acknowledged principal founder by the Encyclopædia Britannica, of the first style or system to be called Taekwon-Do. This work continues under the careful attention of Grandmaster JUNG Woo-Jin, the last of only 7 people to be promoted to the terminal 9th degree in Taekwon-Do by the ITF under General CHOI. The latest results can be seen from the success of the 2018 Winter Olympics, called The Peace Olympics by His Excellency MOON Jae-In of the Republic of Korea. The efforts continue under the ITF and WT, with a Taekwondo Team from South Korea visiting Pyongyang in April 2018, along with a large musical group. The Taekwon-Do Diplomacy of General CHOI, continues to be at the forefront of long time efforts of reconciliation of the Koreas, with a hope to an eventual peaceful reunification, as indicated by the ITF highest or final Pattern, (Tul), created by General CHOI which he named TONG-IL, which is interpreted as reunification. He came to national attention as a New York State Trooper during the World Trade Center attacks on 9-11. In 2009, he was Inducted into the Official Taekwondo Hall of Fame (Lifetime Achievement Award). Grand Master George Vitale earned his academic Doctorate Degree in Physical Education/Sports Science in Taekwon-do Studies, with the focus on History, in 2011 in North Korea, becoming the first and only American to receive a PhD and achieve this distinction.

== Publications ==
- Volume 16 (Encyclopedia of Taekwon-Do): Supplemental Volume to the Encyclopedia of Taekwon-Do, Createspace Independent Publishing Platform, Foreword, ISBN 1535566469.
- Johnson, John A.; Vitale, George (2018). "Taekwondo diplomacy: new possibilities for peace on the Korean Peninsula". Physical Activity Review. 6. doi:10.16926/par.2018.06.28.
