= Edwin Grosvenor =

Edwin Grosvenor may refer to:

- Edwin A. Grosvenor (1845–1936), historian and author
- Edwin S. Grosvenor (born 1951), writer and the editor-in-chief of American Heritage magazine
