= Governor Whitman =

Governor Whitman may refer to:

- Charles Seymour Whitman (1868–1947), 41st Governor of New York
- Christine Todd Whitman (born September 26, 1946), 50th Governor of New Jersey
