= Vulcanair V1.0 =

Italian light aircraft

V1.0
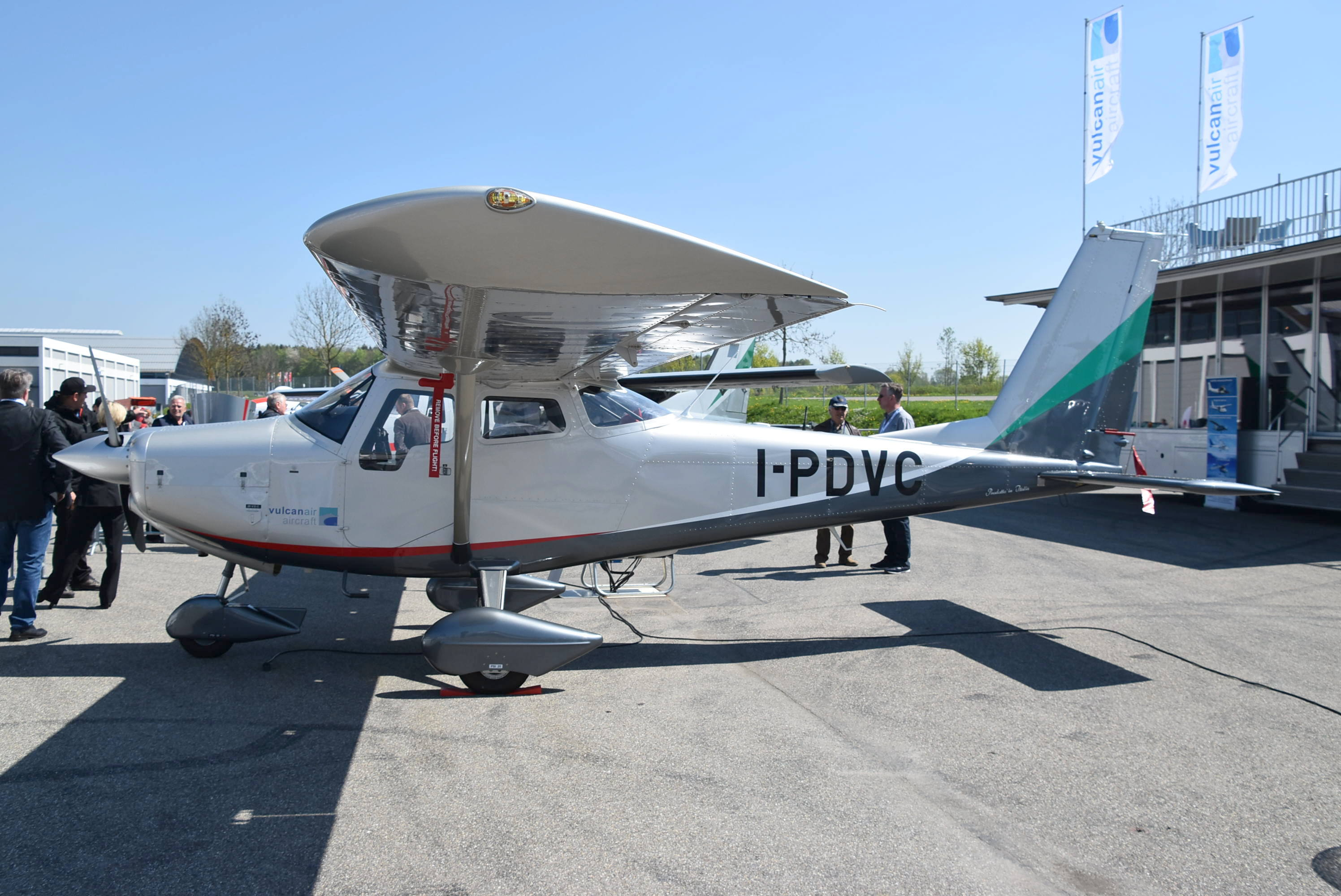

General information
- Type: Light aircraft
- National origin: Italy
- Manufacturer: Vulcanair
- Status: In production (2017)

History
- Introduction date: 2014
- Developed from: Partenavia P.64B Oscar

The Vulcanair V1.0 is an Italian light aircraft, designed and produced by Vulcanair of Casoria, introduced at the AERO Friedrichshafen show in 2014. The aircraft is type certified by the European Aviation Safety Agency and the US Federal Aviation Administration and is supplied complete and ready-to-fly.

The design is a derivation of the Partenavia P.64B Oscar.

== Design and development ==
The V1.0 features a strut-braced rectangular planform high-wing, a four-seat enclosed cabin accessed by two front doors and one rear seat door on the right side, fixed tricycle landing gear with wheel pants and a single engine in tractor configuration.

The aircraft forward fuselage is made from welded steel tubing, with the balance of the airframe of sheet aluminum construction. Its 10.0 m (32.8 ft) span wing employs flaps. The standard engine used is the 180 hp (134 kW) Lycoming IO-360-M1A four-stroke fuel-injected powerplant.

The design greatly resembles the Cessna 172 and is intended to compete with that aircraft in performance and price. In July 2017, the company announced an equipped price with a Garmin G500 avionics suite of US$259,000, to undercut the price of a new Cessna 172.

European Aviation Safety Agency certification was completed in November 2013 and the US Federal Aviation Administration certification in December 2017.

== Operators ==
=== Orders ===
- Delaware State University - 10 ordered in November 2018

== Specifications (V1.0) ==
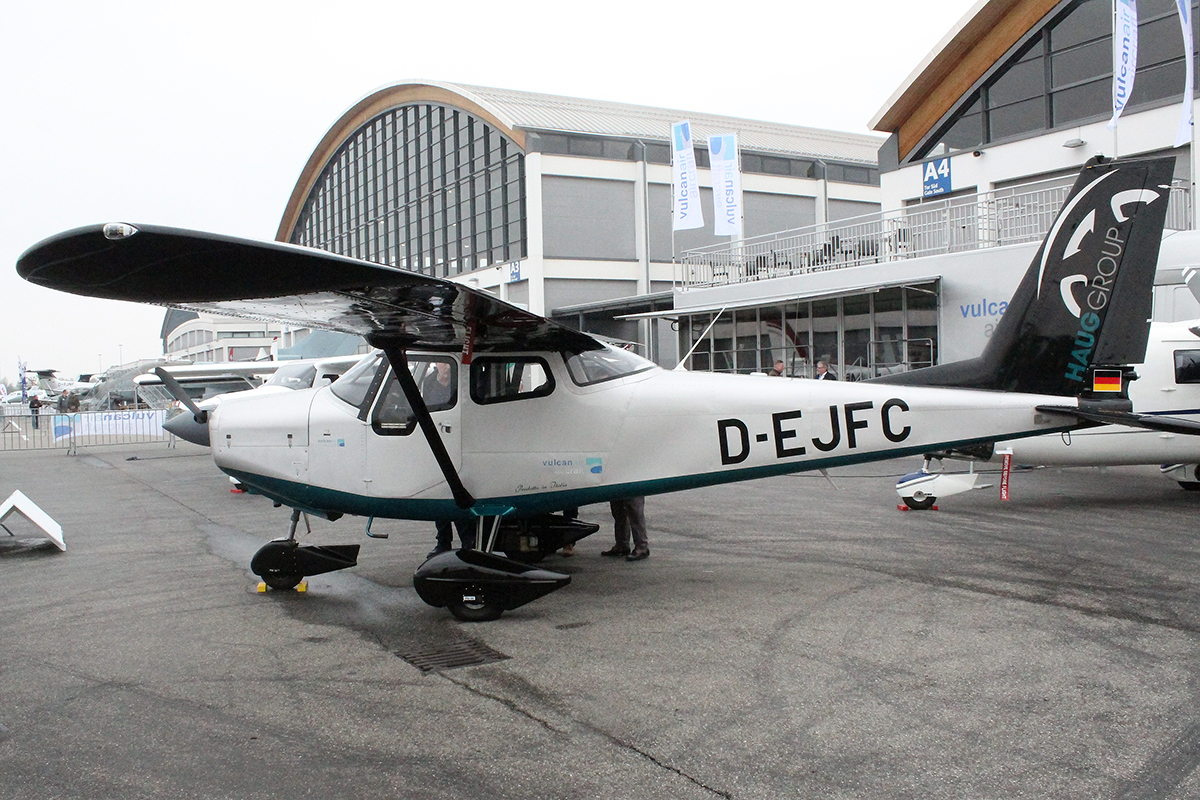
Vulcanair V1.0

Data from Tacke and manufacturer

General characteristics

- Crew: one
- Capacity: three passengers
- Length: 7.23 m (23 ft 9 in)
- Wingspan: 9.985 m (32 ft 9 in)
- Height: 2.77 m (9 ft 1 in)
- Wing area: 13.40 m^{2} (144.2 sq ft)
- Aspect ratio: 7.4:1
- Empty weight: 738 kg (1,627 lb) typical equipped
- Gross weight: 1,155 kg (2,546 lb)
- Fuel capacity: 190 litres (42 imp gal; 50 US gal)
- Powerplant: 1 × Lycoming IO-360-M1A four cylinder, air-cooled, four stroke aircraft engine, 130 kW (180 hp)
- Propellers: 2-bladed fixed pitch or constant speed propeller, 1.88 m (6 ft 2 in) diameter

Performance

- Maximum speed: 257 km/h (160 mph, 139 kn)
- Cruise speed: 241 km/h (150 mph, 130 kn) at 75% power, 6000 ft
- Stall speed: 95 km/h (59 mph, 51 kn) (flaps down)
- Never exceed speed: 311 km/h (193 mph, 168 kn)
- Range: 1,094 km (680 mi, 591 nmi) with three occupants of 77 kg each, 45-min reserve, 45% power, 10,000 ft
- Service ceiling: 4,500 m (14,800 ft)
- Rate of climb: 4.5 m/s (890 ft/min)
