= George Fletcher Chandler =

American physician

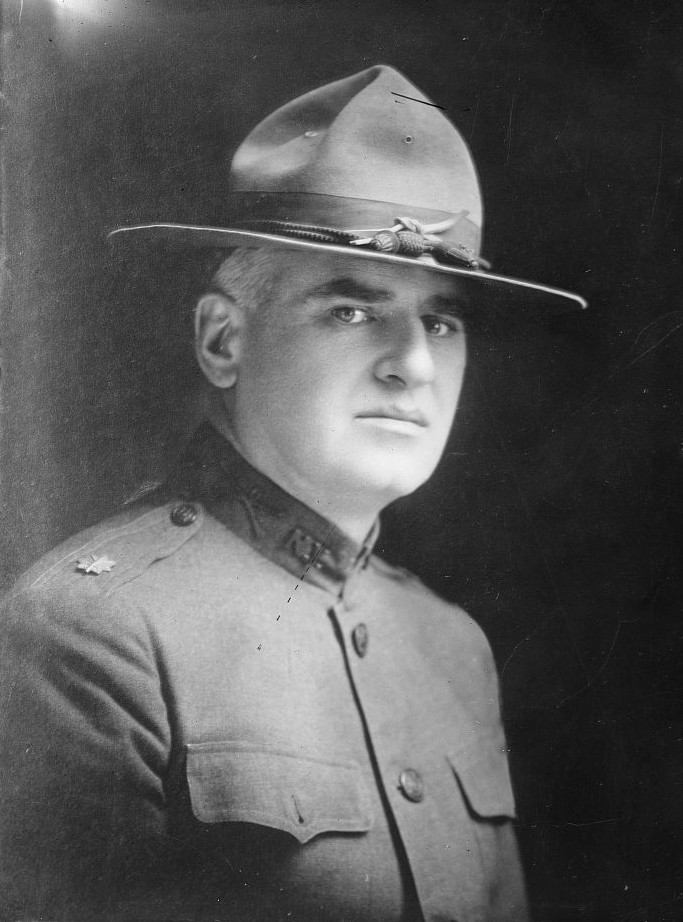

Superintendent of the New York State Police
- In office May 1, 1917 – December 1, 1923
- Governor: Charles S. Whitman
- Preceded by: Inaugural holder
- Succeeded by: James Adams Warner

Personal details
- Born: George Fletcher; December 13, 1872 Clyde, New York, U.S.
- Died: November 6, 1964 (aged 91) Kingston, New York, U.S.
- Spouse: Martha Marie Schultze (1900–1931) (her death)
- Education: Syracuse University; Columbia University (M.D.)

Military service
- Allegiance: United States
- Branch/service: United States Army; New York National Guard
- Unit: Army Medical Corps

George Fletcher Chandler (December 13, 1872 – November 6, 1964) was an American surgeon, military officer and police administrator. He was appointed by the governor to organize the New York State Police, newly authorized in 1917, and served as its first superintendent from 1917 to 1923.

== Early life, education and career ==
Chandler was born in Clyde, New York to a Methodist minister and his wife. He lived with his family in Lockport, New York and Portland, Oregon. He graduated from Ithaca High School in Ithaca, New York. He earned a bachelor's degree at Syracuse University in 1892 and a medical degree at Columbia University College of Physicians and Surgeons in 1895.

After setting up his practice and beginning work as a physician, Chandler befriended Charles S. Whitman, a fellow young professional with whom he shared a rooming house. They later worked together after Whitman went into politics and was elected as governor of the state.

Chandler studied the violin and was considered to have some talent. In 1900, he married Martha Marie Shultze, the daughter of the founder of Syracuse University's School of Music. They had two sons, Daniel and Fehmer, before her death in 1931.

== Military and police career ==
Chandler enlisted in the New York National Guard as a lieutenant. By 1916, he had been promoted to the rank of major.

Chandler served with the National Guard in 1917, when his unit was called up to respond to an invasion on the southern border with Mexico related to forces in its civil war. Shortly after returning to the state from the Pancho Villa Expedition, Chandler was tapped by his friend and New York Governor Charles S. Whitman to head and organize the New York State Police. Chandler initially declined as he hoped to fight with US forces in the Great War in Europe. At the time, former president Theodore Roosevelt was raising a division to join the war effort.

After Roosevelt promised Chandler that he would request him for his division, he accepted the state post. But Roosevelt failed a physical examination, as he was older than most officers, and the United States government declined to accept the Roosevelt division for duty.

Following the collapse of the arrangement with Roosevelt, Chandler proceeded to work on establishing a state police force. He visited and studied the Pennsylvania State Police and the Canadian Royal North-West Mounted Police in Ottawa.

Uncomfortable with the political pressures of his position, Chandler later resigned. In late 1918, he left New York to serve with the U.S. Army Medical Corps at Fort Oglethorpe in Georgia. He returned to his post as Superintendent in 1919, following Governor Whitman's refusal to accept his resignation.

As Superintendent, Chandler was involved at every level of the state police and his influence on the organization was long-lasting. He recruited his first troops by attracting men from the New York National Guard.

Chandler coined the term "New York State Trooper." Contrary to the norms of the time, he required that troopers carry their weapons exposed on the outside of their uniforms. More positively, he instituted rigorous processes for screening, training, and education of the force. Chandler also established the New York State School for Police, which emphasized legal training. This became a standard for police forces in the United States.

== Retirement ==
On December 1, 1923, Chandler retired from the state police. He established a surgical practice in Kingston, New York.

He also served on New York's State Crime Commission in the governments of Alfred E. Smith and Franklin Delano Roosevelt. He died in 1964 at the age of 91.
