= Vulcanair Canguro =

SF.600 Canguro
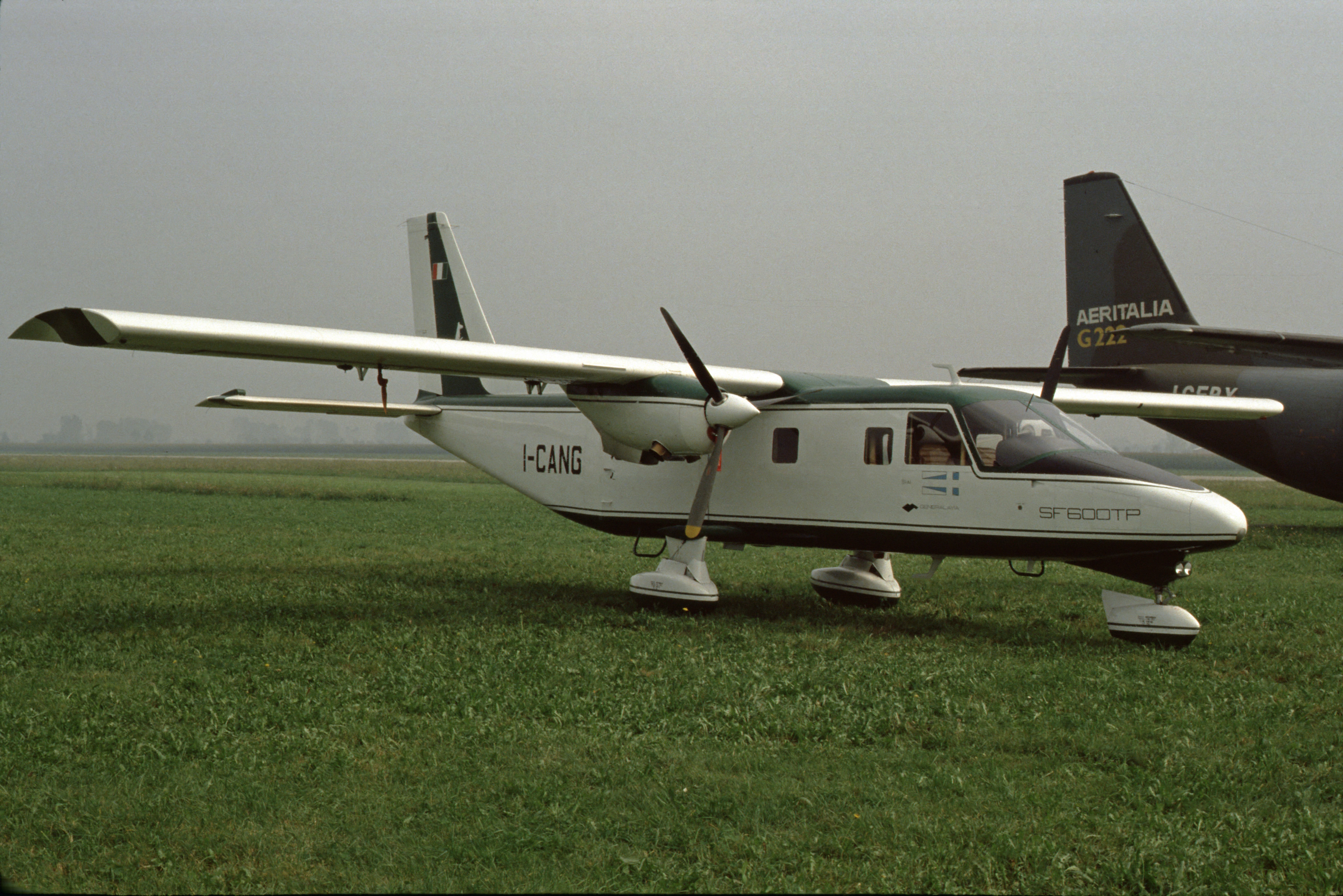
- Prototype SF 600

General information
- Type: Feederliner
- National origin: Italy
- Manufacturer: General Avia, SIAI Marchetti, Vulcanair
- Designer: Stelio Frati
- Number built: ca. 10

History
- First flight: 30 December 1978
- Variant: S.700 Cormorano

The Vulcanair SF.600 Canguro (en: "Kangaroo") was a feederliner developed in Italy in the late 1970s. Despite a number of attempts to put the aircraft into series production, only a small number were ever built.

== Design and development ==
The Canguro was a high-wing cantilever monoplane of conventional configuration with a fuselage of rectangular cross-section and a high-set tail. The tricycle undercarriage was not retractable, and its main units were carried on sponsons on the fuselage sides. SIAI Marchetti provided funding towards the construction of the prototype, and constructed this aircraft at the former Aviamilano plant. After flight testing proved positive, the type was put on sale, but failed to attract buyers in any number, even when the original piston engines were exchanged for turboprops and retractable undercarriage was offered as an option.

Following their acquisition of SIAI Marchetti, Agusta continued to offer the design, and a contract for joint production was signed with Sammi in South Korea in 1992, but nothing came of this. A similar venture to produce the aircraft in conjunction with PADC in the Philippines proved similarly fruitless. PADC acquired two aircraft, RP-C1298 and RP-3101. In 1997, Vulcanair purchased the design from Finmeccanica (Agusta's parent company), but although a small number of examples were produced, no series production was undertaken. Vulcanair next proceeded to use the Canguro's fuselage to develop the single-engine Vulcanair Mission.

== Variants ==
SF600
1982-variant with two Allison 250-B17C turboprop engines.
SF600A
1989-variant with increased mean take-off weight, two Allison 250-B17F/1 turboprop engines, modification to the wing aerodynamics and modifications to the landing gear support structure.

== Operators ==
Philippines
Philippine Coast Guard: Retired
- 1 for search and rescue missions.

== Specifications (SF.600TP) ==
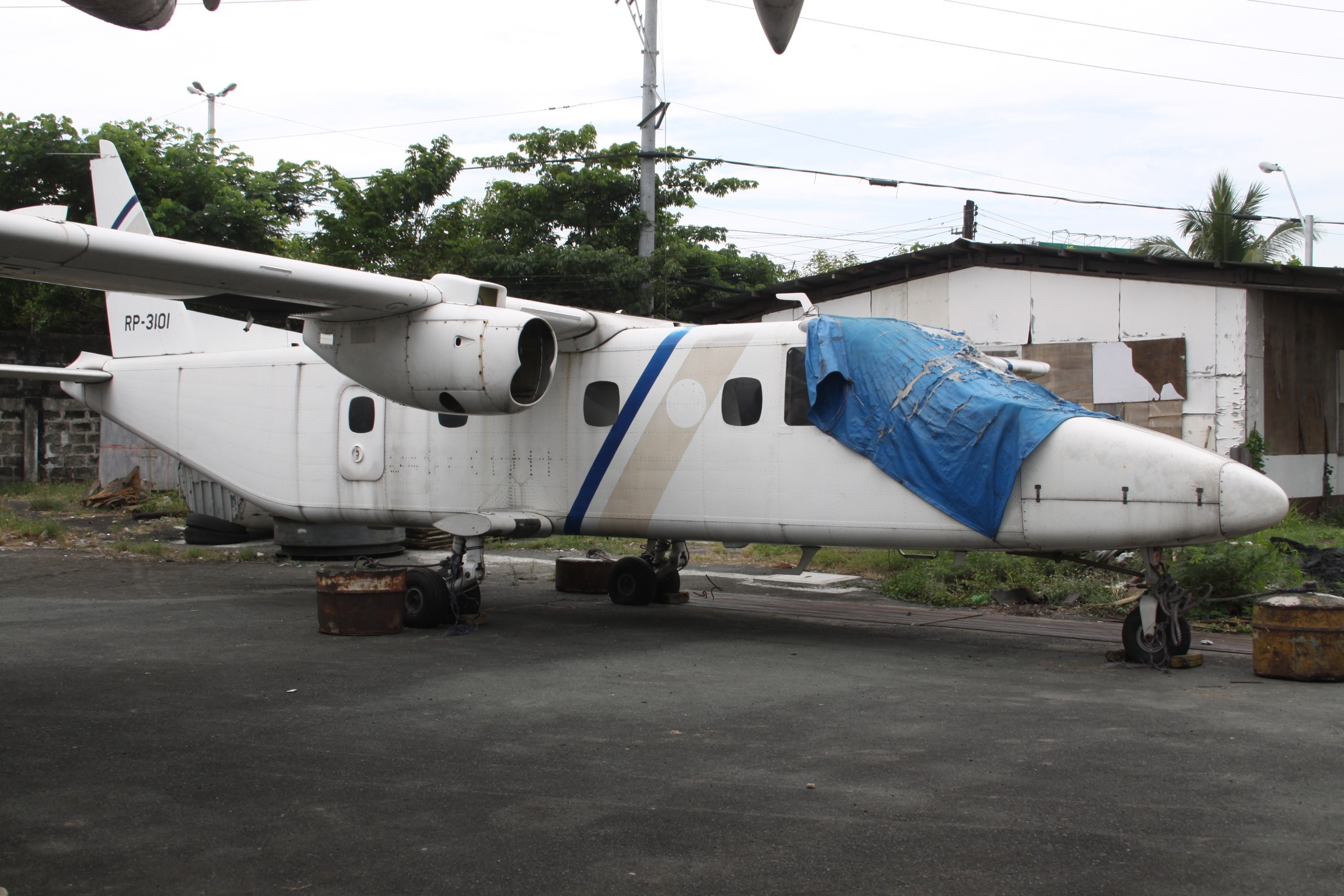
A former Philippine Coast Guard SF.600 at Manila Ninoy Aquino International

Data from Jane's All The World's Aircraft 1988–89

General characteristics

- Crew: 2
- Capacity: 9 passengers
- Length: 12.15 m (39 ft 10 in)
- Wingspan: 15.00 m (49 ft 3 in)
- Height: 4.60 m (15 ft 1 in)
- Wing area: 24.0 m^{2} (258 sq ft)
- Airfoil: NASA GA(W)-1
- Empty weight: 1,875 kg (4,134 lb)
- Max takeoff weight: 3,400 kg (7,496 lb)
- Fuel capacity: 1,100 L (290 US gal; 240 imp gal) internals; 1,700 L (450 US gal; 370 imp gal) with underwing tanks
- Oil capacity: 11.4 L (3.0 US gal; 2.5 imp gal)
- Powerplant: 2 × Allison Model 250-B17C turboprop, 313 kW (420 hp) each
- Propellers: 3-bladed Hartzell constant speed fully reversible propellers

Performance

- Cruise speed: 306 km/h (190 mph, 165 kn) maximum at 1,525 m (5,000 ft), Max TO weight and ISA
- Economical cruising speed: 287 km/h (178 mph; 155 kn) at 75% power at 3,050 m (10,000 ft)
- Stall speed: 109 km/h (68 mph, 59 kn)
- Range: 600 km (370 mi, 320 nmi) with max payload at 3,050 m (10,000 ft) with 10% reserves

1,580 km (980 mi) with max fuel and 500 kg (1,100 lb) payload at 3,050 m (10,000 ft) with 10% reserves

- Service ceiling: 7,315 m (24,000 ft)
- Service ceiling one engine out: 3,050 m (10,000 ft)
- Rate of climb: 7.5 m/s (1,480 ft/min) maximum
- Wing loading: 141.7 kg/m^{2} (29.0 lb/sq ft)
- Power/mass: 5.43 kg/kW (8.93 lb/hp)
- Take-off run: 287 m (942 ft)
- Landing run: 280 m (920 ft) without propeller reversal; 204 m (670 ft) with propeller reversal
- Take-off run to 15 m (49 ft): 408 m (1,340 ft)
- Landing run from 15 m (49 ft): 479 m (1,572 ft) without propeller reversal; 396 m (1,300 ft) with propeller reversal
