= 1918 New York gubernatorial election =

- November 5, 1918
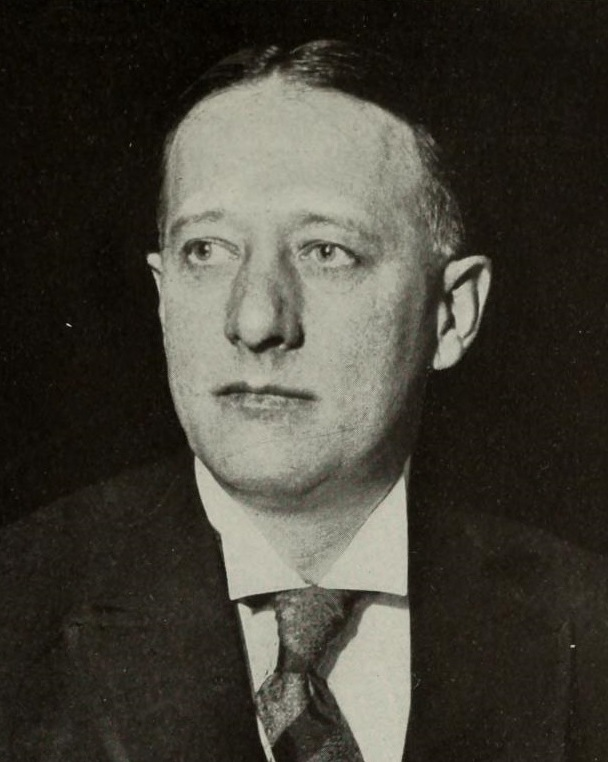

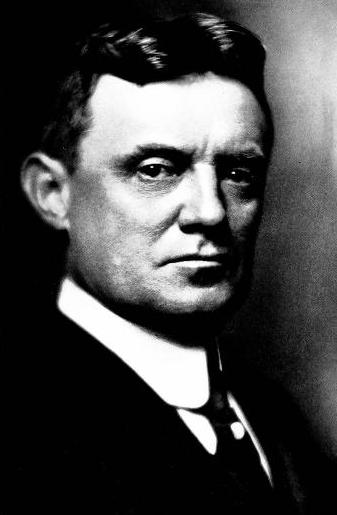

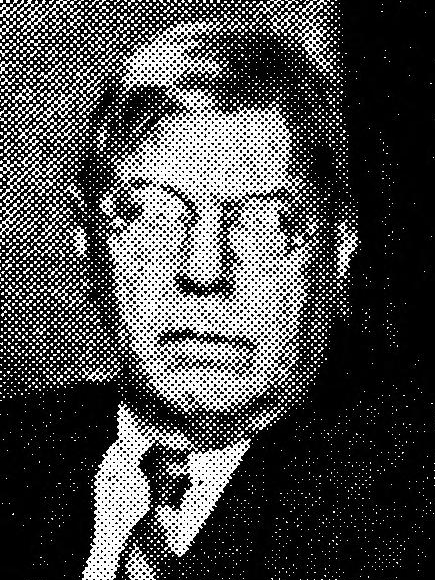
Nominee	Al Smith	Charles S. Whitman	Charles W. Ervin
Party	Democratic	Republican	Socialist
Popular vote	1,009,936	995,094	121,705
Percentage	47.36%	46.66%	5.71%
- County results Smith: 40–50% 50–60% 60–70% 70–80% Whitman: 50–60% 60–70% 70–80%
Governor before election
Charles S. Whitman
Republican
Elected Governor
Al Smith
Democratic

The 1918 New York gubernatorial election took place on November 5, 1918, to elect the Governor and Lieutenant Governor of New York, concurrently with elections to the United States Senate in other states and elections to the United States House of Representatives and various state and local elections.

Al Smith, president of the New York City aldermen, was elected to the first of his four two-year terms as governor.

== Republican primary ==
=== Candidates ===
- Charles S. Whitman, incumbent governor
- Merton E. Lewis, incumbent attorney general

=== Results ===
New York gubernatorial Republican primary, 1918
Party	Candidate	Votes	%
Republican	Charles S. Whitman (incumbent)	295,471	71.31%
Republican	Merton E. Lewis	118,879	28.69%
Total votes		414,350	100%

== Democratic primary ==
=== Candidates ===
- William C. Osborn, former chair of the New York Democratic Party
- Al Smith, President of the New York City Board of Aldermen

==== Declined ====
- Franklin D. Roosevelt, Assistant Secretary of the Navy

=== Campaign ===
Following his failed candidacy for U.S. Senate in 1914, Franklin D. Roosevelt reconciled with Tammany Hall. He delivered the keynote address at the society's 1917 Fourth of July celebration, and Tammany stalwarts John M. Riehle, William Kelley, Thomas J. McManus, and up-and-comer Jimmy Walker endorsed him as a potential candidate for governor in 1918. President Woodrow Wilson also privately urged Roosevelt to consider a campaign. However, he refused, believing that the ongoing Great War would continue through the election and that 1918 would be a Republican year.

Roosevelt instead endorsed William Church Osborn, though he would later claim to have engineered Smith's nomination himself.

=== Results ===
New York gubernatorial Democratic primary, 1918
Party	Candidate	Votes	%
Democratic	Al Smith	199,752	85.91%
Democratic	William C. Osborn	32,761	14.09%
Total votes		232,513	100%

== General election ==
=== Candidates ===
- Charles W. Ervin (Socialist)
- Olive M. Johnson, newspaper editor and political activist (Socialist Labor)
- Al Smith, President of the New York City Board of Aldermen (Democratic)
- Charles S. Whitman, incumbent governor (Republican)

=== Results ===
1918 New York gubernatorial election
Party	Candidate	Votes	%	±%
Democratic	Al Smith	1,009,936	47.36%	
Republican	Charles S. Whitman (incumbent)	995,094	46.66%	
Socialist	Charles W. Ervin	121,705	5.71%	
Socialist Labor	Olive M. Johnson	5,183	0.24%	
Write-in	All others	530	0.02%	
Total votes		2,132,448	100.00%	
