= Partenavia Tornado =

1950s Italian high-performance competition and touring monoplane

P.55 Tornado

General information
- Type: High-performance competition monoplane
- National origin: Italy
- Manufacturer: Partenavia
- Number built: 1

History
- First flight: 1955
- Retired: 1958

The Partenavia P.55 Tornado was a 1950s Italian high-performance competition and touring monoplane built by Partenavia. The Tornado was a small mid-wing cantilever monoplane with a retractable tricycle landing gear. The aircraft was powered by a nose-mounted Lycoming O-320 piston engine.

The aircraft was commissioned to win the Tour of Sicily (it: Giro di Sicilia), and the Tornado won the race in 1956. Although the aircraft had won the race it was too specialised design to enter production and only one aircraft (registered I-REGJ) was built. I-REGJ was destroyed in a crash on 13 June 1958.

== Specifications ==
Data from Jane's All the World' Aircraft 1956–57

General characteristics

- Crew: 2
- Length: 6.00 m (19 ft 8 in)
- Wingspan: 7.20 m (23 ft 7 in)
- Height: 1.80 m (5 ft 11 in)
- Wing area: 8.00 m^{2} (86.1 sq ft)
- Aspect ratio: 6.5
- Empty weight: 480 kg (1,058 lb)
- Gross weight: 710 kg (1,565 lb)
- Fuel capacity: 120 L (32 US gal; 26 imp gal)
- Powerplant: 1 × Lycoming O-320 4-cylinder air-cooled horizontally-opposed piston engine, 110 kW (150 hp)
- Propellers: 2-bladed fixed-pitch propeller

Performance

- Maximum speed: 347 km/h (216 mph, 187 kn)
- Cruise speed: 303 km/h (188 mph, 164 kn)
- Stall speed: 95 km/h (59 mph, 51 kn)
- Range: 950 km (590 mi, 510 nmi)
- Service ceiling: 6,000 m (20,000 ft)
- Time to altitude: 1,000 m (3,300 ft) in 3 minutes
- Wing loading: 88.8 kg/m^{2} (18.2 lb/sq ft)
- Power/mass: 0.21 kW/kg (0.13 hp/lb)
