= Vulcanair Mission =

Italian utility aircraft

VF600W Mission
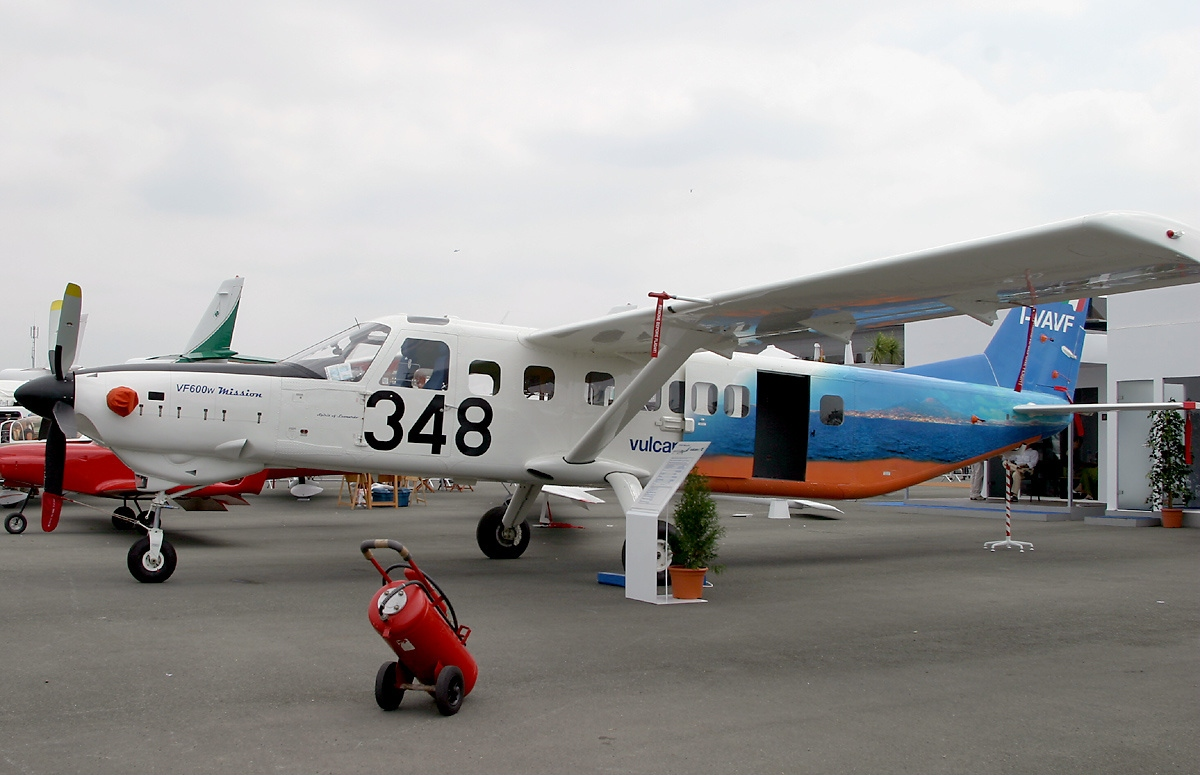
- Prototype in 2003

General information
- Type: Utility aircraft
- National origin: Italy
- Manufacturer: Vulcanair
- Status: Under development
- Number built: 1 prototype

History
- First flight: 4 December 2002

The Vulcanair VF600W Mission is an Italian single-engined utility transport, under development by Vulcanair of Casoria.

== Design and development ==
The Mission is based on the twin-engined Vulcanair Canguro but powered by a single Walter M601F-11 turboprop driving a five-bladed Avia propeller. It is a high-wing braced monoplane with a fixed tricycle landing gear and has seating for 10 to 16 passengers.

The prototype first flew on 4 December 2002. The aircraft was damaged in an incident at Casandrino on 19 December 2003.

In September 2006 VulcanAir's director of sales stated the VF600W was still an active programme, despite delays and a lack of company resources. He indicated that the aircraft was expected to resume test flying in August 2006 after which the company would provide a new estimate of when it would be certified.

In March 2019 the aircraft was not listed on the company website and no company updates had been released.

== Specifications (performance estimated) ==
Data from Jane's All The World's Aircraft 2003–2004

General characteristics

- Crew: 1
- Capacity: 10–16 passengers
- Length: 13.12 m (43 ft 1 in)
- Wingspan: 15.50 m (50 ft 10 in)
- Height: 4.55 m (14 ft 11 in)
- Max takeoff weight: 3,900 kg (8,598 lb)
- Powerplant: 1 × Walter M601F-11 turboprop, 580 kW (778 shp)

Performance

- Maximum speed: 352 km/h (219 mph, 190 kn)
- Cruise speed: 339 km/h (211 mph, 183 kn)
- Stall speed: 113 km/h (70 mph, 61 kn) (flaps down)
- Range: 2,000 km (1,200 mi, 1,100 nmi)
- Service ceiling: 6,095 m (19,997 ft)
- Rate of climb: 4.6 m/s (900 ft/min)
