= Partenavia Fachiro =

Italian touring aircraft

P.57 Fachiro
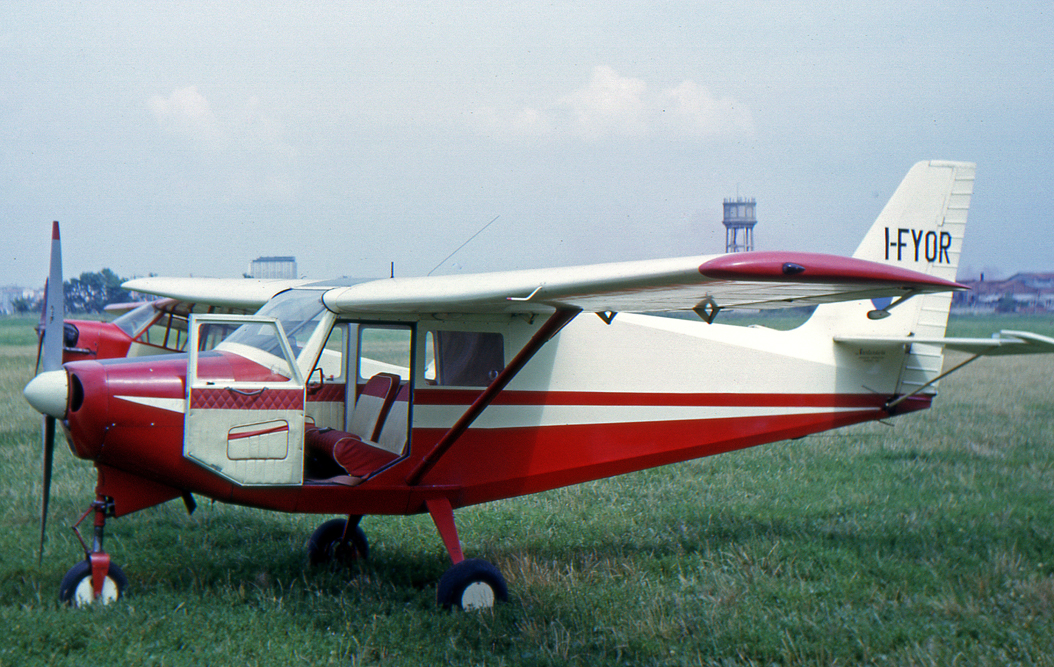
- P57 Fachiro IIf at Milan's Bresso airport in 1965

General information
- Type: Four-seat touring monoplane
- National origin: Italy
- Manufacturer: Partenavia
- Status: examples still flying
- Primary user: aero clubs and private pilot owners
- Number built: 37

History
- Introduction date: 1959
- First flight: 1958

The Partenavia P.57 Fachiro is an Italian, four-seat, high-wing, touring monoplane, fitted with a fixed tricycle undercarriage.

== Design and development ==
The P.57 was designed and built by Partenavia. The Lycoming O-320 powered Fachiro I first flew on 7 November 1958, followed by the Fachiro II, on 3 January 1959. A later version, designated the II-f, introduced a swept fin and rudder.

The Fachiro utilises mixed steel tube-and-fabric construction and is fitted with a 160 hp (119 kW) engine for aero club and general aviation use.

A one-off, all-metal version, the P.64 Fachiro III, was further developed as the P.64 Oscar.

Seven examples of the Fachiro IIf version remained in operation within Italy during spring 2009.

== Variants ==
P.57 Fachiro I
Powered by a 150 hp (112 kW) Lycoming O-320 engine.
P.57 Fachiro II
Powered by a 168 hp (125 kW)) Lycoming O-360-B2A engine. 3 built.
P.57 Fachiro II-f
Powered by a 180 hp (134 kW) Lycoming O-360-A2A engine. 33 built.
P.64 Fachiro III
An all-metal version developed as the P.64 Oscar 1 built.

== Specifications (Fachiro II-f) ==
Data from Jane's All The World's Aircraft 1965-66

General characteristics

- Crew: 1
- Capacity: 3 passengers
- Length: 6.625 m (21 ft 9 in)
- Wingspan: 9.138 m (30 ft 0 in)
- Height: 2.41 m (7 ft 11 in)
- Wing area: 13.40 m^{2} (144.2 sq ft)
- Aspect ratio: 6.23:1
- Airfoil: NACA 4412/4409
- Empty weight: 645 kg (1,422 lb)
- Max takeoff weight: 1,100 kg (2,425 lb)
- Fuel capacity: 160 L (42 US gal; 35 imp gal)
- Powerplant: 1 × Lycoming O-360-A2A air-cooled flat-four engine, 130 kW (180 hp)
- Propellers: 2-bladed Sensenich M74DM62 fixed-pitch propeller

Performance

- Maximum speed: 240 km/h (150 mph, 130 kn) at sea level
- Cruise speed: 190 km/h (120 mph, 100 kn) (econ. cruise, 50% power)
- Stall speed: 75 km/h (47 mph, 40 kn)
- Range: 900 km (560 mi, 490 nmi)
- Service ceiling: 4,200 m (13,800 ft)
- Rate of climb: 5.00 m/s (985 ft/min)
- Takeoff run to 15 m (50 ft): 503 m (1,650 ft)

== See also ==
Related development

- Partenavia Oscar
