= Harriet Sanborn Grosvenor =

American writer (1823–1863)

- Born: Harriet Ward Sanborn; January 22, 1823; Hampton Falls, New Hampshire, U.S.
- Died: September 7, 1863 (aged 40); Newburyport, Massachusetts, U.S.
- Occupation: Author
- Spouse: Edwin Prescott Grosvenor (after 1843)
- Children: Edwin A. Grosvenor
- Relatives: Gilbert H. Grosvenor (grandson)

Harriet Ward Sanborn Grosvenor (1823-1863) was an American writer and poet. 15 books she wrote were published.

== Personal life ==
She was born in Hampton Falls, New Hampshire on January 22, 1823, the daughter of Thayer S. Sanborn (1797–1874) and Deborah Ward (1804–1850). In 1843 married Edwin Prescott Grosvenor, M.D., of Newburyport, Massachusetts, where the couple resided after the wedding.

Harriet Grosvenor's son, Edwin A. Grosvenor, became a noted professor of history at Amherst College and her grandson, Gilbert H. Grosvenor, was the first employee and longtime President of the National Geographic Society and Editor of its magazine.

== Career ==
At the age of 24, she wrote My Sister Emily, published by the Massachusetts Sabbath School Society. After her husband's death in December 1856, Harriet supported her family largely by writing, which was an unusual achievement for a woman at the time. She also wrote hymns and broadsides.

=== Published works ===
Her published works include:

- My Sister Emily, 1847
- A Sabbath in My Early Home, 1850
- Unfading Flowers, 1851
- The Little Word No: Or, Indecision of Character, 1853
- Agnes Thornton: Or, School Duties, 1854
- Helen Spencer: Or, Home Duties, 1854
- Right and Wrong, 1855
- Ellen Dacre: Or, Life at Aunt Hester's, 1858
- Capt. Russel's Watchword: Or, "I'll Try," 1859
- Life's Lessons, 1859
- The Old Red House, 1860
- The Drunkard's Daughter, 1860
- Blind Ethan, A Story for Boys, 1860
- Why the Mill Was Stopped, 1861
- Climbing the Mountain, 1862
- Noonday: A Life Sketch, 1863
