= Partenavia Tigrotto =

P.52 Tigrotto

General information
- Type: Two-seat cabin monoplane
- National origin: Italy
- Manufacturer: Partenavia
- Number built: 1

History
- First flight: 1953

The Partenavia P.52 Tigrotto was a 1950s Italian light aircraft built by Partenavia in Naples.

== Development ==
The Tigrotto was a low-wing cabin monoplane with a retractable tailwheel landing gear. It had two-seats side-by-side and was powered by an 85 hp (63 kW) Continental C85 engine. The prototype and only Tigrotto, registered I-CARB, first flew in 1953.

== Specifications ==
General characteristics

- Crew: 1 (pilot)
- Capacity: 1 (passenger)
- Powerplant: 1 × Continental C85-12F , 63 kW (85 hp)

Performance

- Maximum speed: 235 km/h (146 mph, 127 kn)
- Cruise speed: 200 km/h (124 mph, 108 kn)
