= Partenavia Alpha =

P.70 Alpha

General information
- Type: Aerobatic trainer
- National origin: Italy
- Manufacturer: Partenavia
- Designer: Luigi Pascale
- Number built: 1

History
- First flight: 24 April 1972

The Partenavia P.70 Alpha was a 1970s Italian two-seat light aerobatic trainer designed by Luigi Pascale and built by Partenavia.

== Design and development ==
The Alpha was a low-wing monoplane with a fixed tricycle landing gear and powered by a 100 hp (75 kW) Rolls-Royce Continental O-200-A engine. The Alpha first flew on the 24 April, 1972, but only one was built and it did not enter production as the company was pre-occupied with producing the Partenavia P.68.

== Specifications ==
Data from Jane's All the World's Aircraft 1973-74

General characteristics

- Crew: 2
- Length: 7.06 m (23 ft 2 in)
- Wingspan: 8.5 m (27 ft 11 in)
- Height: 3.00 m (9 ft 10 in)
- Wing area: 11.60 m^{2} (125 sq ft)
- Empty weight: 480 kg (1,014 lb)
- Gross weight: 700 kg (1,543 lb)
- Powerplant: 1 × Rolls-Royce Continental O-200-A four-cylinder horizontallt-opposed air-cooled piston engine , 75 kW (100 hp)

Performance

- Maximum speed: 225 km/h (140 mph, 120 kn)
- Cruise speed: 210 km/h (130 mph, 110 kn)
- Range: 880 km (546 mi, 474 nmi)
- Service ceiling: 4,000 m (13,125 ft)
- g limits: +6 -3
- Rate of climb: 4.00 m/s (787 ft/min)

== Bibliography ==
- The Illustrated Encyclopedia of Aircraft (Part Work 1982-1985). Orbis Publishing.
- Simpson, R.W. (1991). Airlife's General Aviation. England: Airlife Publishing. ISBN 1-85310-194-X.
- Taylor, John W.R., ed. (1973). Jane's All the World's Aircraft 1973-74. London, United Kingdom: Jane's Yearbooks. ISBN 0-354-00117-5.
