= Vulcanair =

Italian aircraft manufacturer

- Company type: Private
- Founded: 1996
- Headquarters: Casoria, Italy
- Area served: Worldwide
- Website: vulcanair.com

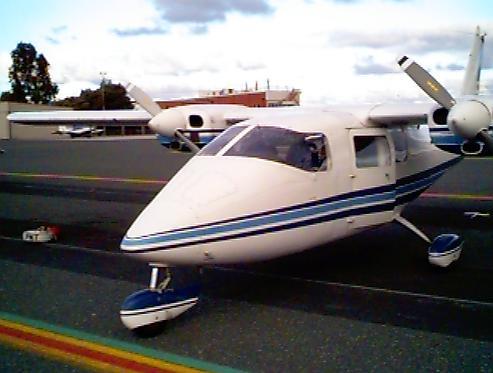
Aircraft example: Partenavia P68 (VH-PNT) at Jandakot Airport, Jandakot, Australia

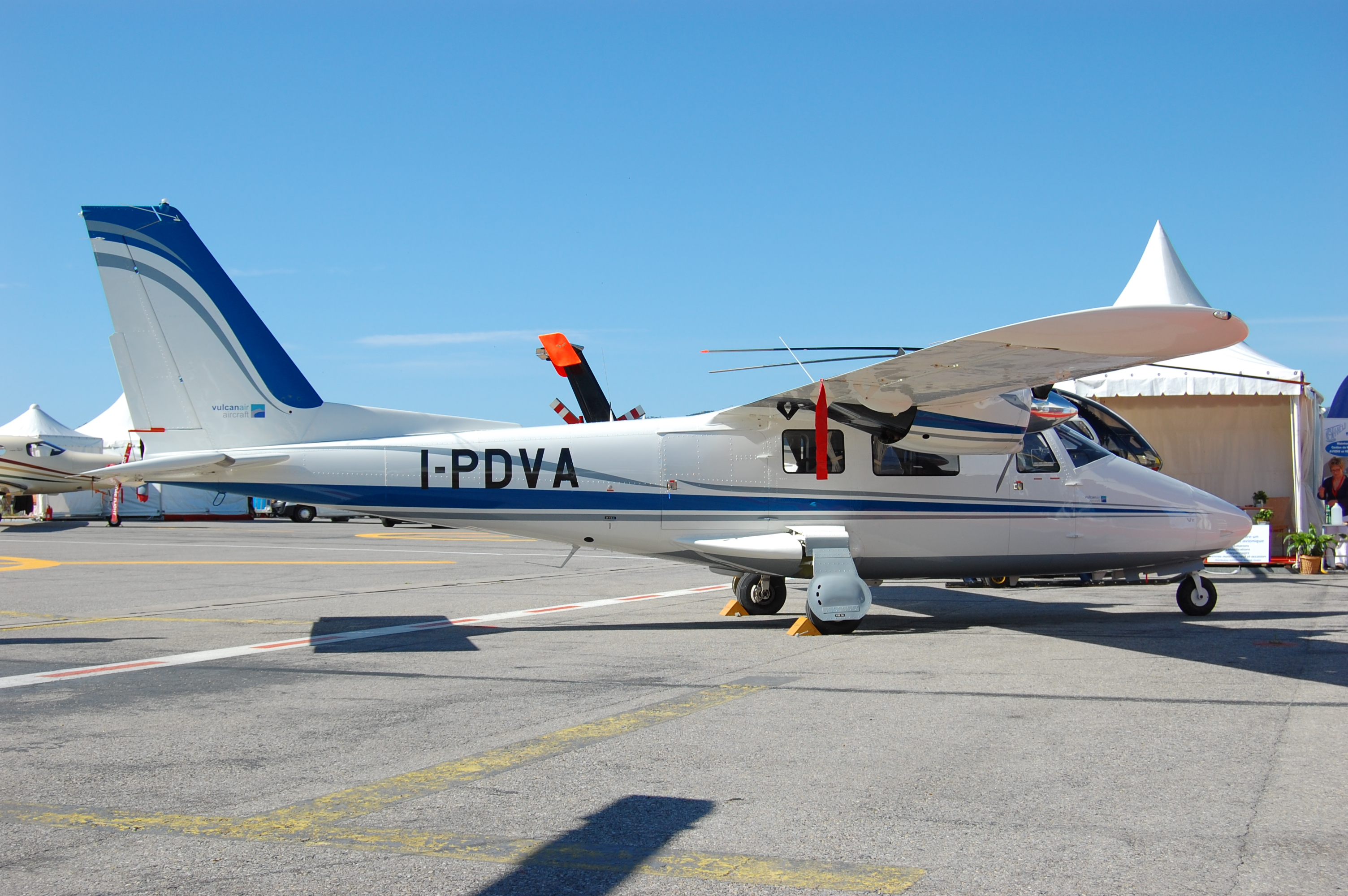
Side view of Vulcanair P68R (Retractable Undercarriage Version) P68 (I-PDVA) at Nice Airport, Nice, France

Vulcanair is an Italian aircraft manufacturer based in Casoria, near Naples.

== History ==
Partenavia was established in 1957 by Prof. Luigi Pascale and produced a quite large family of single-engined sport aircraft which eventually culminated with the successful twin-engined P.68 Victor and its derivatives.

The Canguro was designed by aeronautical engineer Stelio Frati in the 1970s (first flight on December 30, 1978) for Siai Marchetti that, in 1981, developed the SF.600A version, with turboprop engine, retractable landing gear and cargo capability with lateral sliding door or hinged rear fuselage. Today just ten Canguro have been produced.

Former spare parts producer Vulcanair set up a programme to produce a complete range of Italian designed twin-engined light transport aircraft. Vulcanair was founded in 1996 after purchasing all the assets, type design, trademarks and rights of the bankrupt Partenavia. In 1997, Vulcanair took over the SIAI-Marchetti SF.600 Canguro programme from Finmeccanica and later acquired Samanta, a Naples-based air-work operator with SF.600 and P.68 experience. Around 1998, Vulcanair took over Milan-based Aercosmos that had bought Partenavia Costruzioni Aeronautiche SpA from Alenia in 1993.

Vulcanair was then in the position to revive the production of twin-engined aircraft ranging from the basic P.68C to the turbine-powered 8,000 lbs MTOW Canguro (possibly in a stretched version). The Brazilian prestigious "Aero Magazine" named the P68C best aeroplane, 2010/2011, at the "XII Prêmio Aero Magazine de Aviação".

Vulcanair's current products are based upon the designs of Stelio Frati (SF600A Canguro) and Luigi Pascale (P68 Series). The current production lineup is the P68C (in normally aspirated and turbocharged variants), the P68 Observer 2 (a surveillance orientated variant with a mainly Perspex cockpit, again in normally aspirated and turbocharged versions), a retractable undercarriage variant of the normally aspirated P68C, the P68R (or Vr), a Rolls-Royce RR250-B17C turboprop powered 11 seat AP68TP-600 A-Viator and the SF600A Canguro.

Vulcanair production takes place on a 60,000 square metres site at Capodichino Airport in Naples, Italy.

== Aircraft ==
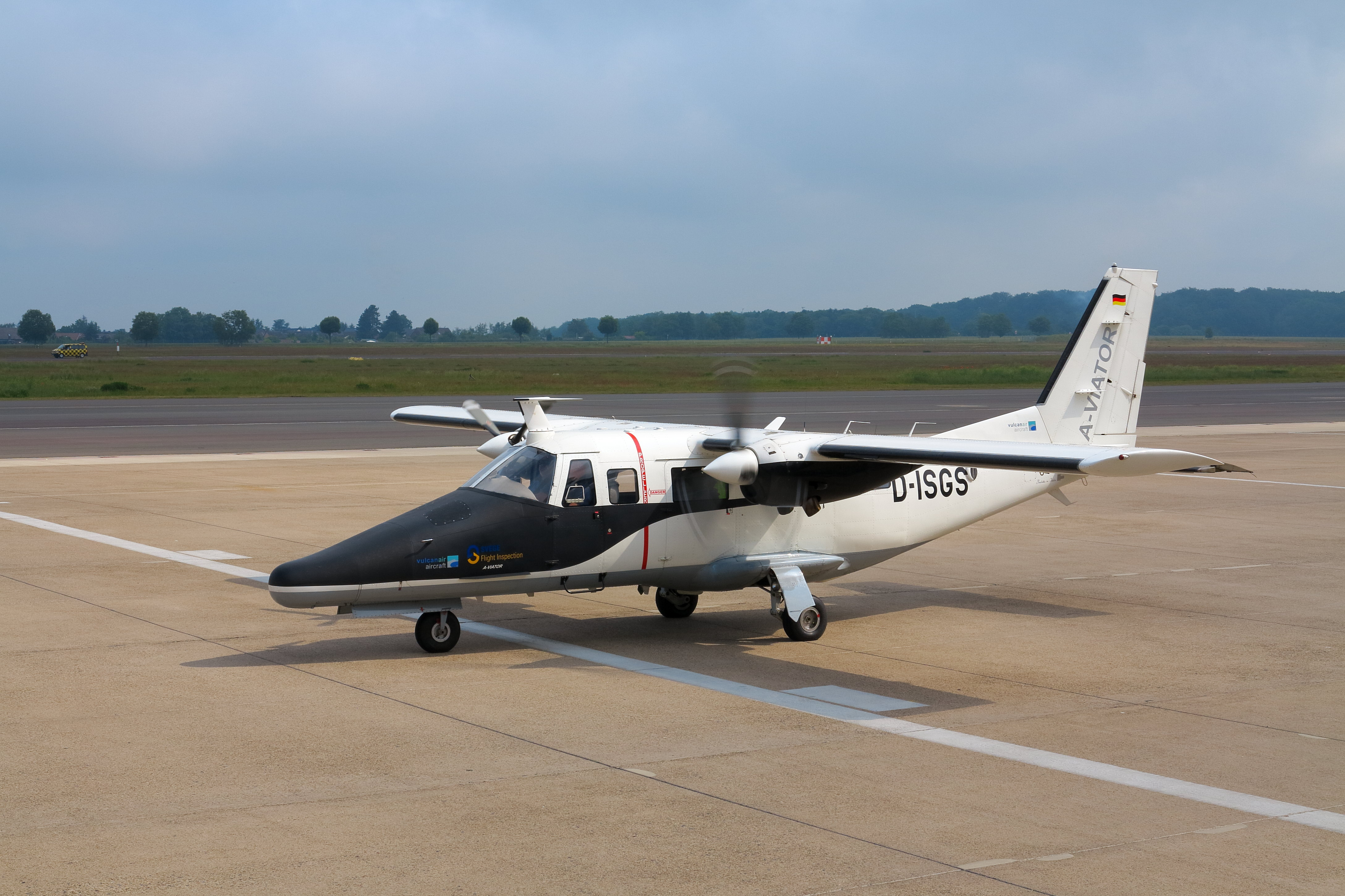
Vulcanair A-Viator

- Vulcanair Canguro
- Vulcanair Mission
- Vulcanair P68 Series
- Vulcanair V1.0

== See also ==
- List of Italian companies
