= Partenavia Oscar =

Italian single-engined, high-wing monoplane

Oscar / Charlie
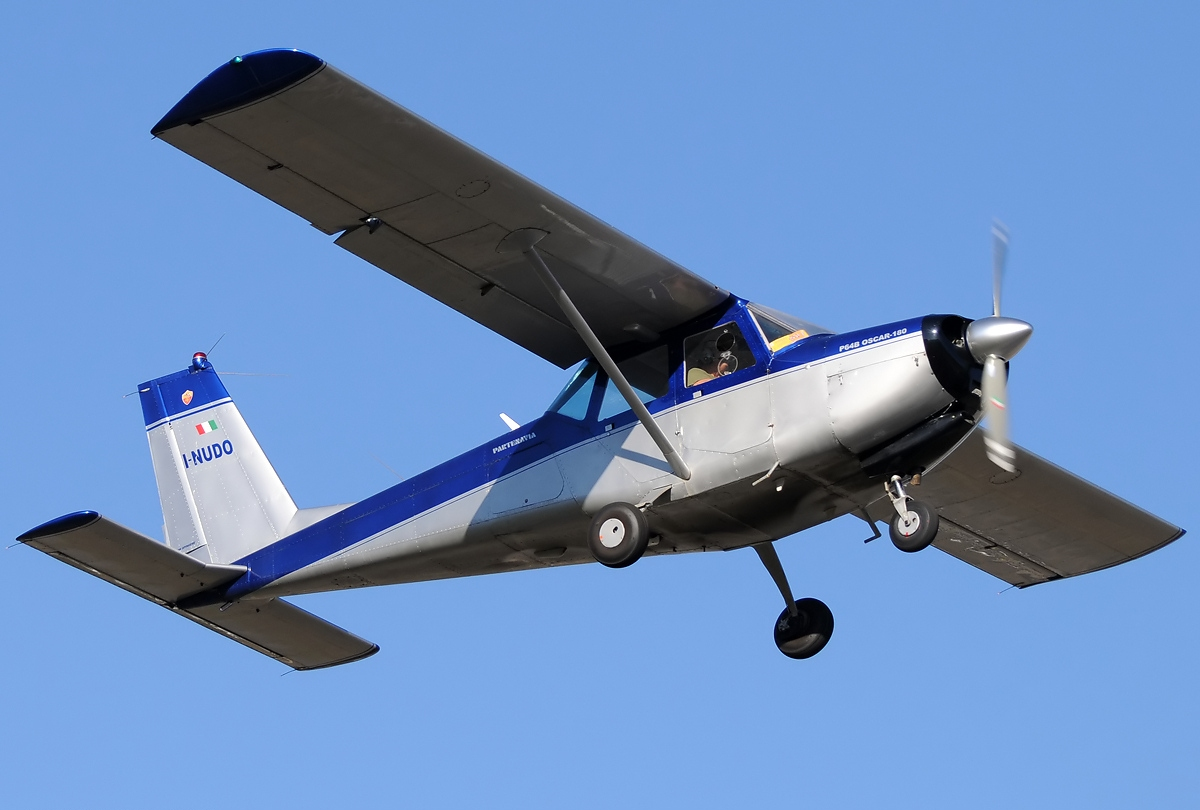

General information
- Type: Light tourer
- Manufacturer: Partenavia
- Designer: Luigi Pascale
- Primary user: Aero Club d'Italia
- Number built: 312

History
- Introduction date: 1967
- First flight: 2 April 1965
- Developed from: Partenavia Fachiro
- Variant: Vulcanair V1.0

The Partenavia P.64B/P.66B Oscar is an Italian two/four-seat, single-engined, high-wing monoplane built by Partenavia.

== Development ==
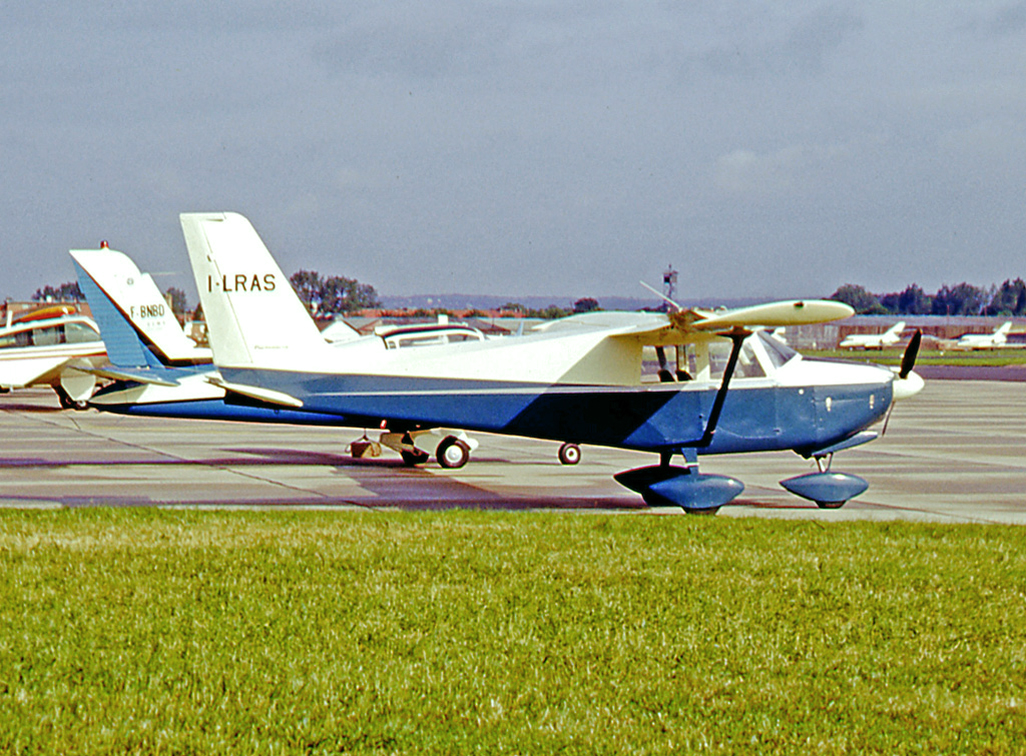
The prototype Partenavia Oscar at the 1965 Paris Air Show

Developed as an all-metal version of the P.57 Fachiro, the prototype was designated the P.64 Fachiro III and first flew on 2 April 1965. Improvements were made to the design, mainly to the rear fuselage to fit a panoramic rear window, and now renamed the P.64B Oscar B it first flew in 1967. Also known as the Oscar 180 powered by a 180 hp Lycoming O-360-A1A piston engine, a 200 hp version (with a Lycoming O-360-A1B engine) was known as the Oscar-200. Twenty-one aircraft were delivered to South Africa and assembled by AFIC (Pty) Limited and marketed as the AFIC RSA 200 Falcon.

In January 1976, the company flew a new fully aerobatic version, the P.66C Charlie, and 96 were built, mainly for the Aero Club d'Italia.

== Variants ==
- P.64 Fachiro III - Prototype, one built.
- P.64B Oscar B - Production aircraft with cut-down rear fuselage and 180 hp (134 kW) Lycoming engine, 64 built.
- P.64B Oscar 180 - Marketing name for the Oscar B.
- P.64B Oscar 200 - 200 hp version of the Oscar B, 9 built.
- P.66B Oscar 100 - Two-seat version with 100 hp (75 kW) Lycoming engine, 80 built.
- P.66B Oscar 150 - Three-seat version with 150 hp (112 kW) Lycoming O-320 engine, 50 built.
- P.66C Charlie - Four-seat aerobatic version of the P.66B with 160 hp Lycoming engine, 107 built.
- P.66D Delta - P.66B with minor changes, one built.
- P.66T Charlie - Two-seat trainer version of the P.66C, one built.
- AFIC RSA 200 Falcon - South-African version of the P.64.

== Operators ==
Italy

- Italian State Police
- South Africa

== Specifications (P.66C-160 Charlie) ==
Data from Jane's All The World's Aircraft 1982-83

General characteristics

- Crew: 1
- Capacity: 3 pax
- Length: 7.24 m (23 ft 9 in)
- Wingspan: 9.986 m (32 ft 9 in)
- Height: 2.77 m (9 ft 1 in)
- Wing area: 13.4 m^{2} (144 sq ft)
- Aspect ratio: 7.45
- Airfoil: NACA 63A515
- Empty weight: 600 kg (1,323 lb)
- Max takeoff weight: 990 kg (2,183 lb)
- Fuel capacity: 162 L (43 US gal; 36 imp gal) fuel ; 7.5 L (2 US gal; 2 imp gal) oil
- Powerplant: 1 × Lycoming O-320-H2AD 4-cylinder air-cooled horizontally-opposed piston engine, 119 kW (160 hp)
- Propellers: 2-bladed Hoffmann Propeller HO 23-183.150, 1.88 m (6 ft 2 in) diameter fixed-pitch propeller

Performance

- Maximum speed: 241 km/h (150 mph, 130 kn)
- Cruise speed: 218 km/h (135 mph, 118 kn) Maximum, at 75% power and 1,980 m (6,496 ft)

206 km/h (128 mph; 111 kn) Economical, at 65% power and 2,745 m (9,006 ft)

- Stall speed: 98.5 km/h (61.2 mph, 53.2 kn) flaps up

93 km/h (58 mph; 50 kn) take-off flap
82 km/h (51 mph; 44 kn) landing flap

- Range: 854 km (531 mi, 461 nmi) at Max cruise with reserve fuel

975 km (606 mi; 526 nmi) at Economical cruise with reserve fuel

- Endurance: 3 hours 54 minutes at Max cruise

4 hours 44 minutes at Economical cruise

- Service ceiling: 4,570 m (14,990 ft)
- Rate of climb: 4.82 m/s (949 ft/min)
- Wing loading: 73.88 kg/m^{2} (15.13 lb/sq ft)
- Power/mass: 0.0734 hp/lb (0.1207 kW/kg)
- Take-off run: 245 m (804 ft)
- Take-off distance to 15 m (49 ft): 420 m (1,378 ft)
- Landing run: 150 m (492 ft)
- Landing distance from 15 m (49 ft): 350 m (1,148 ft)

== See also ==
Related development

- Vulcanair V1.0

Aircraft of comparable role, configuration, and era

- Cessna 172
- Cessna 150
