= Partenavia =

Italian aircraft manufacturer

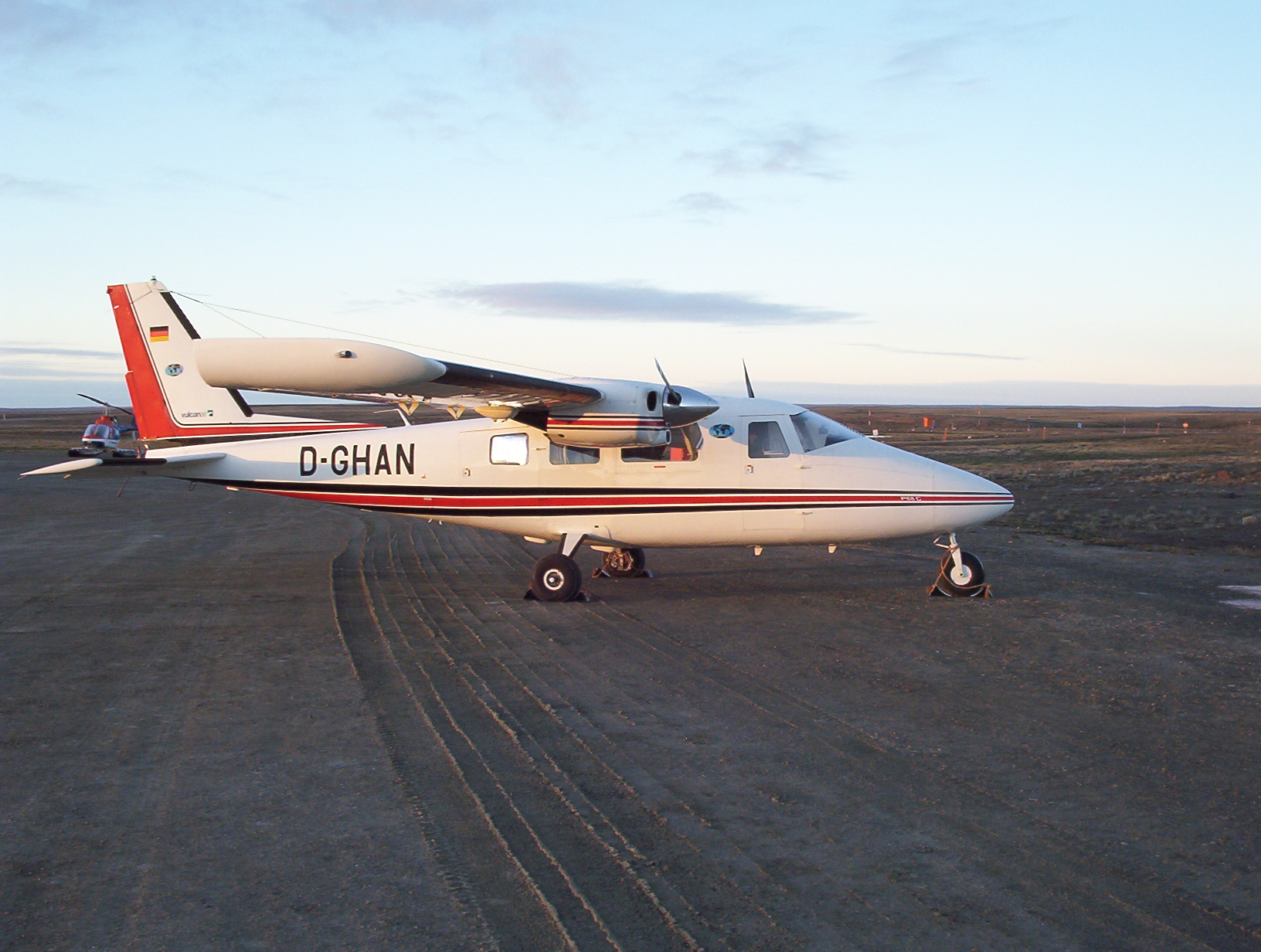
- A Partenavia P.68
- Founded: 1957

Partenavia Construzioni Aeronautiche was an Italian aircraft manufacturer that specialised in general aviation.

The company operated between 1957 and 1998. Founded by Professor Luigi Pascale, Partenavia became a limited company in 1959, and was acquired by the Italian state-owned aerospace firm Aeritalia during 1981. During the 1980s, the firm concentrated activity on the production of two aircraft, the P.68 twin-engined multi-mission transport and the P.66C Charlie trainer aircraft. During 1991, Partenavia was sold to Aercosmos; seven years later, the firm was declared bankrupt and was dissolved. Much of its assets were acquired by rival aircraft manufacturer Vulcanair, who continued the production and development of some parts of the company's former product range.

In 1986, the two Pascale brothers founded the Italian aircraft design/manufacturing firm Tecnam where the naming of the Aircraft still follows the rule of having a capital "P" that stands for "Pascale" followed by a number that stands for the year of the original design.

== History ==
Partenavia was established in 1957 by Professor Luigi Pascale of Naples University; Pascale had been motivated to found the company with the purpose to creating aircraft that would be accessible to all people. That same year, the company acquired an existing factory located at Arzano in the Metropolitan City of Naples. Partenavia headquartered itself in the city as well. During 1959, it was reorganised as a limited company.

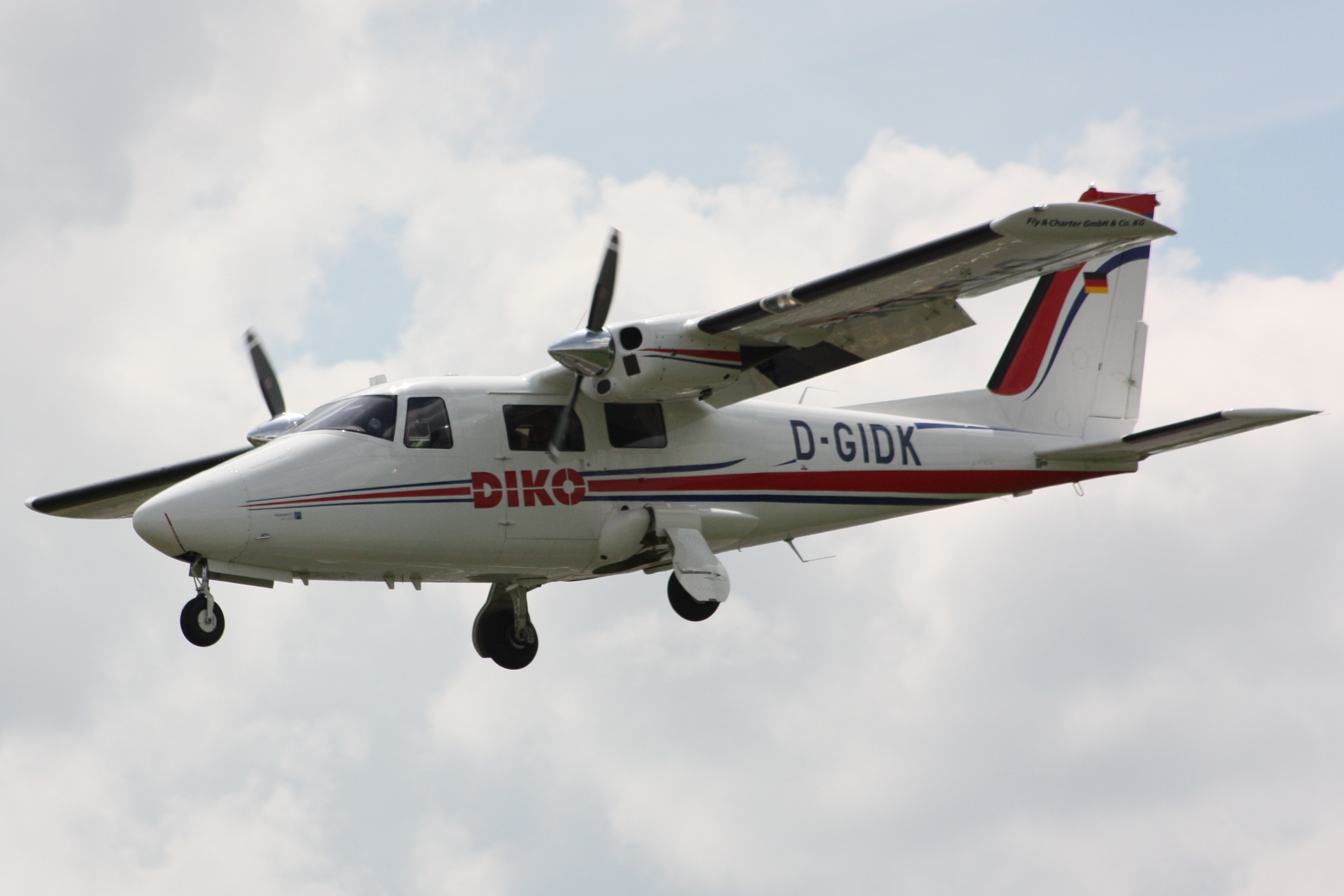
A P.68R in flight

The first major aircraft to be produced by the company was the P.57 Fachiro, a four-seat high wing aircraft principally intended for the flying club sector. Several years later, an all-metal version, the Oscar, replaced the Fachiro on the production lines. Pascale proceeded to develop and produce a wide range of inhouse-designed aircraft. Perhaps the most well recognised of its designs was the twin-engined P.68, a light multi-mission transport aircraft that made its maiden flight during 1970.

During 1981, Partenavia became a part of the Italian state-owned aerospace group Aeritalia; despite its new ownership, the firm received little financial support from its parent company. Thereafter, Partenavia concentrated its resources on the P.66C Charlie monoplane trainer aircraft, producing in excess of 100 for the Aero Club d'Italia. By 1986, the firm reportedly employed around 150 workers to manufacture two aircraft models, the P.66 and P.68. During the 1980s, the P68 was re-engined and marketed in the North American market under the Spartacus brand as a business aircraft, where roughly half of yearly sales were being made by this point in time.

During 1993, Alenia sold the company to Aercosmos. Two years later, Indian firm Taneja Aerospace and Aviation assembled the first of its P.68 which it was building under licence in India. However, the company did not perform well overall under its new owner. In March 1998, Partenavia was declared bankrupt. During the company's liquidation, aircraft manufacturer Vulcanair acquired all of Partenavia's former assets, including design rights and trademarks. In addition to supporting the type, Vulcanair subsequently put the P.68 back into production under its own brand. Various upgrades and enhancements to former Partenavia aircraft have been implemented by Vulcanair.

== Aircraft ==
- P.48 Astore
- P.52 Tigrotto
- P.53 Aeroscooter
- P.55 Tornado
- P.57 Fachiro
- P.59 Jolly
- P.64 Fachiro III
- P.64B Oscar
- P.66B Oscar
- P.66C Charlie
- P.66D Delta
- P.66T Charlie
- P.68 Victor
- P.70 Alpha
- P.86 Mosquito
- AP.68TP-300 Spartacus
- AP.68TP-600 Viator

== See also ==
- List of Italian companies
