= Edwin A. Grosvenor =

American historian (1845–1936)

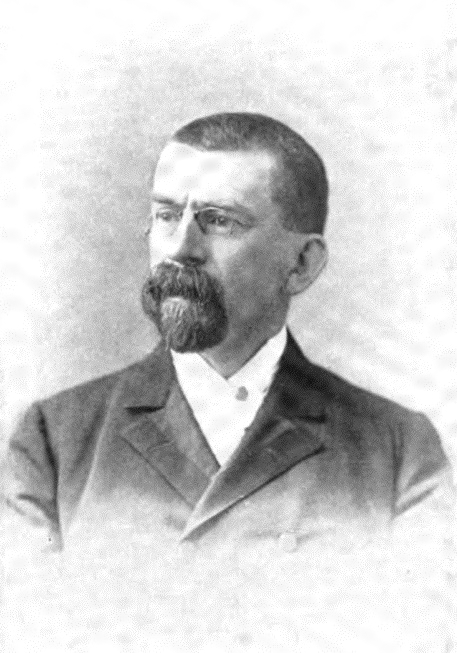
- Born: Edwin Augustus Grosvenor; August 30, 1845; West Newbury, Massachusetts, U.S.
- Died: September 15, 1936 (aged 91); Amherst, Massachusetts, U.S.
- Education: Brown High School; Amherst College
- Spouse: Lilian Hovey Waters (m. 1873)
- Children: 2, including Gilbert
- Mother: Harriet Sanborn Grosvenor

Edwin Augustus Grosvenor (August 30, 1845 – September 15, 1936) was an American historian, author, chairman of the history department at Amherst College, and president of the national organization of Phi Beta Kappa societies from 1907 to 1919. Grosvenor was called "one of the most cosmopolitan of Americans" by author and abolitionist Thomas Wentworth Higginson. His son, Gilbert Hovey Grosvenor, was the first employee and longtime editor of National Geographic Magazine.

== Early years ==
Grosvenor was born in 1845 in West Newbury, Massachusetts, the son of Dr. Edwin Prescott Grosvenor and the author Harriet Sanborn Grosvenor.

He prepared at Brown High School in Newburyport, and graduated from Amherst College in 1867 as class poet and salutatorian. After graduating, he served as a tutor at Robert College in Constantinople, Ottoman Empire (now Istanbul, Turkey). After returning to the U.S., he obtained an M.A. from Amherst College and was ordained as a minister in Newburyport in 1872.

== Career ==
In 1872, Edwin Grosvenor returned to Robert College with his young wife and began teaching. Grosvenor then taught at Amherst College from 1892 to 1914, and was professor emeritus until his death in 1936.

His two volume Constantinople was "the most important treatise ... that has yet appeared in English," wrote a reviewer in the Springfield Republican. "One of the books of the year." The New York Times said that Grosvenor was "uniquely suited to the task." Grosvenor was President of the United Chapters Phi Beta Kappa from 1907 to 1919 and a frequent commencement speaker, often talking on the subject of "the love of wisdom is the guide of life … knowledge applied to right uses and to the service of man."

Grosvenor received honorary degrees from Wabash College, Alfred University, Marietta College, and the College of William & Mary. Grosvenor was elected a member of the American Antiquarian Society in 1896. He was a member of the Authors' Club, and numerous other societies. A member of the Democratic Party, he was the party's nominee for Secretary of the Commonwealth of Massachusetts in 1915. He lost to Republican incumbent Albert P. Langtry 258,216 votes to 192,330.

== Personal life ==
On October 23, 1873, Grosvenor married Lilian Hovey Waters (b. 1852), of Millbury. Lilian was the daughter of Col. Asa Holman Waters and the granddaughter of the gunsmith Asa Waters. Together, Edwin and Lilian resided for a number of years in the Waters Mansion in Millbury. Just over two years later, the couple gave birth to twins on October 28, 1875:

- Editor/President of the National Geographic Society Gilbert Hovey Grosvenor (1875–1966), married Elsie May Bell (1878–1964), the daughter of Alexander Graham Bell. His grandson Edwin S. Grosvenor is editor in chief of American Heritage.
- Edwin Prescott Grosvenor (1875–1930), who married Thelma Somerville Cudlipp (1891–1983) in 1918. After his death, she married Charles Seymour Whitman, the former Governor of New York.

Grosvenor died in Amherst on September 15, 1936.

== Bibliography ==
=== Books ===
- The Hippodrome of Constantinople: and Its Still Existing Monuments, 1889, 62 pages
- Constantinople, Volume 1 and 2, Roberts Brothers, 1895 LCCN=04022752. With an introduction by General Lew Wallace.
- Andronike, the Heroine of the Greek Revolution, by Stephanos Theodoros Xenos, translated from the Original Greek by E.A. Grosvenor, Boston, Mass., 1897.
- Permanence of the Greek Type, American Antiquarian Society, 1898.
- Contemporary History of the World, Thomas Y. Crowell & Co., 1899
- A General History of the World, Volumes 1 to 4, with Victor Duruy and Louis Edwin Van Norman, The Review of Reviews Co., 1912

=== Selected articles ===
- "Address for the United Chapters," in Addresses at the Presentation of the Chapter Rooms in Morris Pratt Memorial Library, Phi Beta Kappa, 1913
- "Constantinople and Sancta Sophia," National Geographic, May, 1915, pp. 459–482.
- "Evolution of Russian Government," National Geographic, July, 1905, pp. 309–332.
- "Growth of Russia," National Geographic, May, 1900, pp. 169–185.
- "Last Night of the Misolonghi," published in the New Century Speaker, a collection of extracts by Prof. Henry Allyn Frink, Ph.D., Ginn & C., Boston, 1898, page 52.
- "Races of Europe," National Geographic, December, 1918, pages 441–553.

== External link ==
- Grosvenor Family Papers, Manuscript Division, Library of Congress, Washington, D.C.

Party political offices
Preceded by Frank J. Donahue	Democratic nominee for Secretary of the Commonwealth of Massachusetts; 1915	Succeeded by Leon R. Eyges
