= SIAI-Marchetti S.700 Cormorano =

S.700 Cormorano

General information
- Type: General-purpose amphibian
- National origin: Italy
- Manufacturer: SIAI-Marchetti
- Designer: Stelio Frati
- Status: Not built

History
- Developed from: SF.600 Canguro

The SIAI-Marchetti S.700 Cormorano was an Italian proposal for a twin-engined amphibian based on the SF.600 Canguro.

== Development ==
The S.700 was designed to use as much of the SF.600 as possible to build a twin-engined amphibian, changes required included a stronger wing due to the increased all-up weight. The S.700 was a high-wing cantilever monoplane with the ability to land on water or use a retractable tricycle landing gear. The hull and floats were to be made of composite materials and the engines were to be fitted on the upper surface of the wings to protect against spray. It was planned that the aircraft could use the Italian Alfa Romeo AR-318 turboprop with three-bladed tractor propellers. As well as use as a freighter or general utility aircraft with 12 seats it was also proposed to use it as a water bomber with a capacity for 1,300 L (343 US gal) of water or retardants.

== Specifications ==
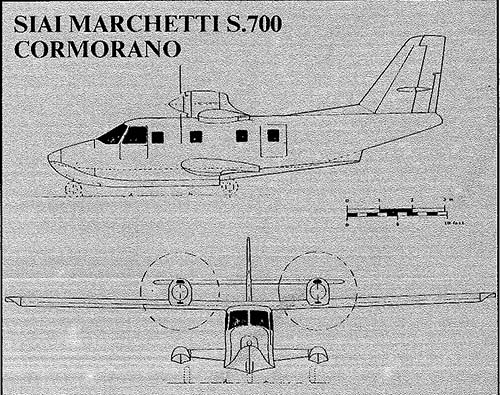
3-view line drawing of the SIAI-Marchetti S.700 Cormorano

Data from

General characteristics

- Crew: 1 or 2
- Capacity: 12-seat cabin
- Length: 12.15 m (39 ft 10 in)
- Wingspan: 15 m (49 ft 3 in)
- Height: 3.6 m (11 ft 10 in)
- Wing area: 24 m^{2} (260 sq ft)
- Empty weight: 2,250 kg (4,960 lb)
- Max takeoff weight: 4,200 kg (9,259 lb)
- Powerplant: 2 × Alfa-Romeo AR-318 turboprop, 430 kW (580 hp) each
- Propellers: 3-bladed variable-pitch and reversible

Performance

- Cruise speed: 330 km/h (210 mph, 180 kn) at 3,000 m (9,800 ft)
- Range: 1,600 km (990 mi, 860 nmi)
- Service ceiling: 6,700 m (22,000 ft)
- Rate of climb: 7.1 m/s (1,400 ft/min)

== See also ==
Related lists

- List of flying boats and floatplanes
