= Thelma Cudlipp =

American artist and book illustrator (1891–1983)

- Born: Thelma Somerville Cudlipp; 14 October 1891; Richmond, Virginia, US
- Died: 2 April 1983 (aged 91); Greenwich, Connecticut, US
- Occupations: Artist, illustrator
- Spouses: Edwin Prescott Grosvenor (m. 1918; died 1930) Charles Seymour Whitman (m. 1933; died 1947)
- Children: 2

Thelma Somerville Cudlipp (14 October 1891 – 2 April 1983) was an American artist and book illustrator.

== Early life ==
Thelma was born in Richmond, Virginia on 14 October 1891. She was the daughter of Frederick Dallas Cudlipp and Annie (née Ericsson) Cudlipp. Her mother died in Bermuda on 24 June 1915.

After her father died in Virginia in 1903, then in her teens, she came to New York City to study art. Her mother was an assistant editor on The Delineator in 1909 when Theodore Dreiser was managing editor. Dreiser became infatuated with Thelma, but her mother was strongly opposed to Dreiser's involvement with her daughter,which was platonic, because Dreiser was married and 20 years her senior. Thelma's mother succeeded in breaking up the relationship by sending Thelma to England and by reporting it to the directors of the Butterick Publishing Company, which cost Dreiser his job.

== Artistic career ==
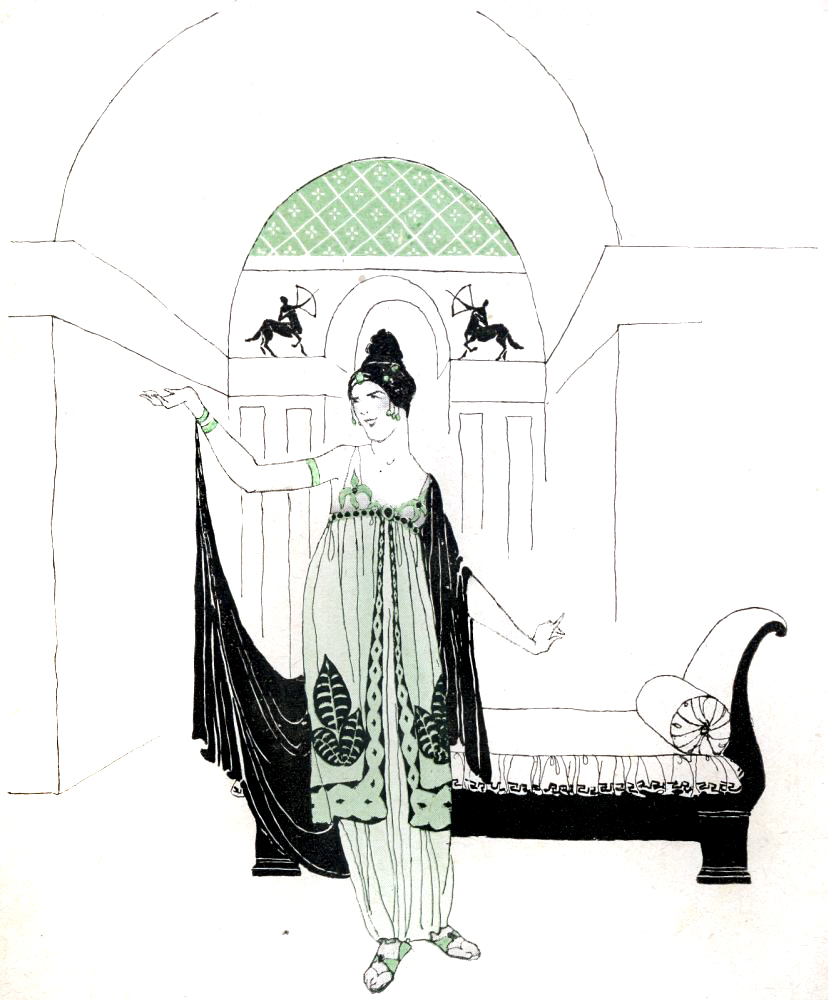
"Mme. Geraldine Farrar in Greek Costume as Thaïs" / Thelma Cudlipp frontispiece Woman as Decoration / Emily Burbank (New York: Dodd, Mead and Company, 1917)

In England, Cudlipp continued her training in art, winning a scholarship to the Royal Academy Schools but she did not enroll. When she returned to the U.S., she took lessons from Kenneth Hayes Miller, one of Dreiser's friends. She became well known as an illustrator for various newspapers and magazines, such as Harper's, The Century Magazine, McClure's, and The Saturday Evening Post. In addition to her own work, she developed an interest in pre-Columbian sculpture, which she collected and promoted through lectures. She later developed a friendship with Dreiser, but it was not of a romantic nature. They exchanged letters with each other until Dreiser's death.

In 1932, Thelma had an exhibition of her paintings at the Marie Sterner Galleries. In 1933, she was "declared the winner of the popular prize of $25" for her painting, entitled Victorian Place, in the annual exhibition of the Newport Art Association.

== Personal life ==
In 1918, she married Edwin Prescott Grosvenor (1875–1930), a successful attorney with Cadwalader, Wickersham & Taft, and cousin of former president William Howard Taft. Edwin was the son of Edwin A. Grosvenor and brother of Gilbert Hovey Grosvenor, who married Elsie May Bell (daughter of Alexander Graham Bell). Together, they were the parents of two daughters: Anne Somerville Grosvenor (1919–2001), who married Dwight Edwards Robinson Jr. in 1945., and Louise Taft Grosvenor (1921–1987), who married Montana politician Sumner Gerard.

After her husband's death in 1930, she married Charles Seymour Whitman in 1933. Whitman had been governor of New York from 1915 to 1918. He died in 1947.

She died on 2 April 1983 in Greenwich, Connecticut. She was buried at Washington Cemetery on the Green in Litchfield County, Connecticut.
