= New York State Police =

State police agency serving New York

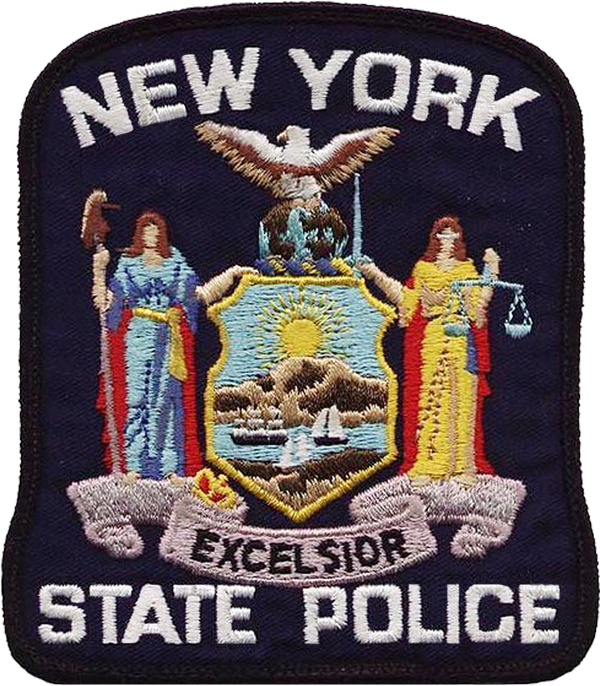
- Patch

- Seal

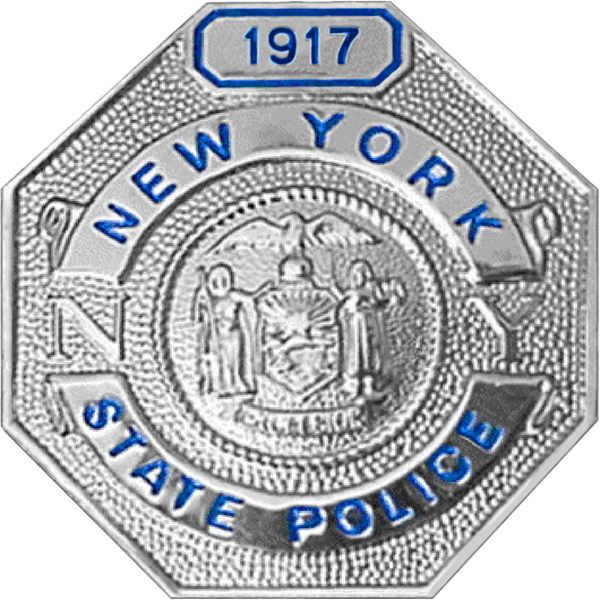
- Shield of New York State Police

- Flag of the State of New York
- Common name: New York State Troopers
- Abbreviation: NYSP
- Motto: Excellence Through Knowledge

Agency overview
- Formed: April 11, 1917; 109 years ago
- Employees: 5,711 (as of 2018)
- Annual budget: $926,123,000 (2018)

Jurisdictional structure
- Operations jurisdiction: New York, U.S.
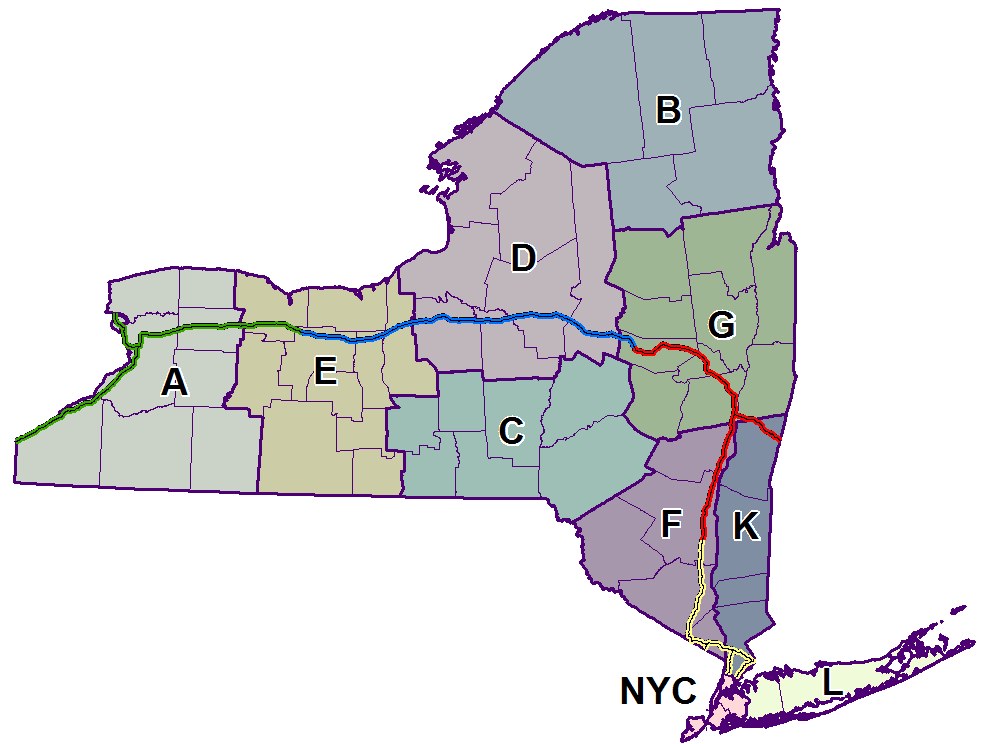
- Troops of the New York State Police
- Area: 54,556 sq mi (141,300 km^{2})
- Population: 19.4 million
- Legal jurisdiction: State of New York
- Governing body: New York State Executive Department
- General nature: Civilian police

Operational structure
- Headquarters: Building 22 W. Averell Harriman State Office Building Campus; Albany, New York, United States
- Troopers: ▲5,110 (2025)
- Non-sworn members: 711
- Agency executive: Steven G. James, superintendent

Facilities
- Troops: 11

Website
- Official site

The New York State Police (NYSP) is the state police of the U.S. state of New York; it is part of the New York State Executive Department and employs over 5,000 sworn state troopers and 711 non-sworn members.

The New York State Police are responsible for patrolling state highways, rural communities, and providing law enforcement services across the state.

== History ==
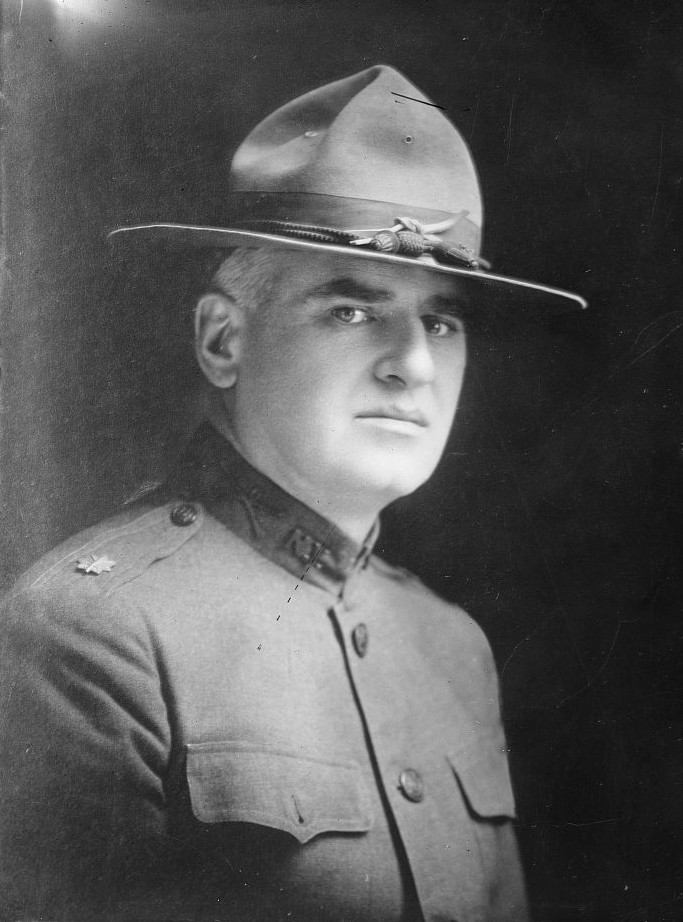
George Fletcher Chandler, the first superintendent of the New York State Police

=== Establishment ===
A number of proposals to create a state police force occurred during the early 1900s, but faced considerable opposition from trade union interests. They feared the police would be used against union organizing, as was happening in several other states, particularly with the Coal and Iron Police in Pennsylvania.

The New York State Police was established following the 1913 murder of Sam Howell, a construction foreman in Bedford, Westchester County, and the failure of the local police to arrest suspects he had named before his death.

In March 1917, the New York State Legislature passed a bill to establish a state police force and appropriated $500,000 in funding. The bill was signed into law on April 11, 1917 by New York Governor Charles Seymour Whitman.

=== 20th century ===
The division's first superintendent was George Fletcher Chandler, who was appointed by Governor Whitman. Chandler is credited with much of the division's early organization and development. Chandler coined the term "New York State Troopers." He was an early advocate of officers carrying their weapons exposed on a belt, which was not common practice at the time.

In 1920, the New York State Troopers had a conviction rate of 94.6 percent.

On January 1, 1980, the Long Island State Parkway Police merged with the state police; this resulted in the official establishment of Troop L. In October 1997, the New York State Capital Police was consolidated and absorbed into the state police.

Since February 1994, the agency has accepted DNA evidence for forensic investigation and analysis. The New York State Police Forensic Investigation Center (FIC) opened in November 1996. The Crime Laboratory performs DNA analysis for state investigations and for local law enforcement. It includes a new DNA Data Bank Section that compiles DNA records from violent felons sentenced to prison in New York State. These records can be searched and compared by computer to other evidence collected in unsolved crimes.

=== 21st century ===
In December 2019, Governor Andrew Cuomo announced that the New York State Park Police was to be merged with the New York State Police. The merger was expected to take about six months. Cuomo resigned in August 2021, and by January 2022, New York officials announced that the two police forces would remain separate.

From its establishment in 1917 until 2024, a total of 162 officers and two K9s have died in the line of duty.

== Structure and organization ==
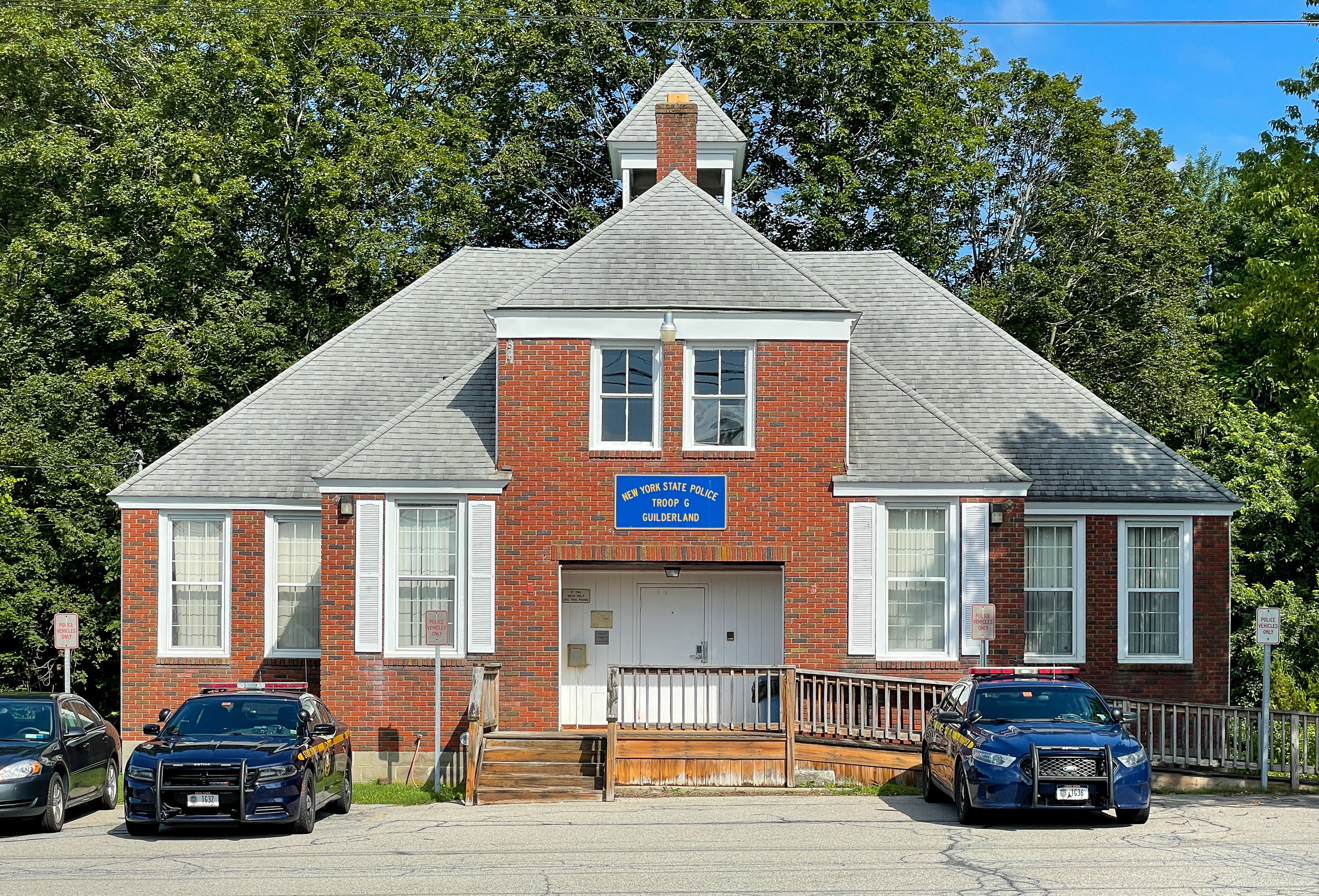
New York State Police building, Guilderland, New York

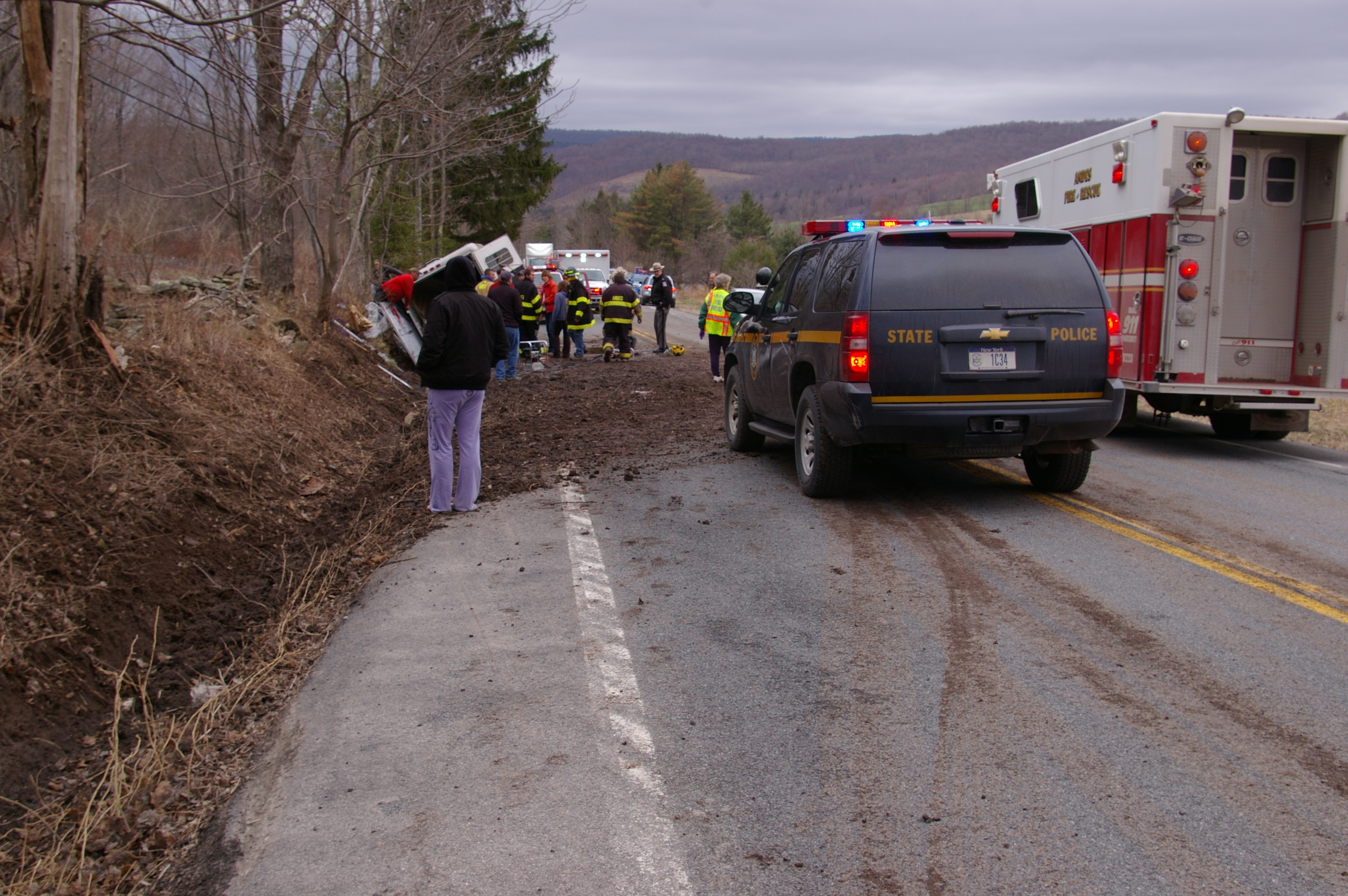
NY State Police unit at the scene of a motor vehicle collision, Delaware County, New York

The NYSP divides New York state geographically into eleven "Troops," each comprising a specific geographic area, usually several counties. Each is supervised by a "Troop Commander" usually of the rank of Major. NYSP Troops cover the following counties and regions:

Troop	Regions covered	Counties covered
A	Buffalo Niagara Region; Eastern Great Lakes Region; Finger Lakes; Genesee Valley; Western New York; Western Southern Tier	Allegany, Cattaraugus, Chautauqua, Erie, Genesee, Niagara, Orleans, Wyoming
B	Adirondack Mountains; Champlain Valley; North Country; Thousand Islands	Clinton, Essex, Franklin, Upper Hamilton, St. Lawrence
C	Catskill Mountains; Central New York Region; Eastern Southern Tier; Finger Lakes; Mohawk Valley region Penn-York Valley	Broome, Chenango, Cortland, Delaware, Otsego, Tioga, Tompkins
D	Central New York; Mohawk Valley region North Country; Tug Hill	Herkimer, Jefferson, Lewis, Madison, Oneida, Onondaga, Oswego
E	Central Southern Tier; Eastern Great Lakes Region; Finger Lakes; Genesee Valley; Western New York	Cayuga, Chemung, Livingston, Monroe, Ontario, Schuyler, Seneca, Steuben, Wayne, Yates
F	Catskill Mountains; Hudson Valley (west) and Highlands; New York metropolitan area	Greene, Orange, Rockland, Sullivan, Ulster
G	Adirondack Mountains; Capital District	Albany, Fulton, Lower Hamilton, Montgomery, Rensselaer, Saratoga, Schenectady, Schoharie, Warren, Washington
K	Hudson Valley (east) and Highlands; New York metropolitan area	Columbia, Dutchess, Putnam, Westchester
L	Long Island; New York metropolitan area	Nassau, Suffolk
NYC	Long Island; New York City; New York metropolitan area	New York City (Bronx, Kings (Brooklyn), New York (Manhattan), Richmond (Staten Island), Queens)
T	Capital District; Catskills; Central New York; Finger Lakes; Hudson Valley (west); New York metropolitan area Western New York	New York State Thruway, (Interstate 84, 1991–2010) (Note: NYSP Troop T was responsible for protecting Interstate 84 from 1991 to 2010 because the New York State Thruway Authority (NYSTA) maintained Interstate 84. However, due to the transfer of maintenance from NYSTA back to the NYSDOT in October 2010, NYSP Troop T no longer patrols Interstate 84 as patrolling duties were reassigned to Troop F and Troop K.)

Each Troop encompasses 4 "Zones" which are referred to simply by a Zone number. There are up to several "sub-stations" located within each zone.

=== Ranks ===
Insignia	Rank
	Superintendent
	First deputy superintendent
	Colonel (deputy superintendent)
	Lieutenant colonel (assistant deputy superintendent)
	Staff inspector
	Major
	Captain
	Lieutenant
	Technical lieutenant
	Chief technical sergeant
	Staff sergeant
	First sergeant
No insignia	Senior investigator (plain clothes)
	Zone sergeant
	Sergeant station commander
	Technical sergeant
	Sergeant
No insignia	Investigator (plain clothes)
No insignia	Trooper

== Uniforms ==
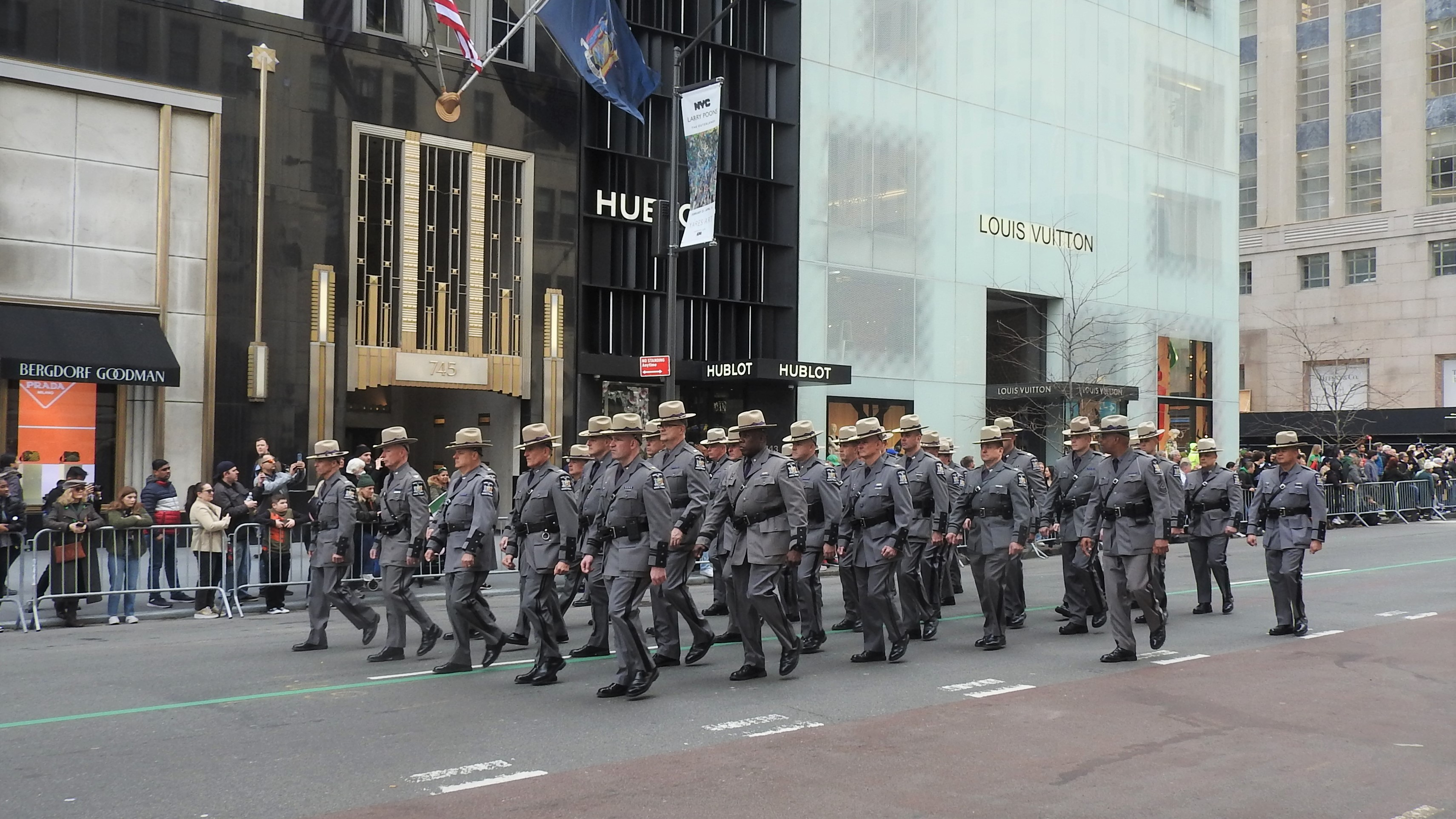
NYSP during a parade

Trooper uniforms are made of grey wool, with the exception of the Gore-Tex jacket. Prior to 1958, uniforms (shirts, jackets and britches) were woven of equal parts white fiber and black fiber to symbolize the impartiality of justice. The NYSP do not wear a badge on their uniform shirts.

== Equipment ==
=== Current equipment ===
Name	Type	Caliber	Origin	Notes
Glock 47	Pistol	9mm	Austria	Equipped with Aimpoint Acro P2 & Streamlight TLR-7 HL-X weapon-mounted light
Remington 870	Shotgun	12 gauge	United States	Standard issue

=== Previously issued equipment ===
- Glock 21 Gen4 .45 ACP (2018–2024)
- Glock 37 .45 GAP (2007–2018)
- Glock 17 9mm (1990–2007)
- Smith & Wesson Model 681 .357 Magnum
- Smith & Wesson Model 13 .357 Magnum
- Smith & Wesson Model 28 .357 Magnum
- Smith & Wesson Model 10 .38 Special

=== Aviation ===
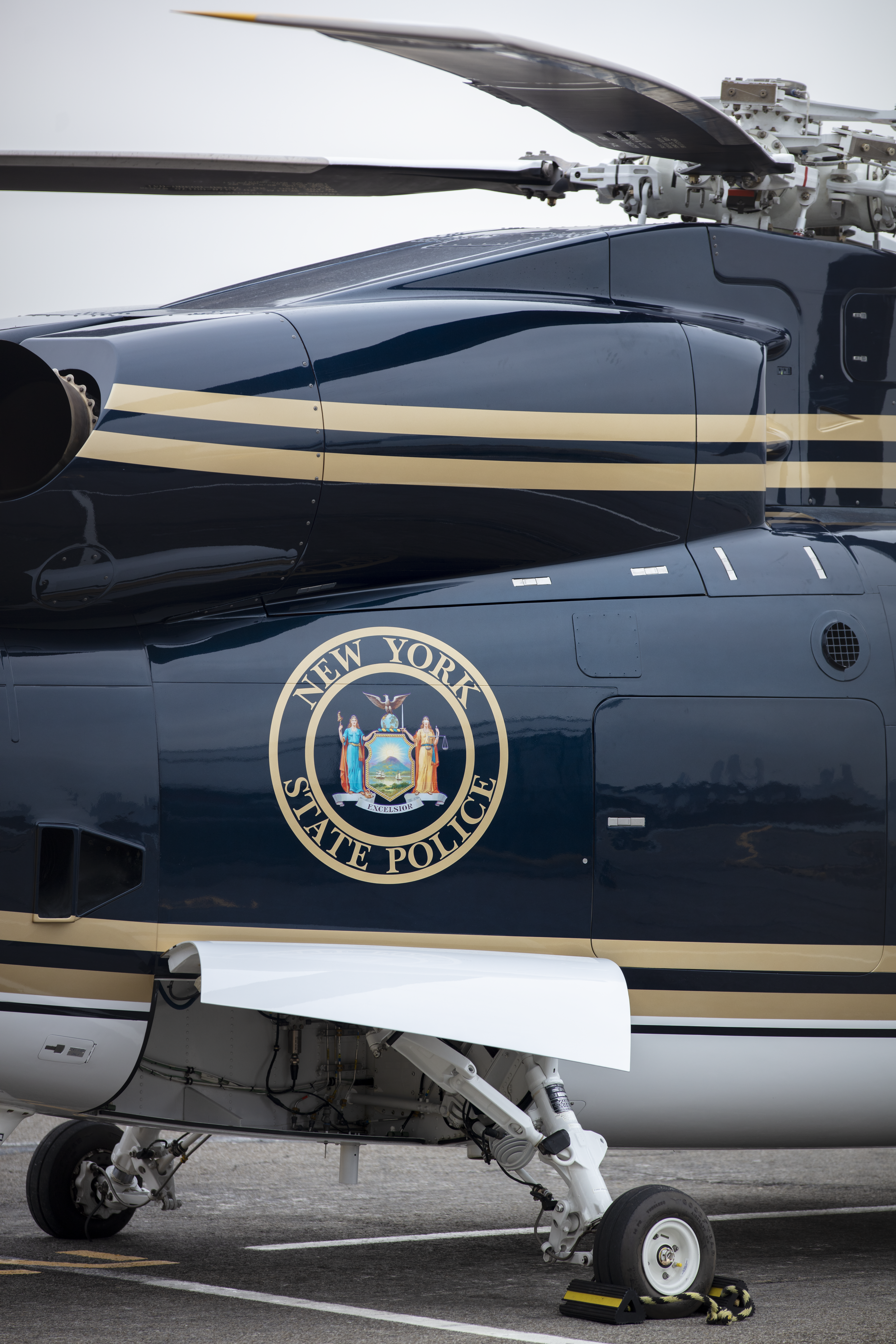
New York State Police helicopter parked at a helipad in New York City, 2020

The New York State Police has three Bell 407 single-engine utility helicopters, six Bell 430 twin engine helicopters, three Bell UH-1 "HUEY 2" single-engine utility helicopters and one UH-1H “HUEY 1” single-engine utility helicopter. Their other aircraft are two Cessna 206 Stationairsingle-e ngine airplanes, one Cessna 172 single-engine airplane, one Partenavia 68 twin-engine observation airplane, one Sikorsky S-76 (used for transporting the governor), and two Beech King Air twin-engine turboprop airplanes. All of these aircraft operate under the call sign "GrayRider". In 2025, New York State Police placed an order for one Airbus H160 and three Airbus H145 helicopters, in addition to two Airbus H145 helicopters ordered in 2024.

== See also ==
- New York State Police Troop C scandal
- List of law enforcement agencies in New York
- New York State University Police
- State police (United States)
- Highway patrol
