= GA20 =

Light aircraft by Guanyi Aviation

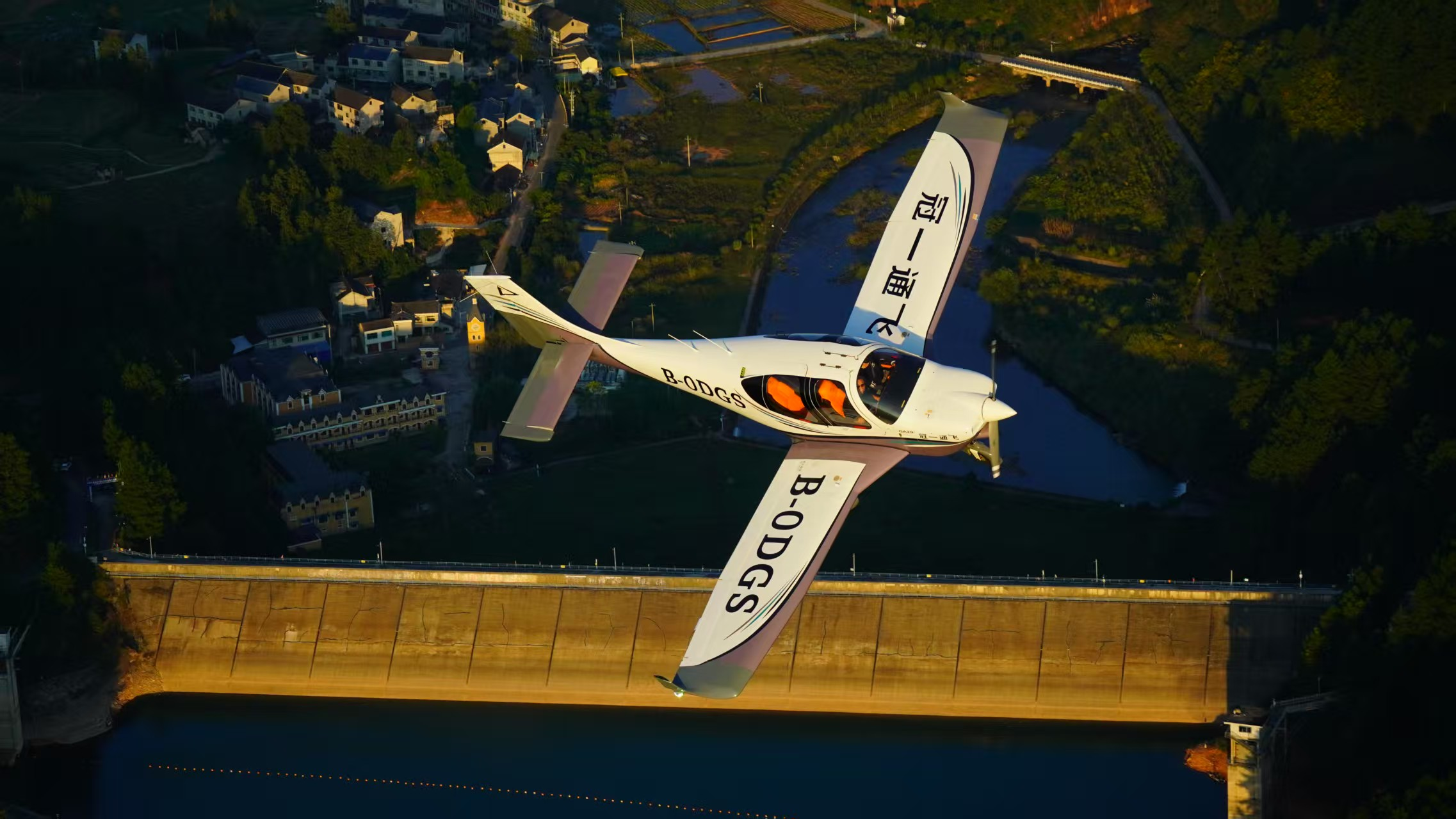

General information
- Type: Light aircraft
- National origin: China
- Manufacturer: Guanyi Aviation
- Status: In production
- Number built: 4

History
- First flight: 19 September 2018

GA20 is a general aviation aircraft type developed by Guanyi Aviation in accordance with CCAR-23/FAR 23/CS-23 standards. Guanyi Aviation is a private company in the aviation industry based in Shanghai, China. The development program commenced in 2015, and the Type Certificate (TC) application was submitted to the Civil Aviation Administration of China (CAAC) in September 2016. After nine years of development and certification work, the GA20 was officially granted its Type Certificate by CAAC on December 2, 2024.

The GA20 is a single-engine, four-seat, fixed-wing aircraft with a wide range of market applications. It can meet diverse operational needs such as airline pilot training, private flying, short-haul passenger transport, and low-altitude sightseeing.

The GA20 is among the first Part23 aircraft type fully self-developed by Chinese private company, domestically designed and certified GA aircraft in China according to China Daily's news report.

== Development ==
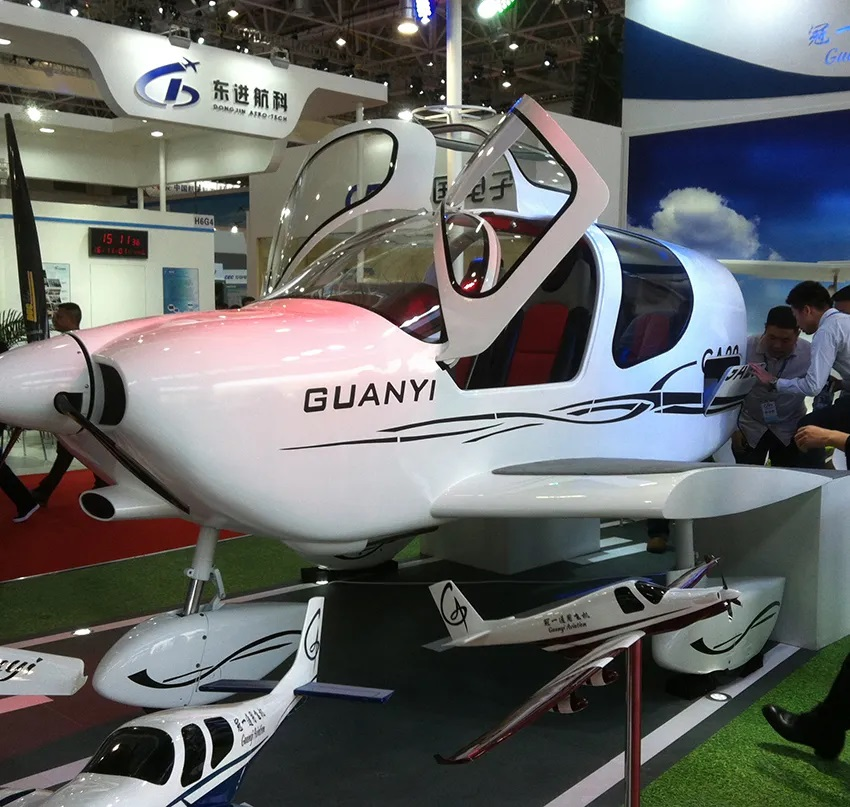
GA20 mockup exhibited at 2016 China airshow

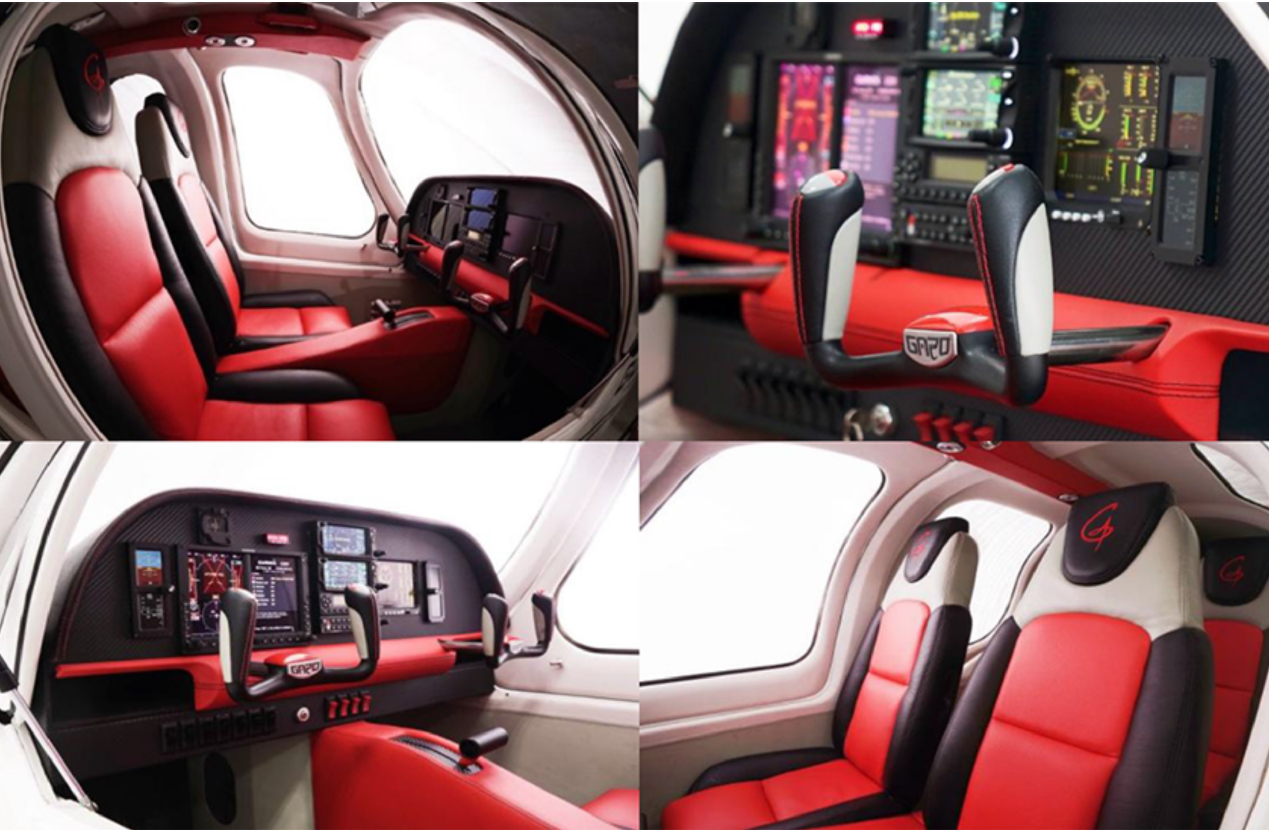
GA20 cockpit mockup

The GA20 program was started in 2015 by Guanyi Aviation. The single-engine, four-seat fixed-wing aircraft was developed for multiple purposes including pilot training, sightseeing and personal flying. A full-scale cockpit mock-up was unveiled at Airshow China 2016 in Zhuhai from November 1–6, 2016. The type certification (TC) application for the GA20 was submitted to the Civil Aviation Administration of China (CAAC) in September 2016, and the authority formally accepted the GA20 TC application in March 2017.

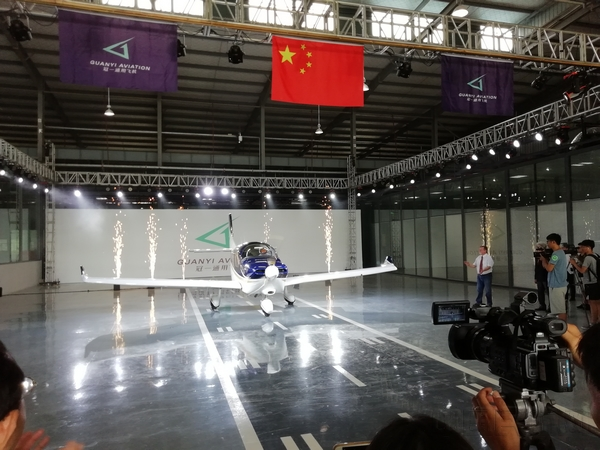
First GA20 prototype production completed

The first GA20 prototype rolled off the production line and demonstrated a runway test. on May 21, 2018, in Nanchang Its maiden flight was performed on September 19, 2018, at the new Yaohu Aerodrome in Nanchang. The flight lasted 26 minutes with a flight altitude of 300 meters. By December 12, 2019, the prototype had completed 100 R&D test flights, covering 23 test subjects including handling qualities, flight performance, takeoff and landing characteristics, maneuverability and system functionality. On November 2–3, 2019, the GA20 performed 4 demonstration flights at the Nanchang Flight Convention for the public.

In 2020, a Sichuan flight training school made an order of intent for 100 GA20s for flight training. The R&D dynamic impact test program for the GA20's seat belts and seats commenced on May 26, 2020, at the Aircraft Strength Research Institute of China. The certification flight test prototype completed its major component manufacturing compliance inspection and entered final assembly on January 15, 2021.

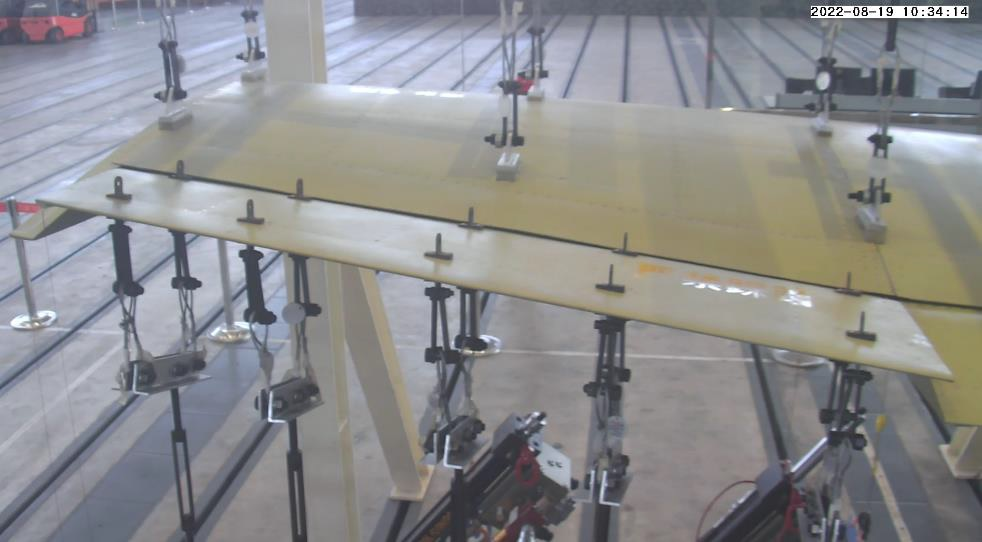
GA20 aileron static test

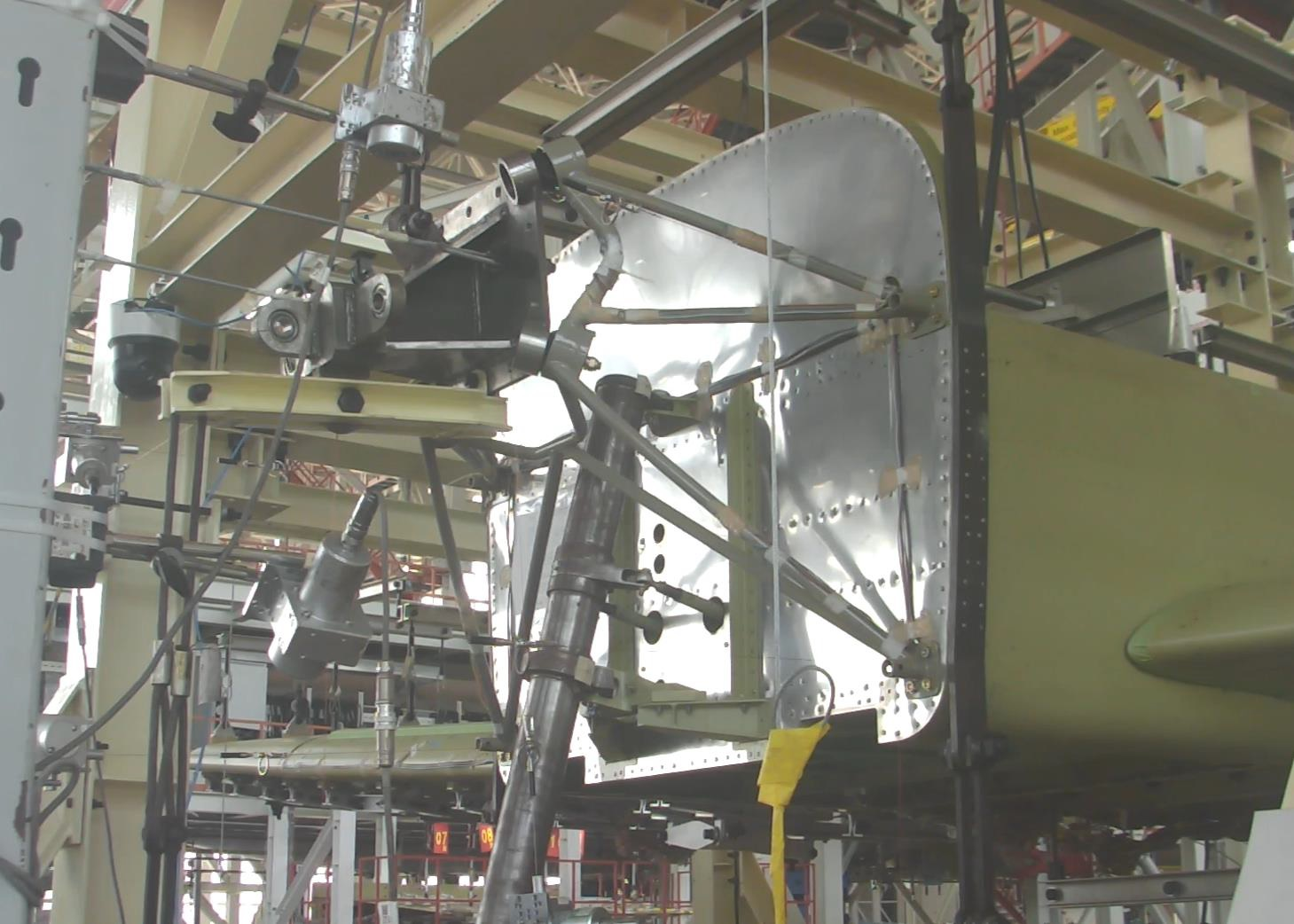
engine mount static test

A third GA20 prototype was produced specifically for static load testing and began its first testing on April 2, 2022. All static structural tests—including limit load and ultimate load cases covering 39 configurations—were completed on April 18, 2023. These structural tests include different loading conditions on the aircraft's structural and control components such as the wings, elevator, rudder, ailerons, and fuselage in accordance with structural compliance requirements. The entire ground structural test took approximately one year.

GA20 structural test

GA20 ground vibration test

Eighteen tests were carried out to test the Integrated Control Unit developed by Guanyi. These tests include low-temperature tests, high-temperature tests, humidity tests, altitude tests, salt spray tests, vibration tests, crash tests, EMI tests, and ESD tests to validate that the integrated control unit's working performance meets the design requirements. The certification flight test of the GA20 began in December 2023 at Guizhou Jiuzhou Airport, covering a wide range of subjects including airspeed systems, avionics systems, propulsion systems, stability, stall and spin, etc.

GA20 Spin test

The spin flight test was completed on April 30, 2023. The spin test lasted half a month to evaluate spin characteristics under different weights, centers of gravity, throttle positions, flap positions, and attitudes. GA20 has a stable aerodynamic design that makes the aircraft hard to enter a spin and easy to exit from one. The certification flight test phase was concluded in August 2023. By then, 226 flight tests had been completed, demonstrating that the aircraft meets all compliance requirements from the aviation authority.

GA20 landing gear drop test

The landing gear of the GA20 is designed and developed by Guanyi Aviation. The landing gear drop test was completed in April 2023. Thirty-nine tests were conducted on the main landing gear and nose landing gear under different drop heights, and under different landing attitude conditions (3-point landing, 2-point landing, tail-down landing, and level landing). After the completion of the drop test, the landing gear static test took place in May 2023, testing and validating the landing gear's structural integrity under lateral load, three-point landing rebound, and three-point landing rotation conditions.

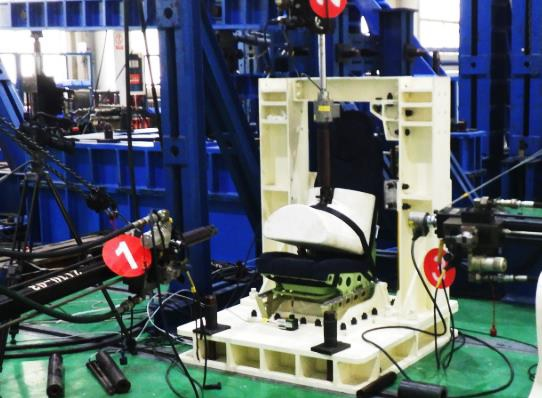
GA20 seat static test

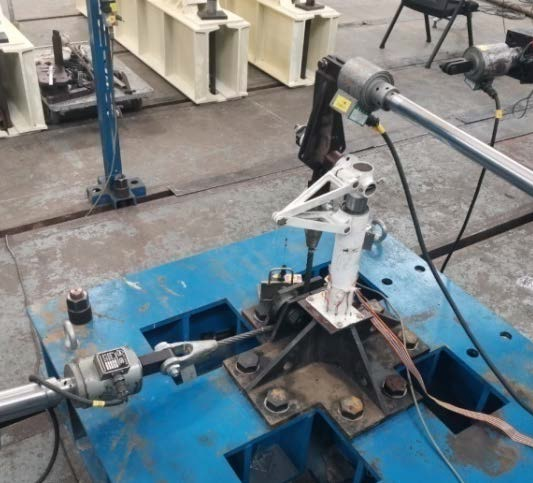
GA20 landing gear static test

GA20 seat impact test

The seats are also designed and developed by Guanyi Aviation. The seat static test, with 22 different test cases covering limit loads, ultimate loads, and different loading directions, was completed in May 2023. The emergency landing dynamic impact test consists of vertical impact tests and horizontal impact tests. The purpose of the test is to ensure adequate protection for pilots and passengers during an emergency landing. Nine vertical tests and three horizontal tests were conducted to validate the seat and seat belt design. The final certification test, the pilot seat horizontal impact test, was completed on August 2, 2023. Type certification from CAAC was awarded on December 2, 2024.

== Design ==
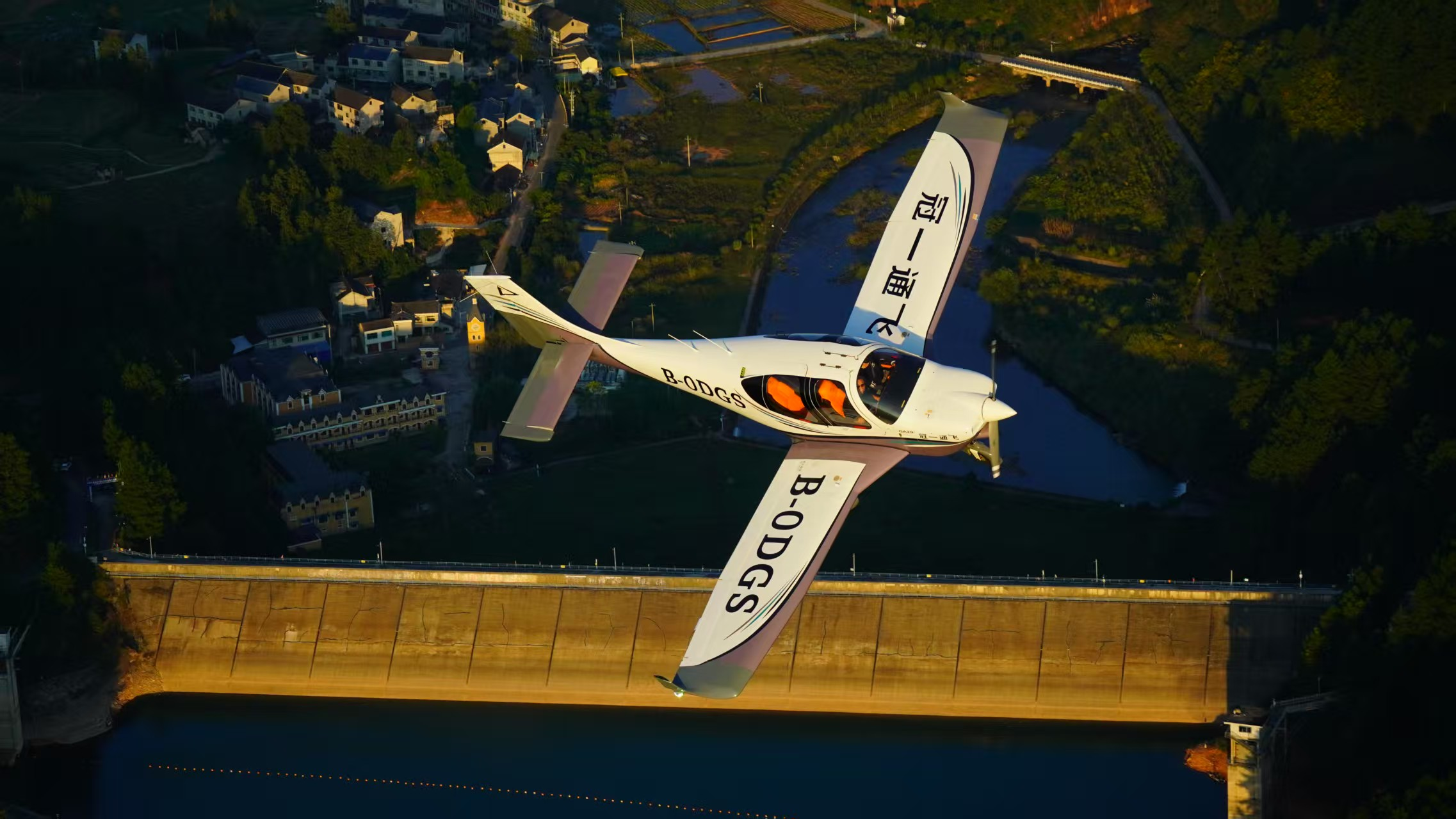
GA20 flight photo

The Guanyi GA20 is a four-seat, low-wing, mainly metal light aircraft intended for flight training and private flight. It features a semi-monocoque aluminum alloy structure with composite components on the engine fairings, winglets, and tailplane. The twisted wing uses a NACA 43013.5 root - 43012 tip airfoil with mild taper at the outboard sections and small winglets. The tail unit consists of a low-mounted horizontal stabilizer and a swept vertical fin.

The aircraft has fixed tricycle landing gear with oleo-pneumatic shock absorbers, a steerable nosewheel, and hydraulic disc brakes. Power is provided by a 119 kW (160 hp) Lycoming O-320 engine driving a two-blade fixed-pitch Sensenich propeller, with optional Continental CD-170 or Lycoming IO-390 engines paired with constant-speed composite propellers. Fuel is stored in two wing tanks with a total capacity of 156 litres (41 US gal).

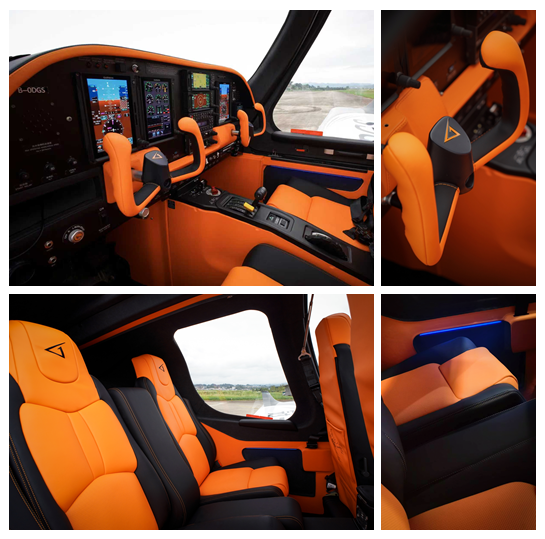
GA20 internal

Flight controls are conventional and manually operated, with push-pull rods for the ailerons, elevator, and rudder, while flaps and trim systems are electrically actuated. The electrical system includes two main buses and two batteries.

The GA20 features a Garmin glass-cockpit avionics suite, centered on a G500 TXi integrated touchscreen flight display that provides primary flight display, navigation, communication, and engine monitoring functions. The system supports GPS, VOR, and ADS-B capabilities, and includes dual communication radios, digital audio management, and an emergency locator transmitter.

== Specifications ==
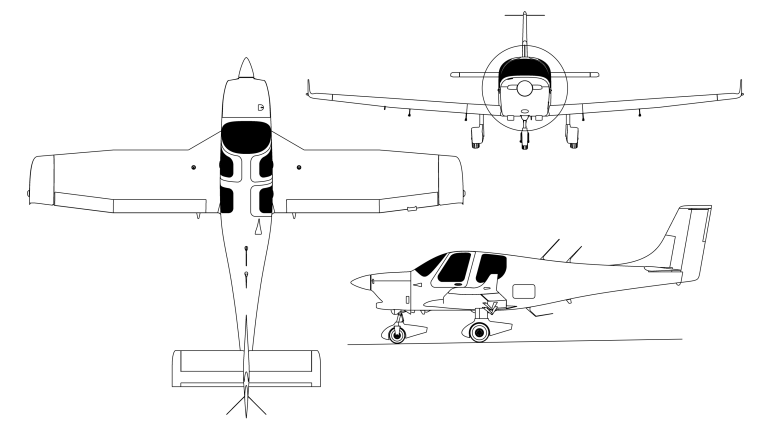
3 views of GA20

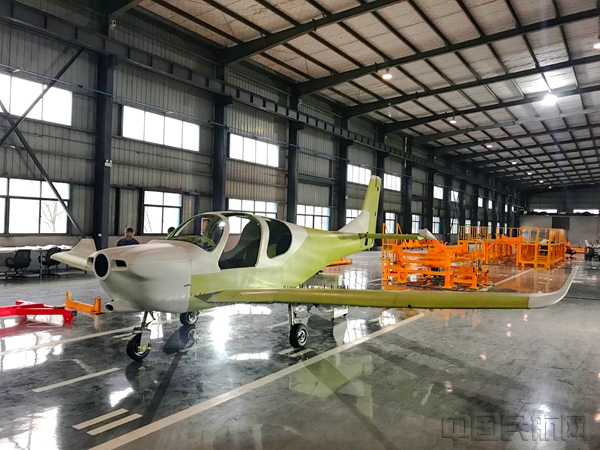
GA20 during final assembly

Data from Guanyi Aviation

General characteristics

- Crew: 1 pilot
- Capacity: 3 passengers
- Length: 26 ft 7 in (8.10 m)
- Wingspan: 32 ft 2 in (9.80 m)
- Height: 9 ft 6 in (2.90 m)
- Wing area: 150 sq ft (14 m^{2})
- Aspect ratio: 6.9
- Airfoil: NACA43013.5 root - 43012 tip
- Empty weight: 1,521 lb (690 kg)
- Gross weight: 2,447 lb (1,110 kg)
- Powerplant: 1 × Lycoming O-320 six cylinder, horizontally-opposed piston aircraft engine, 160 hp (120 kW)
- Propellers: 2-bladed

Performance

- Cruise speed: 130 kn (150 mph, 240 km/h) TAS
- Stall speed: 48 kn (55 mph, 89 km/h) CAS
- Range: 648 nmi (746 mi, 1,200 km)
- Service ceiling: 13,000 ft (4,000 m)
- Rate of climb: 726 ft/min (3.69 m/s)

Avionics

- Garmin G500 TXi glass cockpit

== See also ==
- TB9
- TB10
- DA20
- SR22
- Cessna 172
