= Limit load =

Limit load can refer to:

- Limit load (aeronautics), the maximum load factor during flight
- Limit load (physics), maximum load that a structure can safely carry

== See also ==
- Total maximum daily load, regulatory term in the U.S. Clean Water Act, describing a plan for restoring impaired waters
