= Flying club =

Member-run non-profit organization for aircraft access

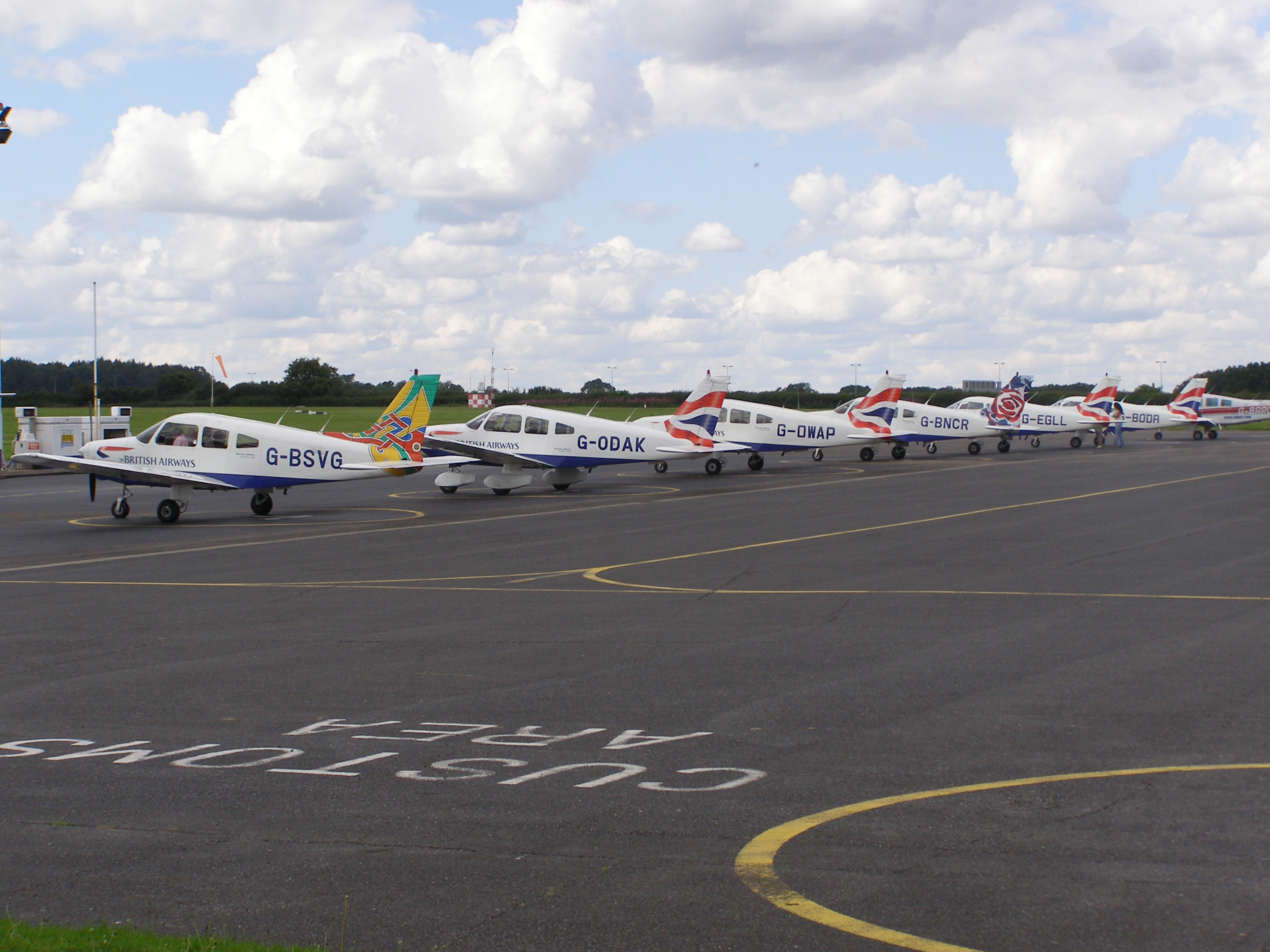
Piper Cherokees of the British Airways flying club at Booker Airfield, United Kingdom. Two aircraft are painted in the World Tails livery.

A flying club or aero club is a not-for-profit, member-run organization that provides its members with affordable access to aircraft.

Many clubs also provide flight training, flight planning facilities, pilot supplies and associated services, as well as organizing social functions, fly-ins and fly-outs to other airports and so forth. While flying clubs are home to those who pursue flying as a hobby, many commercial pilots also get their start at flying clubs.

Most flying clubs own and rent small general aviation aircraft. In North America and Europe the most popular such aircraft are the Cessna 152, the Cessna 172, and the Piper Cherokee. However some clubs also exist to provide access to more specialized aircraft, such as vintage planes, aerobatic planes, helicopters and gliders.

In Canada, however, the clubs can be fairly large non-profit operations, some dating back to the 1920s and operating at large airports as well as small. Canadian flying clubs often serve as fixed-base operators at their airports as well as flight schools and aircraft renters.

== See also ==
- Category:Flying clubs, a list of flying clubs with Wikipedia articles
- OpenAirplane
