= Limit theorem =

Limit theorem may refer to:

- Central limit theorem, in probability theory
- Edgeworth's limit theorem, in economics
- Plastic limit theorems, in continuum mechanics
