= Private jets =

Private jets may refer to:

- Private jet, a small airplane usually for business
- Private aviation, non-commercial aviation
