= EASA CS-VLA =

European Aviation Safety Agency certification specification for very light aircraft

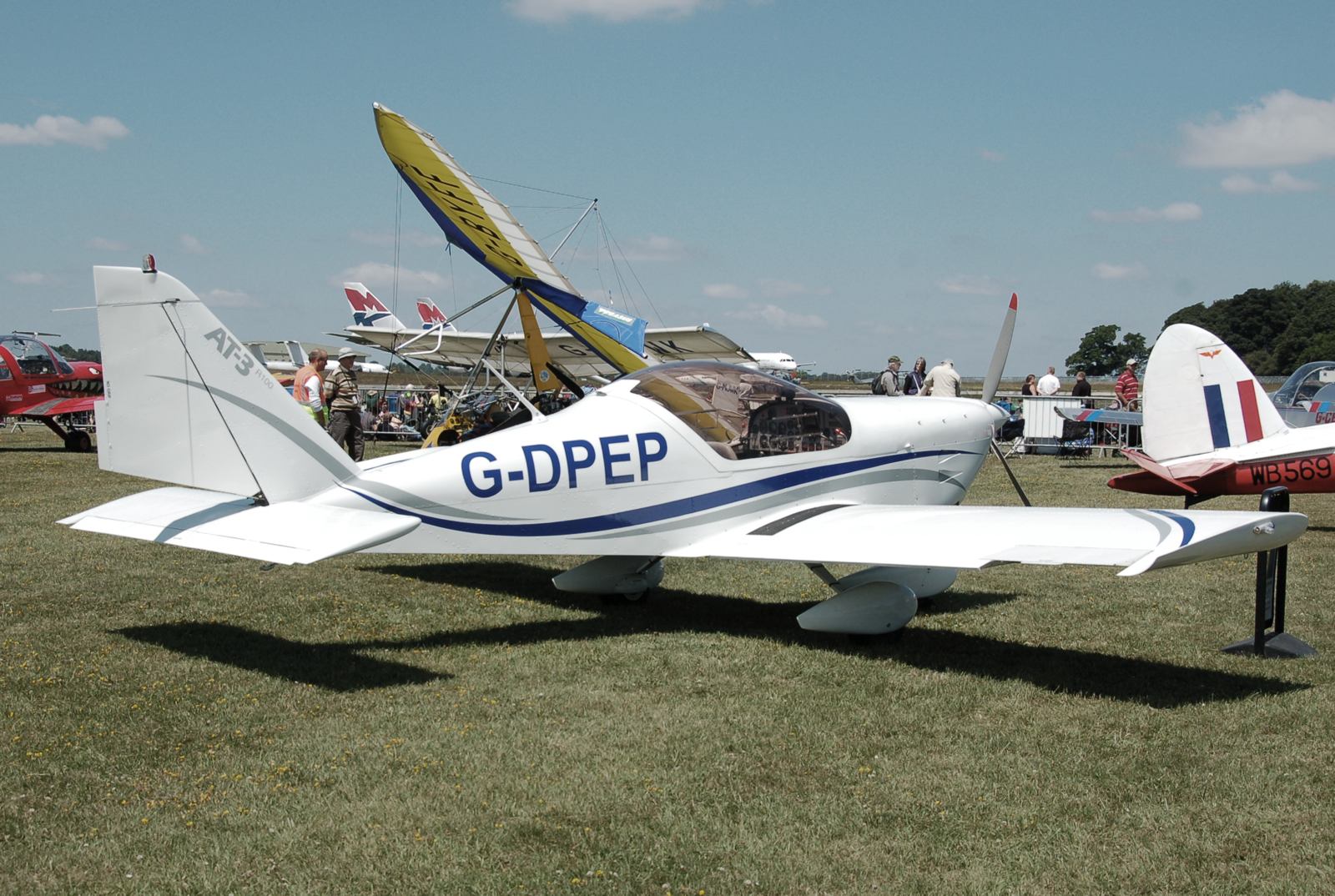
The Aero AT-3 R100 is an EASA Very Light Aircraft certified two-seater rated with 582 kg max takeoff weight, a 75 kW engine, 200 km/h cruise speed and 904 km range

EASA CS-VLA is the European Aviation Safety Agency Certification Specification for Very Light Aircraft.

The Very Light Aircraft (VLA) aircraft certification category introduced in 2003 by the European Aviation Safety Agency (EASA) is intended to make it easier and less costly to get full European certification, operation and maintenance of a general aviation aircraft. The somewhat relaxed certification procedure is available for aircraft satisfying the following criteria:

- Maximum take-off weight (MTOW) of not more than 750 kg
- One or two seats maximum
- Maximum Stall speed in the landing configuration (V_{S0}) of no more than 83 km/h (45 knots)
- Approved only for day-VFR visual flight rules conditions
- Certified in the Normal Category only, all aerobatics maneuvers including intentional spinning are prohibited

The main part of professional pilots training is done on EASA CS-23 specification, which also allows for flying under IFR and NVFR conditions.

== See also ==
- Light-sport aircraft
- EASA CS-LSA, the European certification for Light Sport Aeroplanes (maximum 600 for land / 650 kg for seaplanes)
- EASA CS-23, Normal, Utility, Aerobatic and Commuter Aeroplanes
- EASA CS-25, the European certification for large turbine-powered aircraft (no maximum mass specified)
