= Martin XB-51 =

American bomber/attack aircraft prototype

XB-51
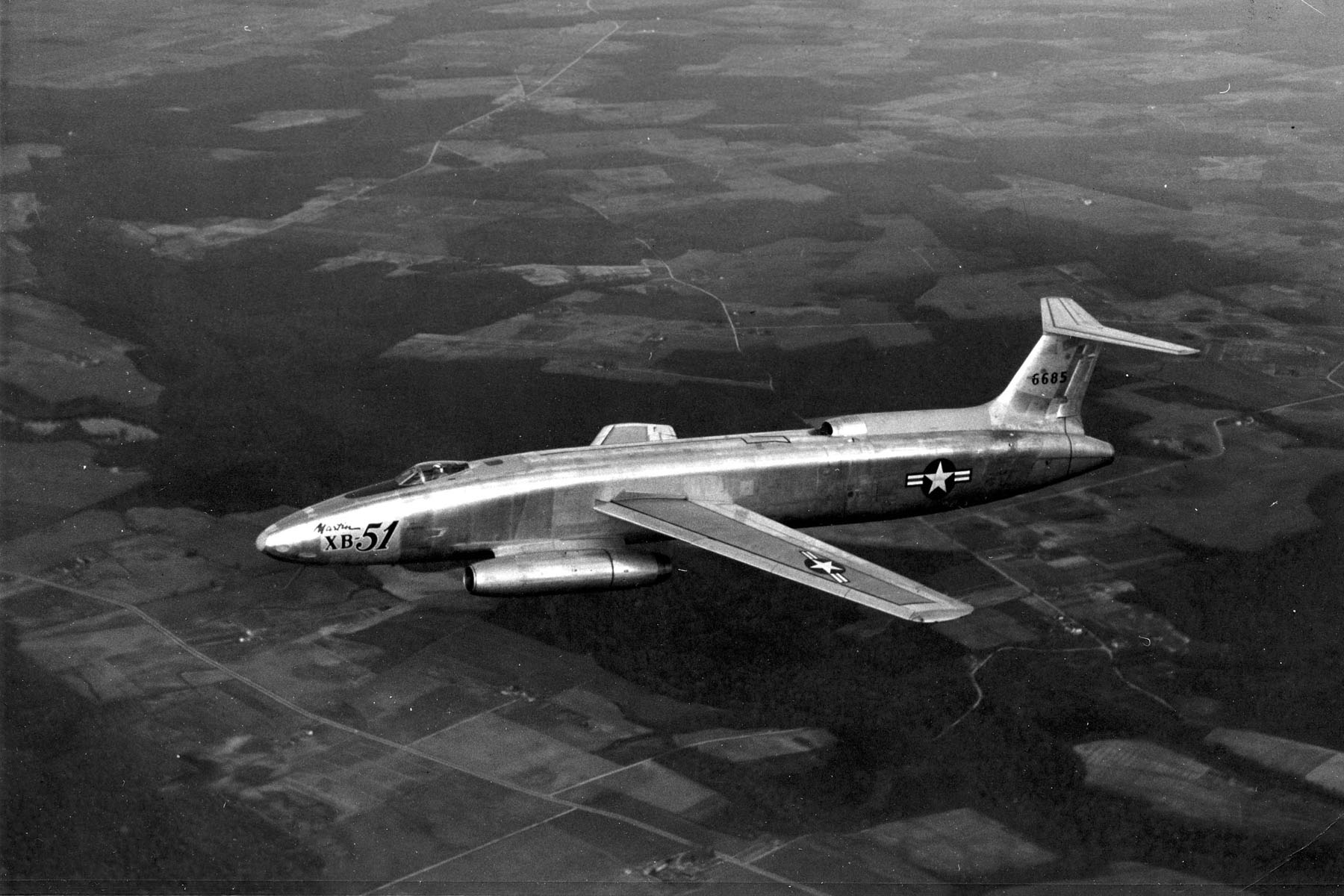
- First prototype, 46-685 during testing

General information
- Type: Bomber
- Manufacturer: Glenn L. Martin Company
- Status: Canceled in 1952
- Primary user: United States Air Force
- Number built: 2

History
- First flight: 28 October 1949
- Retired: 25 March 1956

The Martin XB-51 was an American trijet ground-attack aircraft. It was designed in 1945 and made its maiden flight in 1949. It was originally designed as a bomber for the United States Army Air Forces under specification V-8237-1 and was designated XA-45. The "A" ground-attack classification was eliminated the next year, and the XB-51 designation was assigned instead. The requirement was for low-level bombing and close support. The XB-51 lost out in evaluation to the English Electric Canberra which — built by Martin — entered service as the Martin B-57 Canberra.

== Design and development ==
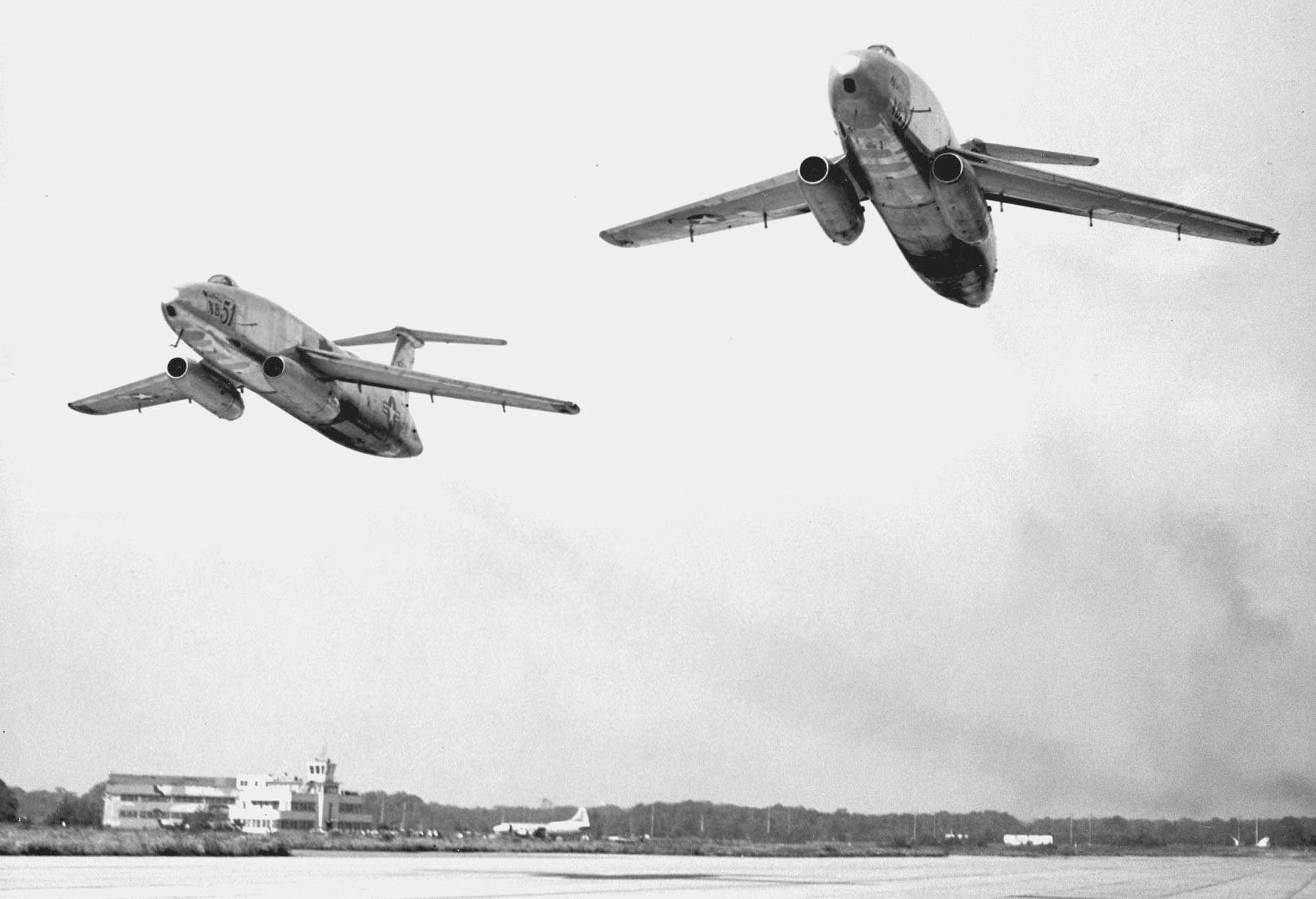
Martin's two XB-51 prototypes, seen low over the runway on a high-speed pass

This unorthodox design, first flying on 28 October 1949, was fitted with three General Electric J47 engines — an unusual number for a combat aircraft — two underneath the forward fuselage in pods, and one at the extreme tail with the intake at the base of the tailfin. The innovative, variable incidence wings, swept at 35° and with 6° anhedral, were equipped with leading edge slats and full-width flaps. Spoilers gave most of the roll control and undersized ailerons provided feel for the pilot. The combination of variable incidence and slotted flaps gave a shorter takeoff run. Four 954 lb (4.24 kN) thrust Rocket-Assisted Take Off (RATO) bottles with a 14-second burn duration could be fitted to the rear fuselage to improve takeoff performance. Spectacular launches were a feature of later test flights.

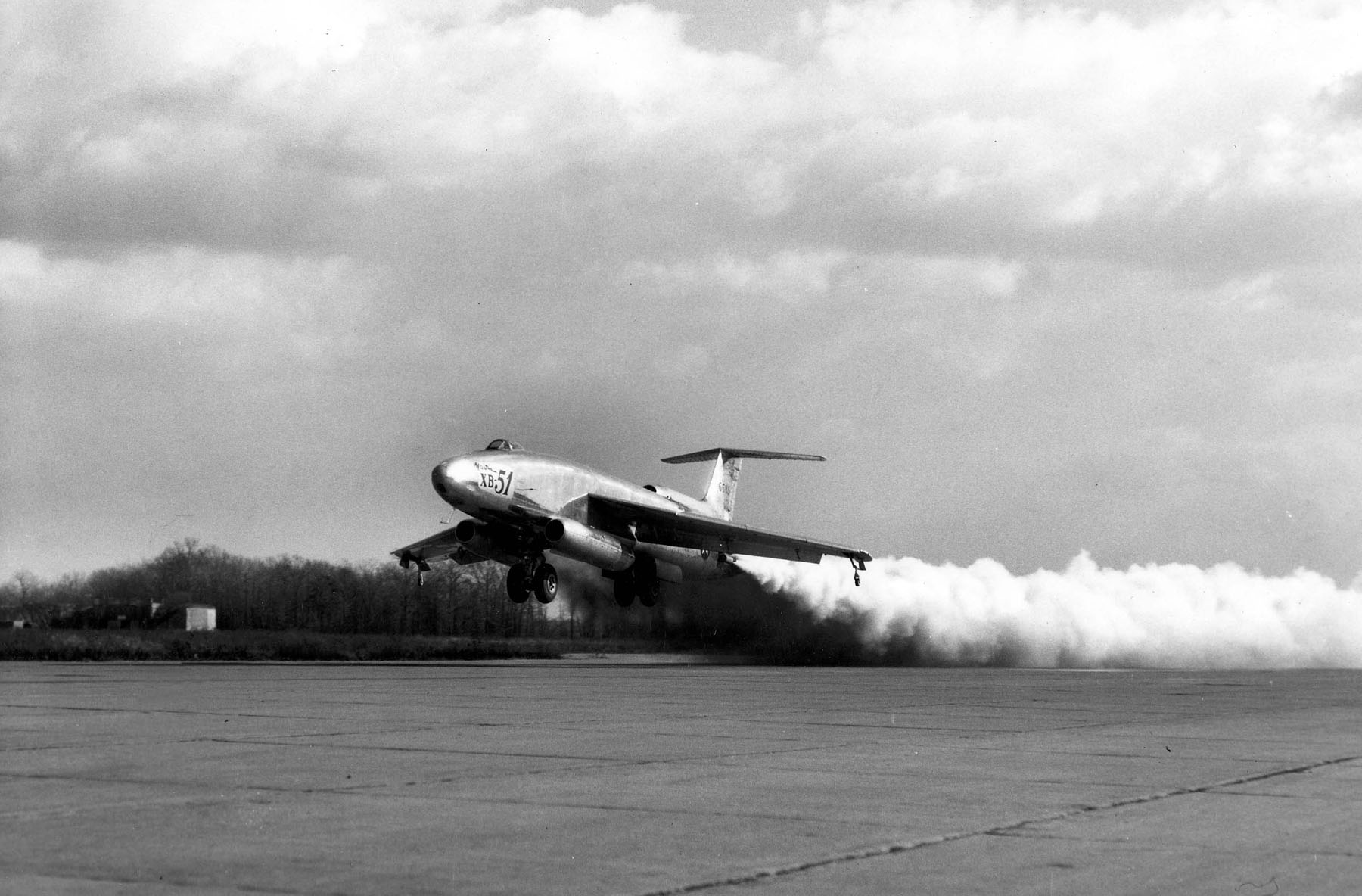
Testing RATO

The main landing gear consisted of dual wheel sets in tandem in the fuselage, similar to the Boeing B-47 Stratojet, with outrigger wheels at the wingtips (originally proved on a modified Martin B-26 Marauder named "Middle River Stump Jumper"). The XB-51 was a large but aerodynamically "clean" design which incorporated nearly all major systems internally. The aircraft was fitted with a rotating bomb bay, a Martin trademark; bombs could also be carried externally up to a maximum load of 10,400 lb (4,717 kg), although the specified basic mission required only a 4,000 lb (1,814 kg) bombload. Eight 20 mm cannon mounted in the nose would have been installed in production aircraft.

There were two crew in a shared cockpit. A pilot sat forward under a fighter-type bubble canopy. A Short-Range Navigation (SHORAN) navigation and bombing system operator sat lower down and to the rear, with only a small observation window. The cockpit was a pressurized, air-conditioned environment, equipped with upward-firing ejection seats. The XB-51 was the first Martin aircraft equipped with ejection seats, these being of their own design.

== Operational history ==
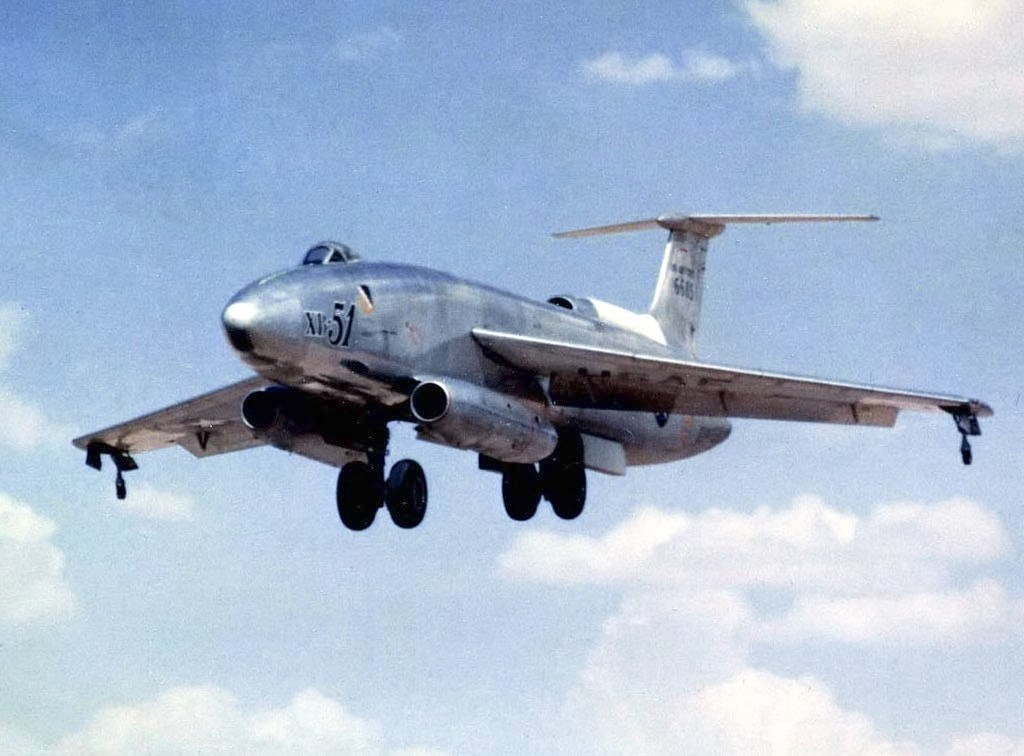
46-685 on approach

In 1950, the United States Air Force issued a new requirement based on early Korean War experience for a night intruder/bomber to replace the Douglas A-26 Invader. The XB-51 was entered, as well as the Avro Canada CF-100 and English Electric Canberra; the XB-51 and Canberra emerged from these as the favorites.

Test flights showed the XB-51 to be highly maneuverable at low altitudes and substantially faster than the Canberra and faster than most fighter aircraft of the era. However, the XB-51's endurance was significantly lower than that of the Canberra and this factor was decisive in its cancellation. In addition, a load limiting factor of only 3.67 g (36 m/s^{2}) meant that the general strength of the airframe was relatively low and would prevent tight turns while fully loaded. Additionally, the tandem main gear plus outriggers of the XB-51 were thought unsuitable for the requirement to fly from emergency forward airfields.

While the XB-51 was not selected for procurement, it was decided that Martin would build 250 Canberras under license, under the designation B-57. Furthermore, Martin's rotating bomb bay would be incorporated into production variants of the B-57. A "Super Canberra", incorporating other XB-51 features, such as swept wings and tail-planes, was also proposed. This aircraft – although it promised much better speed and performance than the B-57 – never reached the prototype stage, mainly because the many changes would have taken too long to implement and test, before it could be put into production.

Flights by the XB-51 prototype, 46-685, continued, for general research purposes, following the project's official cancellation by the USAF. A second prototype, 46-686, which first flew in 1950, crashed during low-level aerobatics on 9 May 1952, killing pilot Major Neil H. Lathrop. 46-685 continued to fly, including an appearance in the film Toward the Unknown as the "Gilbert XF-120" fighter. (Note: A few seconds of test flight footage of an XB-51 also appeared in the 1951 Tales of Tomorrow episode "Plague From Space". Note: Although the XB-51 did not receive an official name, "Panther" had been suggested by the company.) The surviving prototype was en route to Eglin AFB to shoot additional footage when it crashed during takeoff, following a refueling stop in El Paso, Texas, on 25 March 1956.

== Specifications (XB-51) ==
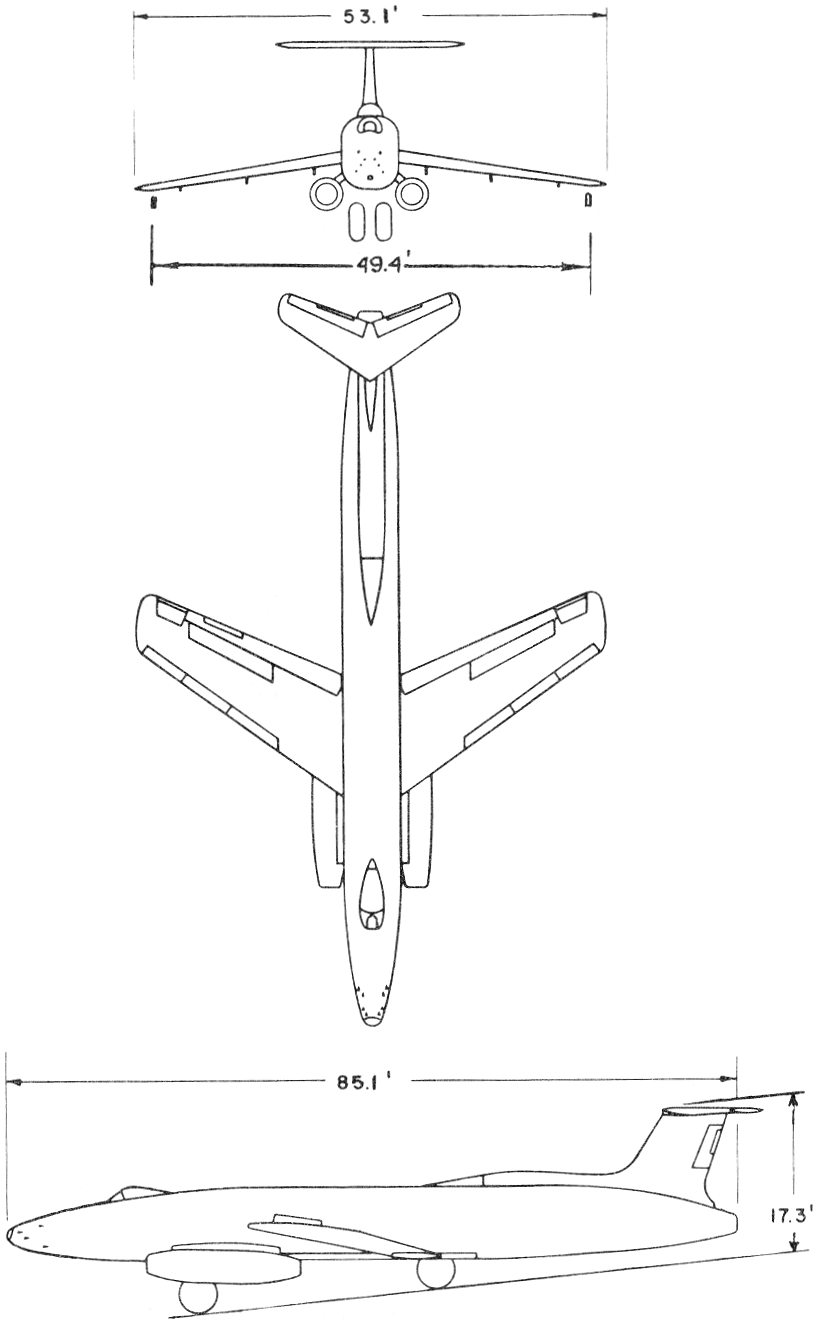
3-view line drawing of the Martin XB-51

Data from U.S.Standard Aircraft Characteristics

General characteristics

- Crew: 2
- Length: 85 ft 1 in (25.93 m)
- Wingspan: 53 ft 1 in (16.18 m)
- Height: 17 ft 4 in (5.28 m)
- Wing area: 548 sq ft (50.9 m^{2})
- Airfoil: NACA 63A010
- Empty weight: 30,906 lb (14,019 kg)
- Gross weight: 57,874 lb (26,251 kg)
- Max takeoff weight: 62,452 lb (28,328 kg)
- Powerplant: 3 × General Electric J47-GE-13 turbojet engines, 5,200 lbf (23 kN) thrust each

Performance

- Maximum speed: 644 mph (1,036 km/h, 560 kn)
- Range: 1,075 mi (1,730 km, 934 nmi)
- Ferry range: 1,444 mi (2,324 km, 1,255 nmi)
- Service ceiling: 41,750 ft (12,730 m)
- Rate of climb: 6,600 ft/min (34 m/s)
- Wing loading: 105.6 lb/sq ft (516 kg/m^{2})
- Thrust/weight: 0.27

Armament

- Guns: 8 × 20 mm M24 cannon (0.79 in) cannon with 1,280 rounds
- Rockets: 8 × High Velocity Aerial Rockets (HVAR) or
- Bombs: Up to 10,400 lb (4,720 kg) carried internally

== See also ==
Aircraft of comparable role, configuration, and era

- Douglas A3D Skywarrior
- Douglas B-66 Destroyer
- English Electric Canberra
- Sud Aviation Vautour
- Ilyushin Il-28
- Yakovlev Yak-25
- Yakovlev Yak-28

Related lists

- List of attack aircraft
- List of bomber aircraft
- List of military aircraft of the United States
