= EASA CS-25 =

Certification procedure

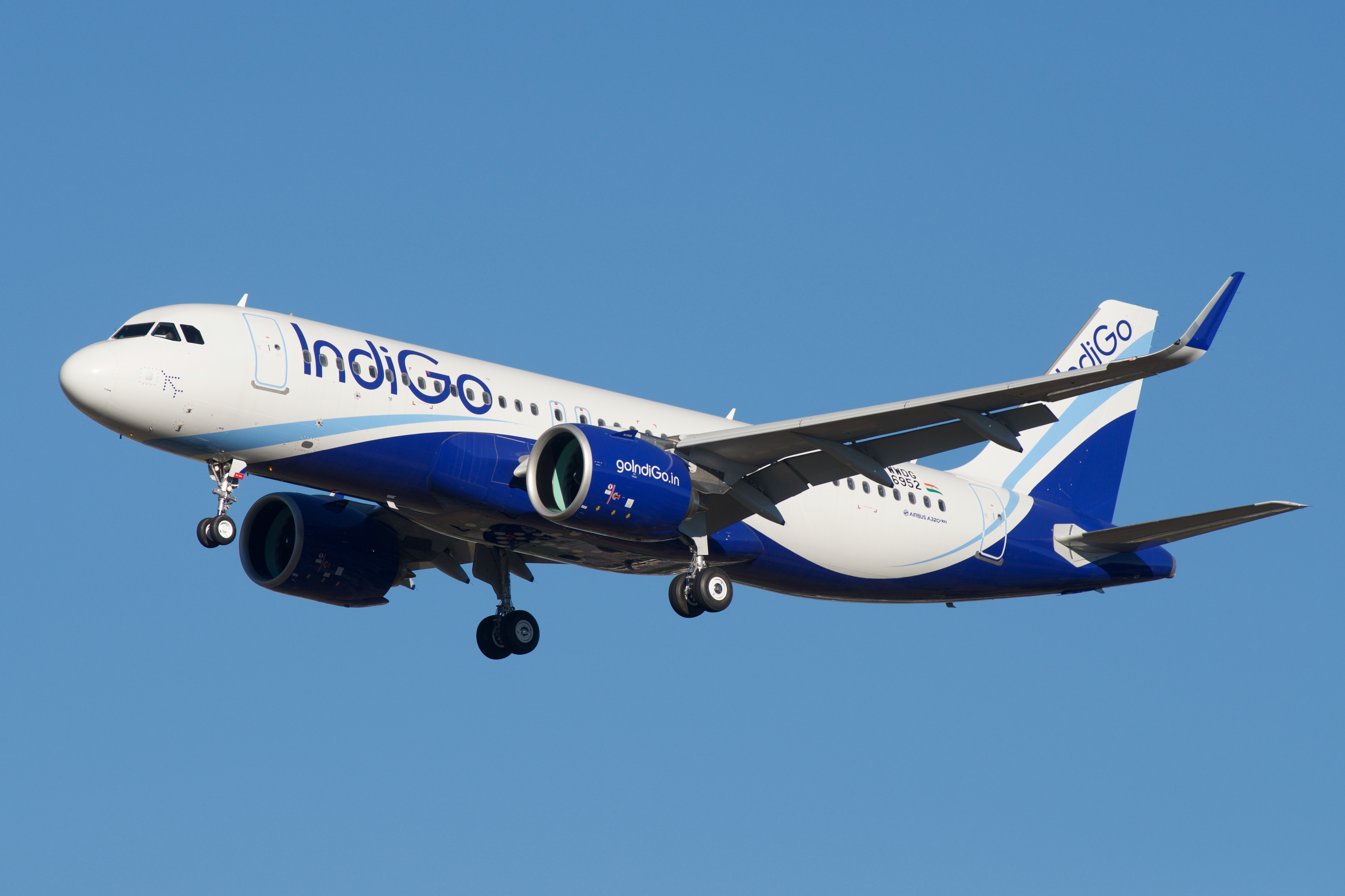
An Airbus A320neo

EASA CS-25 is the European Union Aviation Safety Agency Certification Specifications for turbine powered Large Aeroplanes.

This certification procedure applies to large, turbine-powered aircraft, with max take-off weight of more than 5,700kg (CS 25.1).

It describes the minimum requirements that must be met for the certification of an aircraft in this class. After the compliance with all applicable requirements has been demonstrated, the EASA issues a type certificate. Manufacturers may apply for deviations or Equivalent Safety Findings from CS-25 where necessary.

Certification Specifications are "soft law", which is not legally binding. As such, the Certification Specifications are directly updated by the EASA, without the need for a vote of the European Parliament.

== See also ==
- List of large aircraft
- List of current production certified light aircraft
- EASA CS-LSA, the European certification for Light Sport Aeroplanes (maximum 600 for land / 650 kg for seaplanes)
- EASA CS-VLA, the European certification for Very Light Aircraft (maximum 750 kg)
- EASA CS-23, Normal, Utility, Aerobatic and Commuter Aeroplanes
- EASA CS-27, Small Rotorcraft
- EASA CS-29, Large Rotorcraft
- Federal Aviation Regulations § Part 25
- Transport category
