= Tecnam P2012 Traveller =

Italian utility aircraft

P2012 Traveller
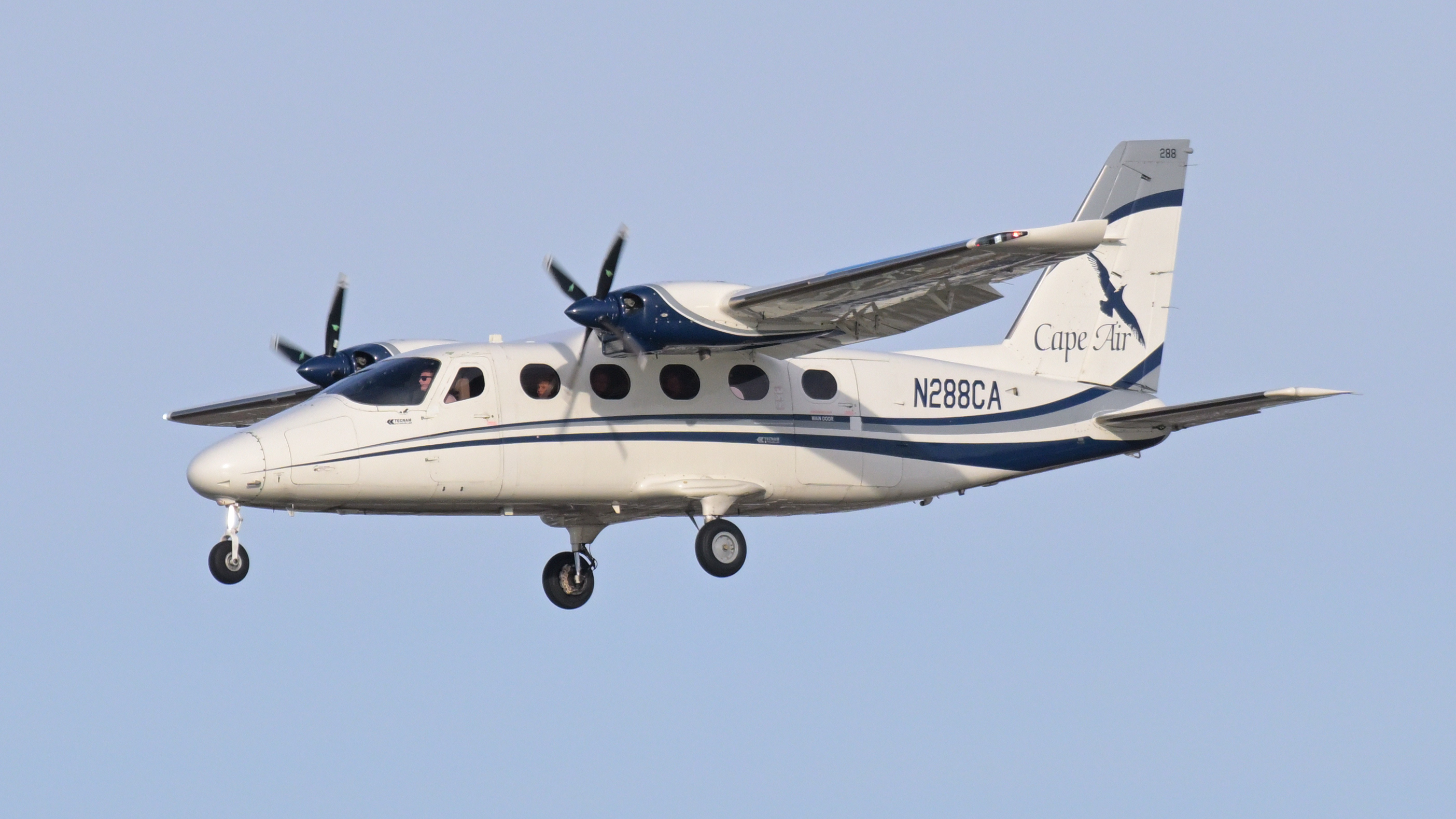
- A Cape Air Tecnam P2012

General information
- Role: Utility aircraft
- National origin: Italy
- Manufacturer: Tecnam
- Designer: Luigi Pascale
- Primary users: Cape Air: FLN Frisia Luftverkehr; APEX flight academy; Pago Wings; Pacific Air Charters
- Number built: 120

History
- Introduction date: 22 February 2020
- First flight: 21 July 2016
- In service: 2020–present

The Tecnam P2012 Traveller is a twin-engine, shoulder-wing utility aircraft designed and manufactured by the Italian company Costruzioni Aeronautiche Tecnam, based in Capua, Italy, near Naples. Certified under EASA CS-23 and FAA FAR Part 23, the aircraft is configured to carry up to nine passengers and one or two pilots, and is designed for commuter, charter, air taxi, cargo, medevac, and surveillance operations.

In 2009, the U.S. regional airline Cape Air, based in Massachusetts, approached Tecnam with a request for a modern replacement for its aging fleet of Cessna 402s. The project was publicly revealed in April 2011. In November 2015, Cape Air signed a letter of intent to order 100 aircraft. On 21 July 2016, the first prototype performed its maiden flight. In October 2018, testing had been completed, and type certification from European Aviation Safety Agency was received on 20 December 2018. The first customer delivery occurred during March 2019. American Federal Aviation Administration certification was awarded in August 2019, and Cape Air received its first two aircraft via transatlantic ferry flight in October 2019.

The P2012 Traveller marked Tecnam’s first commercial aircraft project. As of 2024, Tecnam can produce up to 40 P2012 per year and has delivered over 120 units worldwide.

== Development ==
In 2009, Cape Air, a Massachusetts-based commuter airline operating in the Caribbean and New England, was looking for a successor for its fleet of 83 Cessna 402s. After being rebuffed by aircraft manufacturers Cessna and Piper, Cape Air approached Italian manufacturer Tecnam, specialised in trainers and private aircraft to develop a modern twin-engine commuter tailored to its operational needs. The P2012 is Tecnam's most complex and important programme, "the first time we've developed an aircraft from the operator's point of view".

The program, overseen by Tecnam’s co-founder and chief engineer Prof. Luigi Pascale, was publicly unveiled at AERO Friedrichshafen in April 2011. It was privately funded with additional support from the Italian government.

On 1 April 2016, the first completed prototype was rolled out. It conducted its maiden flight on 21 July 2016. By April 2017, the first prototype was flown more than 100 hours while the second was set to join during September, targeting a December 2018 certification. The nearly production standard second prototype seats up to nine passengers and conducted its first flight on 22 December 2017; by then the first prototype had flown more than 250 hours.

By August 2018, certification was on track for the year end with 400 hours flown, while the backlog attained 130 and three aircraft were in production. In October 2018, testing was completed after 500 flight hours between the two prototypes. After 600 hours flown by the two prototypes, European type certification was awarded on 20 December 2018, including in icing conditions; approval from the US authority was expected to follow shortly.

The first example was handed over in March 2019. The aircraft was ferried across the Atlantic by Tecnam's Managing Director, Giovanni Pascale, personally piloting the flight to Cape Air's headquarters, marking the type's first transatlantic crossing. In July, Boeing was selected as the sole provider of aftermarket spare parts and distribution services through its Aviall distribution network. By then, Cape Air accepted the first two P2012, the last milestone before final delivery, after having reviewed their manuals, inspected and flight tested them. The FAA granted its type approval on 11 July, while Cape Air awaits airworthiness certifications for each individual aircraft. On 16 October, 30 years after Cape Air's first flight, the company unveiled its first two aircraft, intending to deploy them in early December on revenue flights. Zil Air in Mahe, Seychelles, received its first P2012 on 29 November 2019.

On 22 February 2020, Cape Air started revenue service from Hyannis, Massachusetts, to Nantucket Island, initially operating five aircraft while four more were being ferried in late February. The airline evaluated their performance in New England before operating it from Marion, Illinois, to Nashville and St Louis from 4 March. In April 2021, Cape Air introduced the P2012 in Montana, beginning scheduled flights from Wolf Point to Billings. The aircraft has since replaced the aging Cessna 402 on several Montana routes, including Glasgow, Sidney, Glendive, and Havre. As of 2024, Cape Air operates 30 Tecnam P2012 Travellers, progressively replacing its legacy fleet. While some Cessna 402s remain in limited use, the P2012 has become the backbone of the airline’s fleet across New England, the Midwest, the Caribbean, and Micronesia.

Tecnam also developed the P2012 Sentinel SMP, a special mission platform equipped with sensor bays and long-endurance systems for roles including surveillance, mapping, and maritime patrol. The first two units began sensor integration in late 2022.

In the following years, Tecnam expanded the P2012 family with several new variants. The P2012 STOL variant was publicly introduced in 2022 and received EASA certification in March 2024. This version, equipped with 375 hp Continental GTSIO-520-S engines and extended wings, was designed for operations on short and unprepared airstrips.

In 2023, Tecnam introduced the option to equip the P2012 Traveller with Continental GTSIO-520-S engines, offering comparable power output to the Lycoming alternative but with different performance characteristics .

=== Market ===
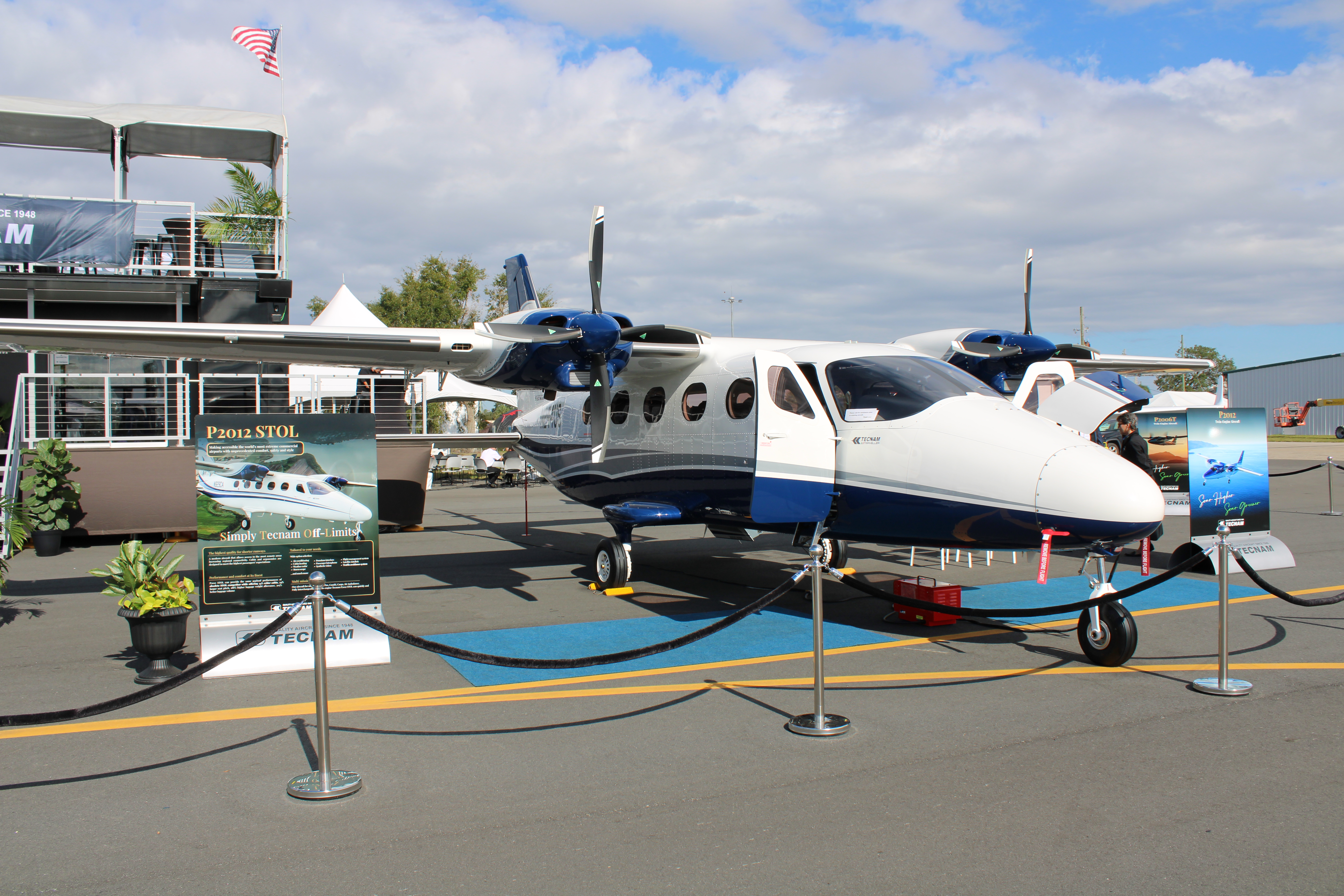
P2012 at NBAA 2022

At the April 2011 unveiling, Tecnam planned VIP, cargo, parachuting and medevac variants after the commuter airliner introduction in 2015. In November 2015, Cape Air signed a letter of intent to order 100 aircraft while three prototypes were being built at Tecnam's plant in Capua, Italy. Tecnam aimed for 25 to 35 deliveries in 2019 and more in following years. Six new customers from Argentina, the South Pacific region and Russia had placed orders at the April 2017 AERO Friedrichshafen. Tecnam extended its Capua factory for a P2012 production area, capable of producing up to 40 aircraft per year. The delivery schedule for the first 20 aircraft to Cape Air was firmed on 21 September 2017: these first deliveries are due in January 2019 after EASA and FAA certification.

Tecnam took a €100,000 ($118,200) deposit to secure 2019 delivery positions, with 20 aircraft per year planned for delivery between 2019 and 2023. A second factory could be established to further expand production. Service entry during early 2019 planned for 20 deliveries, including eight to Cape Air, two for Seychelles-based Zil Air from July, and the others for charter and utility operators. Cape Air intended to allocate its first eight aircraft to serve New England from its Hyannis, Massachusetts, headquarters: Cape Cod, Nantucket, Martha’s Vineyard, Vermont and Maine, as a FAR part 135 operator while training first officers. By October 2018, Tecnam had secured 125 orders and options for the €2.35 million ($2.7 million) Traveller, forecasting a demand for 11,500 commuter aircraft over the following ten years. Tecnam planned to build 15 aircraft during 2019; increasing to 25 in 2020 and to 35 during 2021. Cape Air had taken delivery of 20 aircraft by March 2021 and had a firm order for delivery of 10 more. The airline also has options for 92 more aircraft over the next 10 years.

The first P2012 Sentinel SMP was delivered to APEX Flight Academy in Taiwan in late 2021, with sensor installation planned locally. The variant was officially unveiled to the public at the Farnborough International Airshow in July 2022, where Tecnam introduced the P2012 Sentinel SMP as a dedicated platform for surveillance, maritime patrol, and mapping missions.

Kenai Aviation, based in Alaska, added its first P2012 in 2022 and a third aircraft in April 2024. The operator cited the P2012’s reliability, short-field performance, and low operating cost as ideal for challenging Alaskan routes, having flown nearly 30,000 passengers and 29,000 lb of cargo within two years.

Pacific Air Charters in Hawaii began operating the P2012 in 2023 and participated in relief efforts following the Maui wildfires, highlighting the aircraft's utility in medevac and emergency logistics roles. A third aircraft was under assembly by late 2023, with 24 additional aircraft on option. Southern Airways Express also began integrating the P2012 into its US commuter network by 2023.

In May 2023, Flyvbird, a German-Norwegian on-demand airline, ordered an unspecified number of P2012 Travellers and P2012 STOLs for use in dynamic short-haul operations. A joint announcement from Tecnam and Flyvbird stated, "in lieu of a traditional hub-and-spoke network, the scheduling platform uses a proprietary algorithm to optimize the daily flight schedule based on paid bookings and operational constraints. Flyvbird will provide customers a guaranteed fixed travel timeframe to their destination at the point of booking, and exact itinerary details prior to departure." A delivery schedule was not announced.

St. Barth Executive, based in the French Caribbean, became the launch customer and first operator to introduce the P2012 STOL into revenue service. The first passenger flight was conducted on 1 August 2024, connecting Pointe-à-Pitre (Guadeloupe) and Saint-Barthélemy, a route previously accessible only by sea. Operated under the Air Inter Iles brand, the service began with three daily flights, rising to six in high season. The STOL variant is particularly suited to the challenging conditions of Saint-Barthélemy’s short runway (646 meters) and steep approach. St. Barth Executive planned to operate three P2012 STOL aircraft to serve regional island routes and improve inter-island connectivity in the French Caribbean.

In April 2025, FLN Frisia Luftverkehr, also known as Inselflieger, received its first P2012 STOL aircraft to enhance connectivity between Germany’s mainland and the East Frisian Islands. The aircraft's short takeoff and landing capabilities make it ideal for operations on the region's short runways.

To meet the growing demand for the STOL and special-mission variants, Tecnam announced in 2024 a 50% increase in production capacity, with up to 30 aircraft annually produced between its Capua and Naples sites.

== Design ==
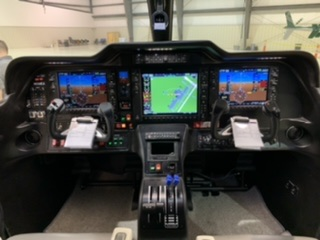
The Flight Deck of the Tecnam P2012 Traveller

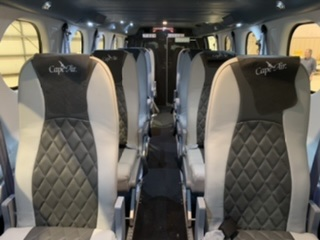
The Cabin of Cape Air's Tecnam P2012 Traveller

The Traveller is a twin piston-engined aircraft, powered by a pair of Lycoming TEO540C1As, each producing 375 hp (280 kW), which give the type a maximum permissible speed (VNE) of 226 kn (419 km/h). In June 2023 the option of fitting twin 375 hp (280 kW) Continental GTSIO-520-S engines was added by Tecnam with a maximum permissible speed (VNE) of 228 kn (422 km/h). While the Lycoming engines use full authority digital engine control (FADEC) and a four-blade propeller, the Continental variant offers a more traditional throttle-propeller-mixture setup with three-blade propellers. The design complies with FAR Part 23 and EASA CS-23 regulations.

Performance characteristics vary by configuration. The P2012 Traveller equipped with Continental engines offers a maximum range of up to 1,350 nautical miles (2,500 km) and a maximum endurance of 13 hours, while the Lycoming-powered version reaches up to 1,000 nautical miles (1,852 km) and 10 hours of endurance. The STOL variant, designed for operations on short and unprepared runways, has a maximum range of 1,100 nautical miles (2,037 km) and an endurance of up to 12 hours. The STOL variant is capable of taking off in 315 meters (1,033 ft) and landing in 225 meters (738 ft) at maximum landing weight.

The P2012 aims to replace the Cessna 402, to compete with aircraft like the Britten-Norman BN-2 Islander and modern single-engine models like the Quest Kodiak and could complement the larger DHC-6 Twin Otter. Cape Air required single-pilot operations, a modern cockpit, an unpressurised cabin and a metal airframe. The shoulder wing enhances visibility during landing, the fixed landing gear is suitable for rough landing strips. The removable panels for underfloor access simplify maintenance and operations.

The P2012 can be quickly reconfigured for various missions including air ambulance (single or dual stretcher), cargo transport (up to 3.1 m³), combi (passenger and freight), skydive operations, and special missions (Sentinel SMP variant). Optional features include operator consoles, EO/IR sensor bays, and extended endurance kits.

The cabin accommodates up to nine passengers in a standard commuter configuration, with individual seats arranged in a single-aisle layout. Each seat is positioned next to a rectangular window and is equipped with personal reading lights and dual USB charging ports. Overhead air vents provide adjustable ventilation. Cabin options include dual-zone air conditioning and heating. The interior features a flat floor, a constant cross-section, and a dedicated boarding door with integrated steps. Although designed for single-pilot operations, the aircraft can also be flown with two crew members during initial operator transition or for training. The cockpit layout follows a clean-sheet design, offering direct access to flight systems and avionics.

The P2012 is equipped with the Garmin G1000 NXi integrated flight deck, featuring two primary flight displays and a multifunction display as standard. The system includes synthetic vision, terrain and traffic awareness, weather radar (GWX 75), and a three-axis GFC-700 autopilot with yaw damper. Standard avionics also include ADS-B IN/OUT, engine monitoring, and flight data recording. Optional systems include an automatic direction finder, satellite tracking and communications (Iridium), and mission consoles for surveillance variants. The cockpit layout adheres to Tecnam’s “SPACE” (Single Pilot Advanced Cockpit Environment) philosophy, designed to maximize situational awareness and minimize workload in single-pilot operations.

The primary flight controls are conventional for a low workload. Seats can be removed for freight or stretchers. Loading is eased by the large rear-facing door. Additional storage compartments are in the nose and fuselage rear side. The fuselage is mostly made in light aluminium alloy, including its formed frames, beams, stringers and skin, which are bolted and rivetted together. The aircraft's cantilever wing is also mostly made of light alloys. Beams, main spar caps, wing and tail surface attachments, are formed from billets. The main landing gear is a pair of two fixed legs with oleo struts attached to the fuselage via a cantilever beam faired by streamlined pods. The steerable nose gear with a single shock-absorbing leg is attached to the forward bulkhead of the fuselage.

The wing has two spars with sheet metal ribs and a fibre-reinforced plastic (GFRP) leading edge. It has a semi-tapered planform featuring a NACA five digit airfoil selected for low drag and a high maximum lift coefficient. The wing box fuel tanks between the two spars have a capacity of 800 litres (212 US gallons). Low stall speeds for steep approaches and short landings are enabled by wide slotted flaps, electrically actuated and made of an aluminium alloy. All control surfaces have wide trim tabs, while the rudder has a yaw damper integrated with the automatic flight control system.

An optional ferry tank system can be installed to increase total fuel capacity, extending the endurance up to 13 hours depending on load and configuration.

== Variants ==
P2012 Traveller
Standard passenger and utility version. It can be configured for commuter, air taxi, cargo, medevac, and skydive operations. It is available with either Lycoming TEO-540-C1A engines with FADEC and four-blade propellers, or Continental GTSIO-520-S engines with a traditional control setup and three-blade propellers.
P2012 SMP
Special Mission Platform variant designed for roles such as surveillance, aerial mapping, maritime patrol, and environmental monitoring. It includes provisions for sensor bays, operator consoles, and extended endurance configurations.
P2012 STOL
STOL variant equipped with 375 hp (280 kW) Continental GTSIO-520-S engines and extended wingspan. It is certified for operations on unprepared and short runways, with take-off and landing distances of 315 m and 225 m respectively.
P-Volt
Proposed electric-powered passenger derivative of P2012, later cancelled. Proposal was for an aircraft equipped with a 1,100 kg (2,400 lb) battery pack and two 320 kW (430 hp) motors, giving a range of 85 nmi (157 km); 98 mi), with a 180 kn (330 km/h) top speed and a 4,086 kg (9,008 lb) ramp weight.

== Specifications ==
Data from Tecnam

General characteristics

- Crew: 1 or 2
- Capacity: 9 passenger seats / 1,414 kg (3,117 lb) useful load including fuel
- Length: 11.8 m (38 ft 9 in)
- Wingspan: 14 m (45 ft 11 in) ; 16.6 m (54 ft) on STOL variant
- Height: 4.4 m (14 ft 5 in)
- Wing area: 25.4 m^{2} (273 sq ft)
- Aspect ratio: 7.7
- Empty weight: 2,386 kg (5,260 lb) ; 2,416 kg (5,326 lb) on STOL variant
- Max takeoff weight: 3,680 kg (8,113 lb)
- Fuel capacity: 880 L (230 US gal) usable fuel
- Powerplant: 2 × Lycoming TEO-540C1A 6-cylinder air-cooled horizontally-opposed turbocharged piston engines, 280 kW (375 hp) each
- Powerplant: 2 × Continental GTSIO-520-S 6-cylinder horizontally-opposed turbocharged, geared piston engines, 280 kW (375 hp) each
- Propellers: 3 or 4-bladed MT-Propeller, 1.95 m (6 ft 5 in) diameter constant-speed fully-feathering propeller

Performance

- Maximum speed: 359 km/h (223 mph, 194 kn) at 10,000 ft (3,000 m)
- Cruise speed: 319 km/h (198 mph, 172 kn) at 75% power at 10,000 ft (3,000 m)
- Stall speed: 120 km/h (75 mph, 65 kn) full flaps; 122 km/h (76 mph; 66 kn) full flaps on STOL variant
- Never exceed speed: 419 km/h (260 mph, 226 kn)
- Range: 2,500 km (1,600 mi, 1,300 nmi)
- Service ceiling: 5,900 m (19,500 ft) restricted to four passengers over 4,000 m (13,000 ft)
- Rate of climb: 5.8 m/s (1,140 ft/min) ; 6.53 m/s (1,285 ft/min) on STOL variant
- Wing loading: 145 kg/m^{2} (30 lb/sq ft)
- Power/mass: 6.6 kg/kW (10.8 lb/hp)
- Takeoff run: 564 m (1,850 ft); 445 m (1,460 ft) on STOL variant
- Takeoff distance: 791 m (2,595 ft); 682 m (2,238 ft) on STOL variant
- Landing run: 365 m (1,198 ft); 290 m (950 ft) on STOL variant
- Landing distance: 743 m (2,438 ft); 590 m (1,940 ft) on STOL variant
- Fuel Consumption: 117 L/h (31 US gal/h)

== See also ==
Related development

- Tecnam P2006T

Aircraft of comparable role, configuration, and era

- Britten-Norman Islander
- Piper PA-31 Navajo
- Cessna 402
