= Private aviation =

Civil aviation that does not include flying for hire

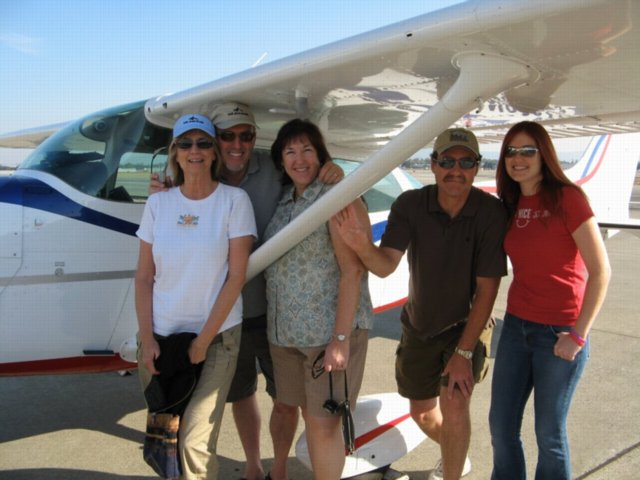
Pilot and family, with their Cessna 172

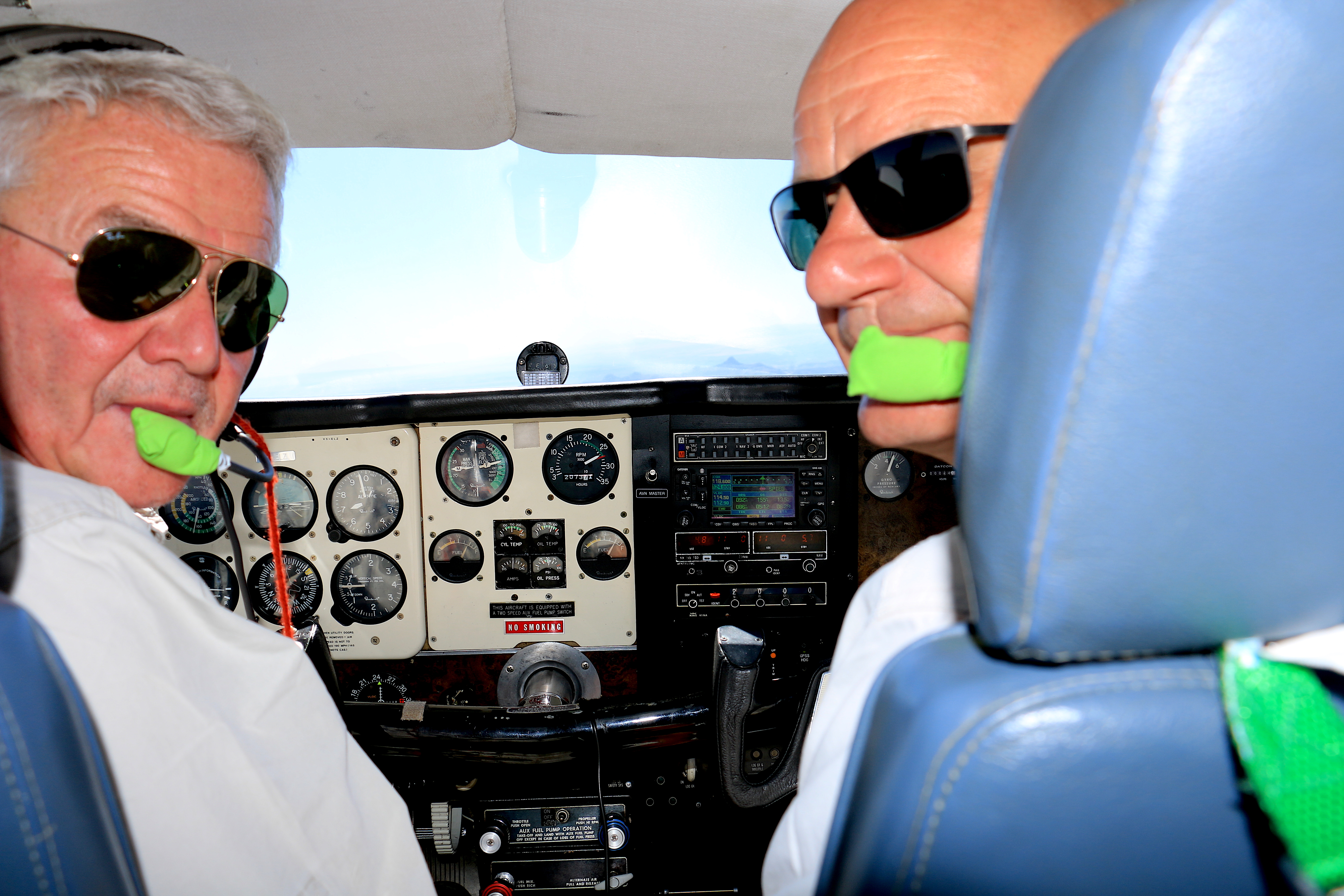
Private pilot (left) and passenger (right) in a Beechcraft A36 near Spiegelberg, Namibia (2016)

Private aviation is the part of civil aviation that does not include flying for hire, which is termed commercial aviation. In 2022, private air travel was noted as increasing.

== Definition ==
Private aviation and commercial aviation are not rigorously defined. In general, private aviation is regarded as flights that do not require a commercial pilot licence (CPL) or higher. Some commercial activities do not require a CPL, for example in Europe a flight instructor may have a private pilot licence (PPL). Nonetheless, in the United Kingdom flight instruction is considered a commercial operation.

In most countries, private flights are always general aviation flights, but the opposite is not true: many general aviation flights (such as corporate and business aviation) are commercial in that the pilot is hired and paid.

In private flight the pilot is not paid, and all aircraft operating expenses are generally paid by the pilot. In some countries such as the United States, aircraft operating expenses for a flight may optionally be divided with any passengers up to a pro rata amount. For example, if aircraft operating expenses total $120 for a flight with pilot and three passengers, each of the three passengers could not pay more than $30 (one fourth) of the expenses with the remainder paid by the pilot.

It is the purpose of the flight, not the aircraft or pilot, that determines whether the flight is private. For example, if a commercially licensed pilot flies a plane to visit a friend or attend a business meeting, this would be a private flight. Conversely, a private pilot could legally fly a multi-engine complex aircraft carrying passengers for non-commercial purposes (no compensation paid to the pilot, and a pro rata or larger portion of the aircraft operating expenses paid by the pilot).

== General aspects ==
Many private pilots fly for their own enjoyment, or to share the joys and convenience of general aviation with friends and family.

In many countries, private aviation operates to less strict standards than commercial aviation. For example, in Canada and the United States, aircraft owners are allowed to perform basic maintenance tasks (such as oil or tire changes) on their own aircraft, but only licensed mechanics may perform those tasks on aircraft used for commercial operations. Private pilots normally are not required to demonstrate the same level of proficiency on their flight tests that is required for commercial pilots, and they take fewer and less rigorous medical examinations. The majority of active pilots hold a Private Pilot license.

== See also ==
- Pilot certification in the United States
- Private pilot licence
- List of current production certified light aircraft
