= EASA CS-23 =

EU certification procedure for light aircraft

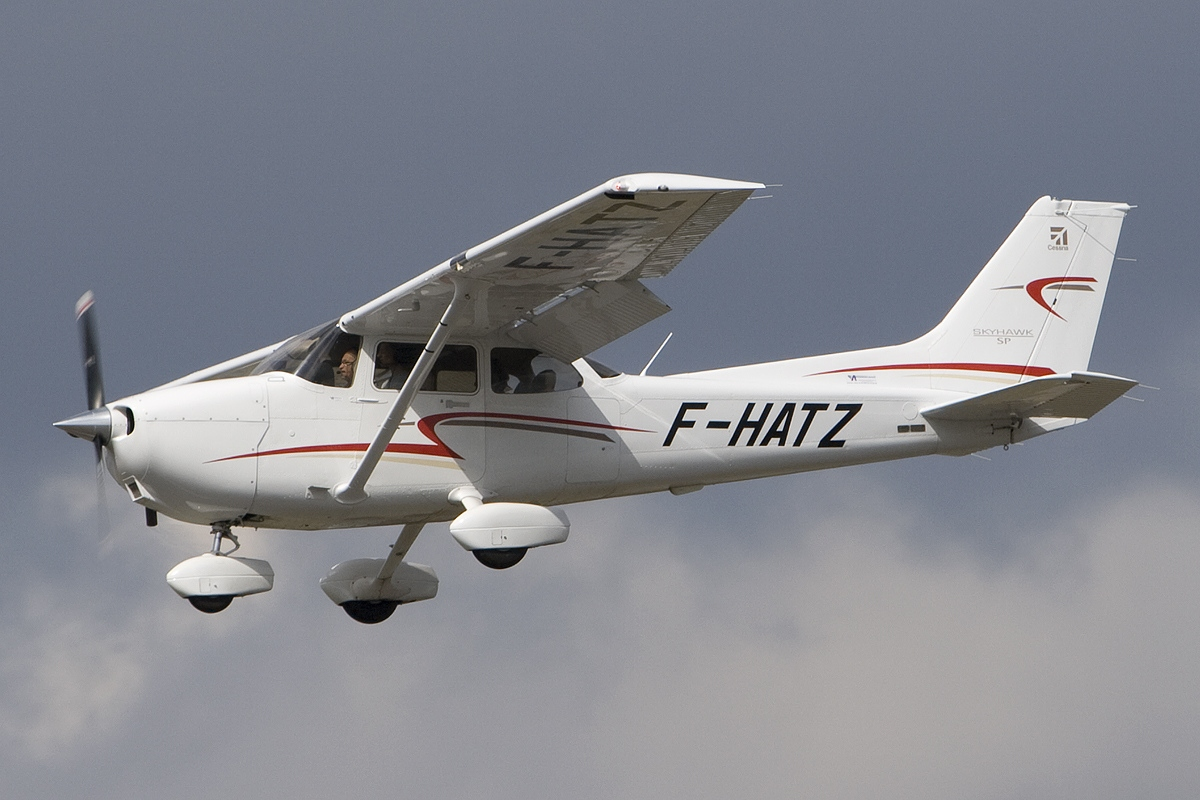
A Cessna 172

EASA CS-23 is the European Union Aviation Safety Agency Certification Specification for Normal, Utility, Aerobatic and Commuter Aeroplanes.

== Description ==
This certification procedure applies to light aircraft:

- Aeroplanes in the normal, utility, or aerobatic categories with a maximum of 9 seats (excluding pilot(s)) and a maximum take-off mass of 5,670 kg (12,500 lbs);
- Aeroplanes in the commuter category with a maximum of 19 seats (excluding pilot(s)) and a maximum take-off mass of 8,618 kg (19,000 lbs).

Depending on the chosen category, CS-23 prescribes several maneuvers (CS 23.3):

- Normal Category: Normal flight, no aerobatics; stalls as well as chandelles, lazy eights, and steep turns with a maximum bank angle of 60°;
- Utility Category: As Normal Category, but with bank angles up to 90°; additionally spins, if approved by the manufacturer;
- Aerobatic Category: No limitations imposed by the certification regulation;
- Commuter Category: Normal flight, stalls, and steep turns with bank angles up to 60°.

Aircraft not certified in the commuter category can be certified for multiple categories.

It describes the minimum requirements that must be met for the certification of an aircraft in this class. If the manufacturer of the aircraft has sufficiently demonstrated all points, the certification authority issues a type certificate.

Certification Specifications are "soft law", which is not legally binding. Manufacturers may apply for exemptions from CS-23 where necessary.

== See also ==
- List of large aircraft
- List of current production certified light aircraft
- EASA CS-LSA, the European certification for Light Sport Aeroplanes (maximum 600 for land / 650 kg for seaplanes)
- EASA CS-VLA, the European certification for Very Light Aircraft (maximum 750 kg)
- EASA CS-25, Large Aeroplanes
- EASA CS-27, Small Rotorcraft
- EASA CS-29, Large Rotorcraft
- Federal Aviation Regulations § Part 23
- Transport category
