= List of current production certified light aircraft =

This list of light aircraft certified for general aviation that is currently in production (as of 2026) does not include single pilot very light twin turbojet airplanes (VLJ) or helicopters.

Single engine piston taildragger aircraft
Model	Engine	Power hp	Seats	Wing Sq. Ft.	MTOW lb	Empty lb	Cruise knots	Range nmi
American Champion Citabria	L. O-235/320/360	118-180	2	165-172	1,750-1,950	1,120-1,300	100-115	466-595
American Champion Scout	L. O-360/390	180-210	2	180	2,150	1,320-1,340	113-128	938
American Champion Decathlon	L. AEIO-360/390	180-210	2	164-169	1,950	1,305-1,330	123-129	336-417
Aviat Husky	L. O-360	180-200	2	183	2,250	1,275	122	695-720
CubCrafters Top Cub	L. O-360	180	2	178	2,300	1,200	97	495
CubCrafters XCub	L. O-360	180	2	174.8	2,300	1,212	126	695
Maule M-4	L. O-360	180	2/4	162.7	2,500	1,375	116	810
Maule M-7/M-9	L. O-360/540	180-260	4/5	173.7	2,500-2,800	1,470-1,700	120-141	695-1072
Seabird Seeker	L. IO-390	210	2	140.5	2,147	1,342	114	540

Single engine piston aircraft with tricycle landing gear
Model	Engine	Power hp	Seats	Wing Sq. Ft.	MTOW lb	Empty lb	Cruise knots	Range nmi
AS 202 Bravo NG	L. AEIO-360	180	3	149	2,202	1,389	115	480
Cessna 172 Skyhawk	L. IO-360/CD-155	155-180	4	174	2,550	1,670-1,780	110-125	640-885
Cessna 182 Skylane	L. IO/TIO-540	230	4	174	3,100	1,965	135	915
Cessna 206 Stationair	L. TIO-540	310	6	174	3,789	2,336	155	703
Cirrus SR20	L. IO-390	215	5	145	3,150	2,126	145	709
Cirrus SR22	C. IO/TSIO-550	310-315	5	145	3,600	2,276-2,358	171-201	1021-1169
Diamond DA20	C. IO-240	125	2	125	1,764	1,180	130	544
Diamond DA40	L. IO-360/AE300	170-180	4	145	2,646-2,888	1,746-1,984	131-137	830-984
GA8 Airvan	L. IO/TIO-540	300-320	8	208	4,000-4200	2,275-2,374	130-135	880
Piper PA-28	L. O-320/360/CD-155	160-170	4	170	2,440-2,750	1,530-1,798	112-137	513-880
Piper M350	L. TIO-540	350	6	175	4,340	3,003-3,050	213	1343
Tecnam P2010	L. IO-360/390	180-215	4	149,6	2,557	1,631	128-139	597-600
Zlin 242L	AEIO-360-A1B6	210	2	141,5	2,400	1,642	116	431
Guanyi Aviation GA20	L. IO-320	160	4	150	2,447	1521	130	648

Piston engine twin
Model	Engine	Unit hp	Seats	Wing Sq. Ft.	MTOW lb	Empty lb	Cruise knots	Range nmi
Britten-Norman Islander	L. IO-540	300	9	325	6,600	4,114	143	939
Diamond DA42	AE300	170	4	175.3	4,407	3,109	197	1225
Diamond DA62	AE330	180	7	184	5,071	3,461	192	1288
Piper Seminole	L. 0-360-A1H6	180	4	184	3,800	2,625	162	700
Tecnam P2006T	R. 912	100	4	159	2,712	1,806	135	669
Tecnam P2012	L. TEO-540/ C. GTSIO-520-S	375	11	273-?	8,113	5,260-5,326	170-185	905-950
Vulcanair P-68C	L. IO/TIO-360	200-210	6	200	4,548-4,630	3,130-3,198	160-168	890-1103

Single turboprop
Model	Engine	Power hp	Seats	Wing Sq. Ft.	MTOW lb	Empty lb	Cruise knots	Range nmi
Cessna 208 (Grand) Caravan	P&WC PT6A	675-867	10-14	279	8,000-8,807	4,730-5,310	185-186	964-1,070
Daher TBM 910/930	P&WC PT6A	1,200	6	193.75	7,394	4,629	326	1,730
Epic E1000	P&WC PT6A	1,200	6	203	8,000	4,600	305	1,650
GippsAero GA10 Airvan	R-R 250	450	10	208	4,750	2,475	150	850
Pilatus PC-12	P&WC PT6A	1,200	11	277.8	10,450	6,782	269	1,845
Piper M500, M600 and M700	P&WC PT6A	500-600	6	183-209	5,092-6,000	3,436-3,650	247-257	1000-1,484
Quest Kodiak	P&WC PT6A	700	10	240	7,255	3,770	178	1,132

Twin turboprop
Model	Engine	Unit hp	Seats	Wing Sq. Ft.	MTOW lb	Empty lb	Cruise knots	Range nmi
Britten-Norman Islander	R-R 250	325	9	325	7,000	4,040	170	728
Beech Super King Air	P&WC PT6A-52	850-1,050	10-11	310	12,500-16,500	8,830-9,995	303-310	1,720-2,692
Piaggio P.180 Avanti	P&WC PT6A-66B	850	10	172	12,100	7,850	356	1,470
Viking DHC-6 Twin Otter	P&WC PT6A-34	620	21	420	12,500	5,851	170	775
Vulcanair A-Viator	R-R 250	328	10	200	6,613	3,858	178	1,050

Single turbojet
Model	Engine	Thrust lbf	Seats	Wing Sq. Ft.	MTOW lb	Empty lb	Cruise knots	Range nmi
Cirrus Vision SF50	Williams FJ33-5A turbofan	1,846	7	195.7	6,000	3,550	305	600-690

== See also ==
- List of very light jets
