= Plastic limit theorems =

Plastic limit theorems in continuum mechanics provide two bounds that can be used to determine whether material failure is possible by means of plastic deformation for a given external loading scenario. According to the theorems, to find the range within which the true solution must lie, it is necessary to find both a stress field that balances the external forces and a velocity field or flow pattern that corresponds to those stresses. If the upper and lower bounds provided by the velocity field and stress field coincide, the exact value of the collapse load is determined.

== Limit theorems ==
The two plastic limit theorems apply to any elastic-perfectly plastic body or assemblage of bodies.

Lower limit theorem:

If an equilibrium distribution of stress can be found which balances the applied load and nowhere violates the yield criterion, the body (or bodies) will not fail, or will be just at the point of failure.

Upper limit theorem:

The body (or bodies) will collapse if there is any compatible pattern of plastic deformation for which the rate of work done by the external loads exceeds the internal plastic dissipation.
