= APEX Flight Academy =

Coordinates: 22°45′17″N 121°06′06″E

APEX flight academy
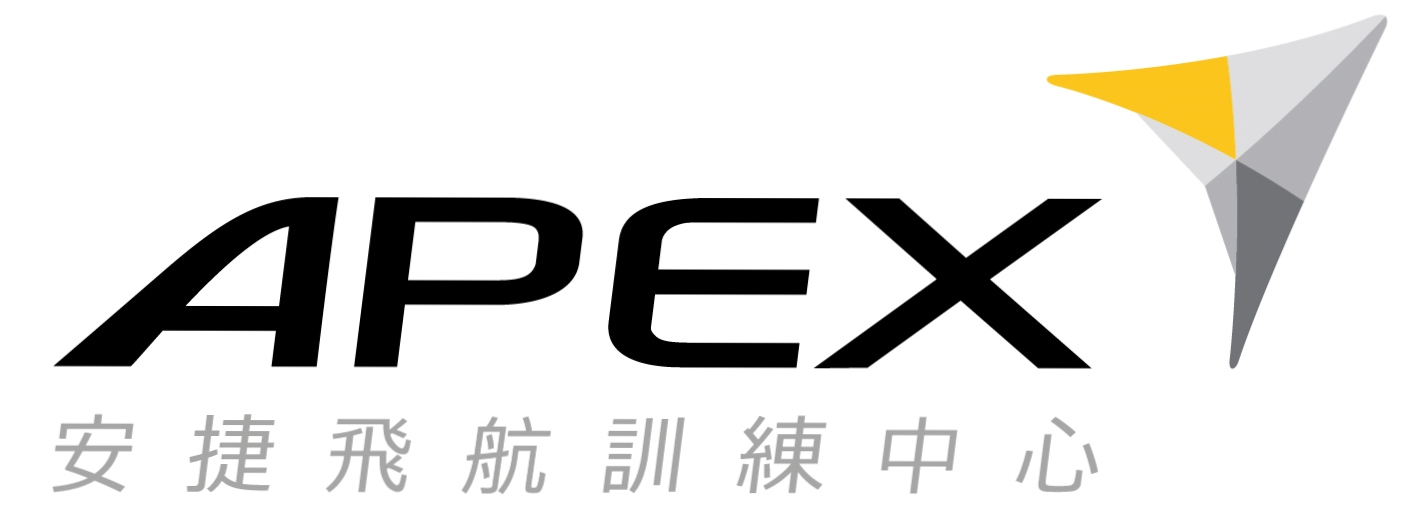
- Type: flight school
- Industry: Flying training
- Founded: 2014
- Headquarters: Taitung Airport, Taiwan
- Services: Airline Transport Pilot Licence training.
- Website: apexflightacademy.com

The APEX flight academy based in Taitung Airport, Taiwan, is a flight training organization created in 2014.

Its particularity is that it is the first and only Taiwan CAA 141 (Civil Aviation Authority) certified flight training organisation in Taiwan. Its curriculum offers real flights and simulator based programs that enable students to be trained.

In 2018, the school signed an agreement with the French Civil Aviation University to conduct EASA certified trainings for airlines and manufacturers.

Apex had a dramatic training accident where an instructor and 2 students were forced to ditch in the ocean on an instrument training flight.
