= Ultimate load =

In engineering, the ultimate load is a statistical figure used in calculations, and should (hopefully) never actually occur. It is used for instance in aerospace engineering, bridge and tunnel construction. This is also commonly used in knowing the properties of metal beams. For example, it is used in experiments such as tensile testing machine (TTM) and universal testing machine (UTM).

== Relation to safety factor and limit load ==
Strength requirements are specified in terms of limit loads (the maximum loads to be expected in service) and ultimate loads (limit loads multiplied by prescribed factors of safety).

Mathematically, their relation can be expressed as: $B_u \ge B_l \times j$, where:

- B_{u} is the ultimate load
- B_{l} is the limit load
- j is the factor of safety

== Aircraft design ==
With respect to aircraft structure and design, ultimate load is the amount of load applied to a component beyond which the component will fail. The chance that it will occur is, however, not zero, and, if it were to occur, then the relevant structure in the aircraft would stand a large chance of fracture.

During the testing for determination of the loads, no fracture must occur at the ultimate load for a period of 3 seconds.

== See also ==
- Cantilever, construction that extends horizontally and is unsupported at one end, by applying shear stress and bending moment at its support base
- List of engineering topics
- Occupational Safety and Health Administration (OSHA), a United States regulatory agency that inspects and examines workplaces
- Stress test, deliberate testing beyond normal operational capacity, often to a breaking point
- Ultimate tensile strength, the maximum stress a material can withstand while being stretched or pulled before breaking
