= OpenAirplane =

American aircraft rental company

- Available in: English
- Headquarters: Chicago, Illinois, {{{location_country}}}
- Website: www.openairplane.com
- Commercial: Yes
- Launched: 2013-06-17
- Current status: Out of business (23 December 2019)

OpenAirplane was a general aviation service that aimed to simplify the aircraft rental process for pilots and aircraft owners. Founded in 2013 by Rod Rakic and Adam Fast, the company operated as an online platform connecting pilots with local flight schools, flying clubs, and aircraft owners, allowing them to rent aircraft more easily.

The company ceased operations on 23 December 2019.

== History ==
OpenAirplane was founded in 2012 as a web-based service to make access to rental aircraft easier. Pilots in the United States usually need a flight review (also called a "checkout") with a certified flight instructor at each aircraft rental company or fixed-base operator (FBO) that they wish to rent from, regardless of recent flight experience. This checkout can take several hours and the pilot must pay for both the rental of the airplane as well as the wage of the flight instructor.

OpenAirplane requires member pilots to complete a standardized checkout procedure called a "Universal Pilot Checkout (UPC)" in a particular make and model of aircraft at an OpenAirplane member FBO. Once successfully completed, the UPC allows a pilot to fly the same make/model aircraft at any other member FBO without additional checkrides or experience reviews. The checkout procedure is based on the Civil Air Patrol (CAP) procedure and pilots holding the relevant CAP approval do not need to carry out a further checkout.

The company was endorsed by Starr Aviation, a member of Starr International Company (insurance), and the Cessna Aircraft Company.

OpenAirplane launched on June 17, 2013 with operators in six US locations: Chicago, Long Island, Kissimmee, Troy, Long Beach, and San Jose. As of Sep 2014, OpenAirplane had grown to over 71 locations.

At Sun 'n Fun 2014, OpenAirplane announced the expansion of their program to allow privately owned aircraft to be rented through OpenAirplane. Insurance carrier Starr Aviation created a new kind of insurance policy that offered coverage for aircraft owners who wanted to make their aircraft available to pilots using OpenAirplane. The new policy is claimed to only be a modest increase in cost compared to group rental coverage that typically costs four- or eight-times as much as a personal aircraft policy.

In Oct 2014, OpenAirplane and Cirrus Aircraft Corporation announced a collaboration where pilots who complete Cirrus factory training are able to rent the same model Cirrus aircraft in the OpenAirplane network without needing an OpenAirplane checkout. The privilege is valid for six months, after which the pilot will need to complete a normal OpenAirplane UPC.

The company shutdown on 23 December 2019. Founder Rod Rakic blamed the company's failure on lack of market interest. He stated "while the idea of OpenAirplane won us praise, fans, and even super fans, the reality is that too few pilots took to the skies to make the operation sustainable. If there’s one thing that we learned the hard way, it is that it’s tough to get pilots off the couch and into the cockpit."
