= General aviation =

Civil use of aircraft excluding commercial transportation

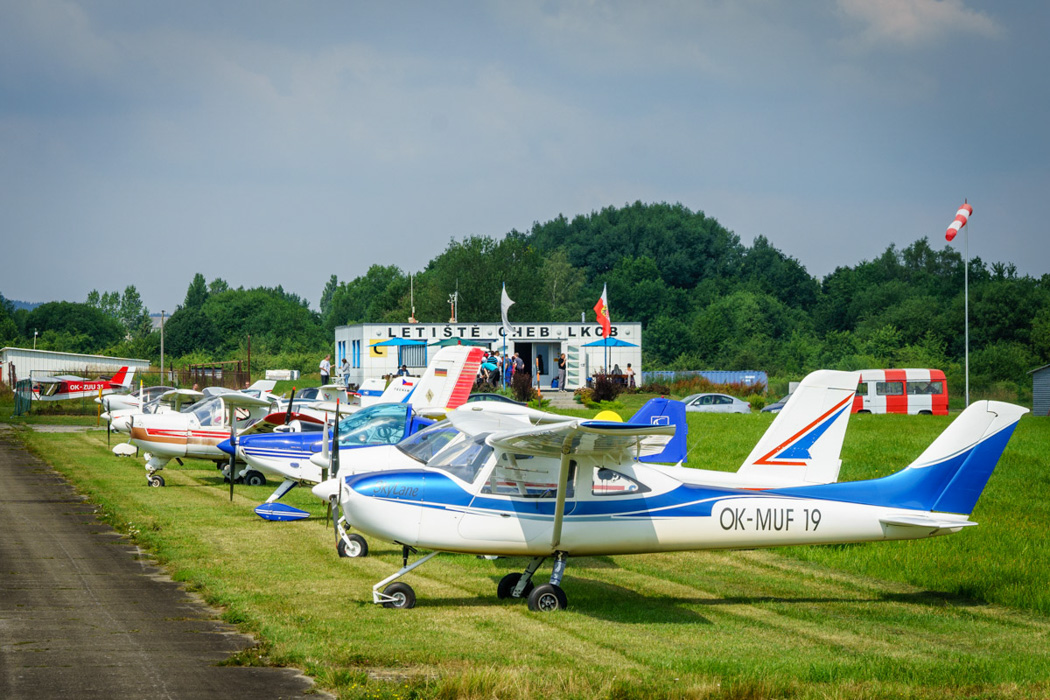
General aviation aircraft at Cheb Airfield in Czech Republic

General aviation (GA) is defined by the International Civil Aviation Organization (ICAO) as all civil aviation aircraft operations except for commercial air transport or aerial work, which is defined as specialized aviation services for other purposes. However, for statistical purposes, ICAO uses a definition of general aviation which includes aerial work.

General aviation includes "private transport" and recreational components of aviation, most of which is accomplished with light aircraft.

== Definition ==
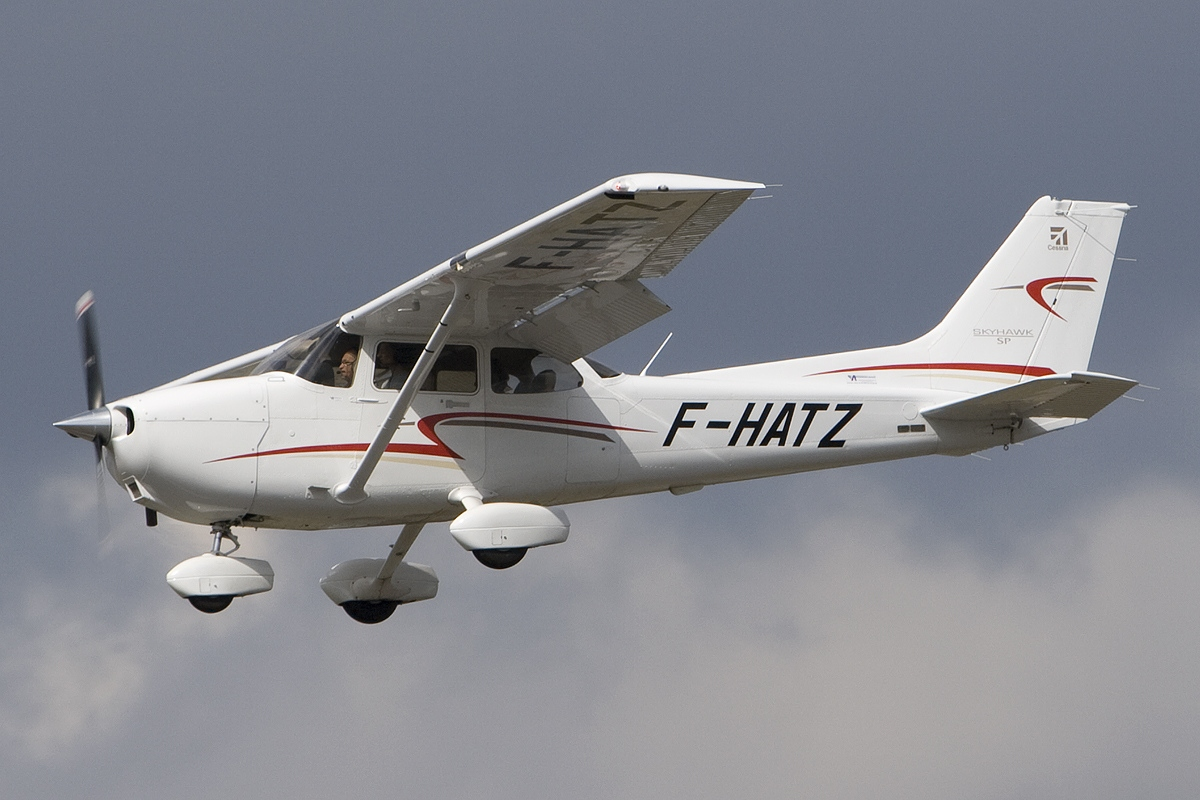
Cessna 172, the most-produced aircraft in history

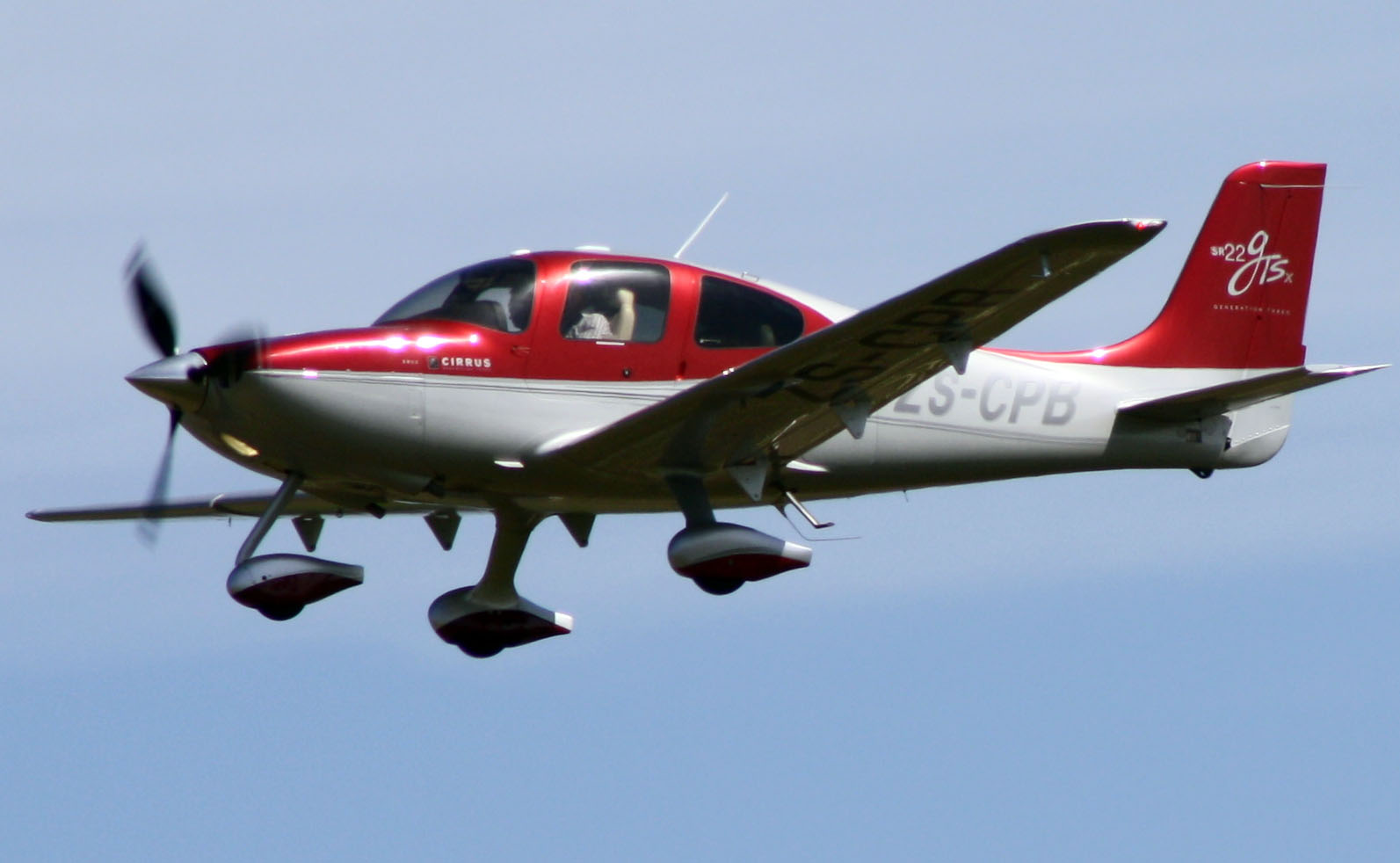
Cirrus SR22, the most-produced GA aircraft of the 21st century

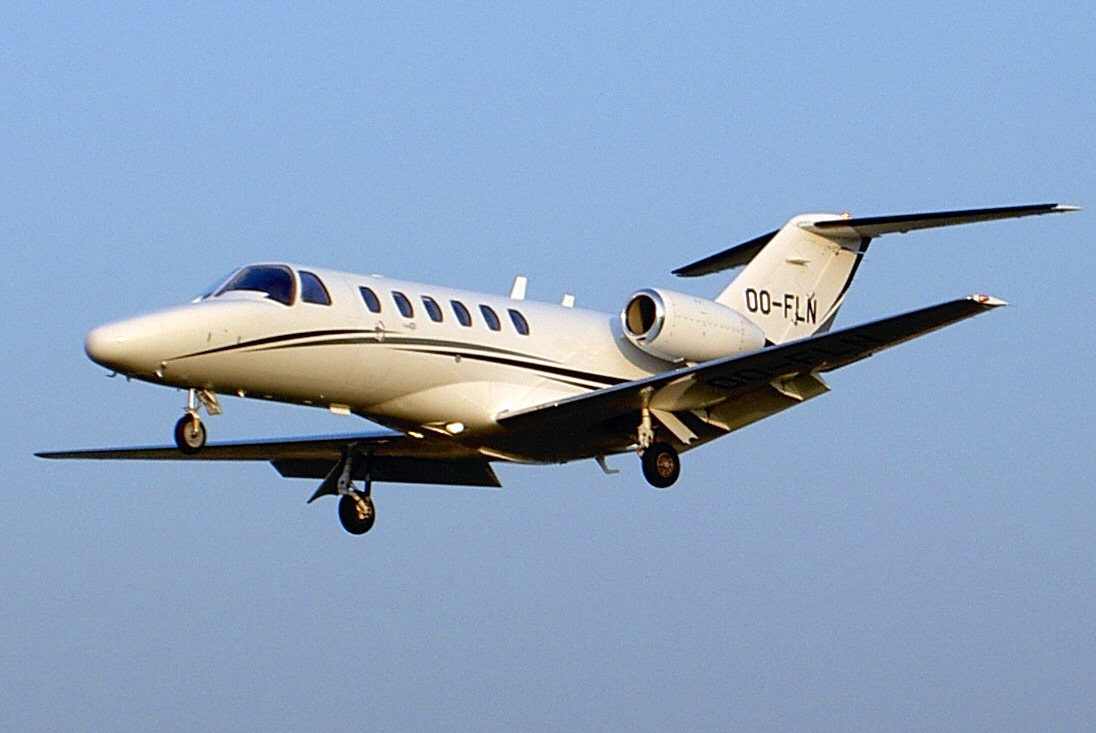
Cessna CitationJet/M2, part of the Citation family of business jets

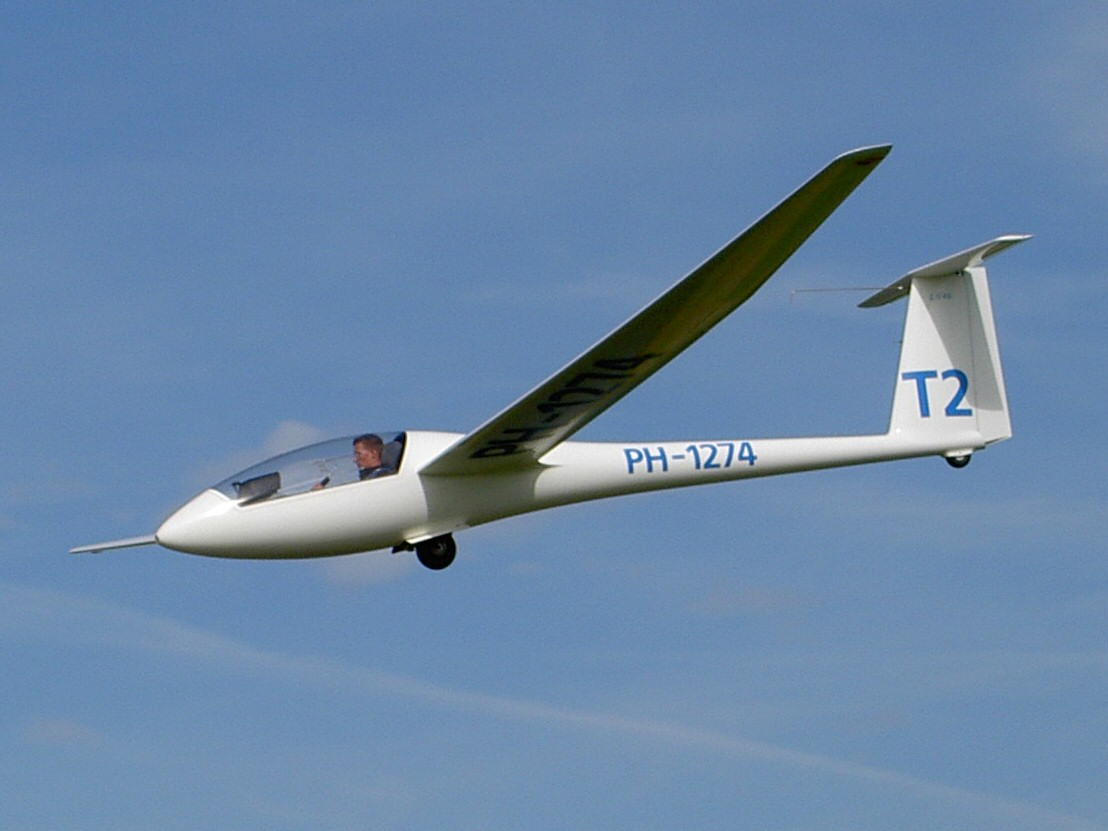
Sailplane, a Rolladen-Schneider LS4

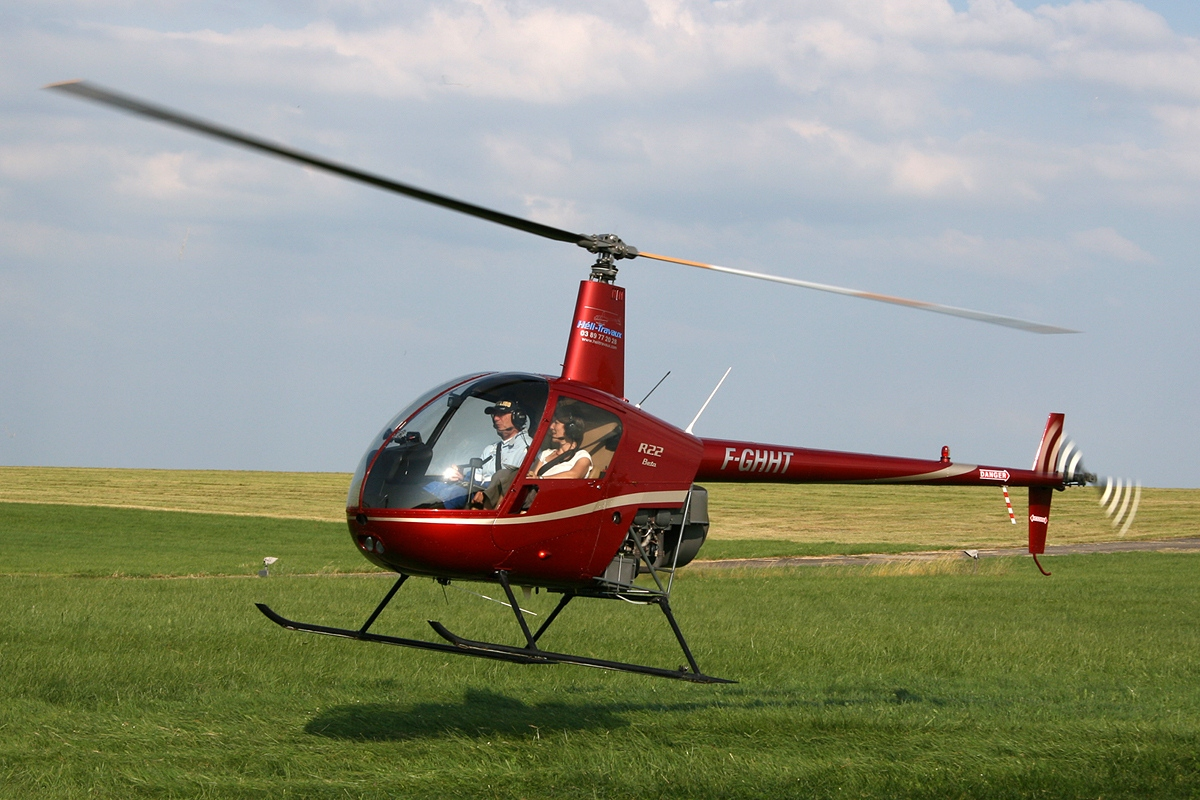
Robinson R22, a light piston-engine helicopter

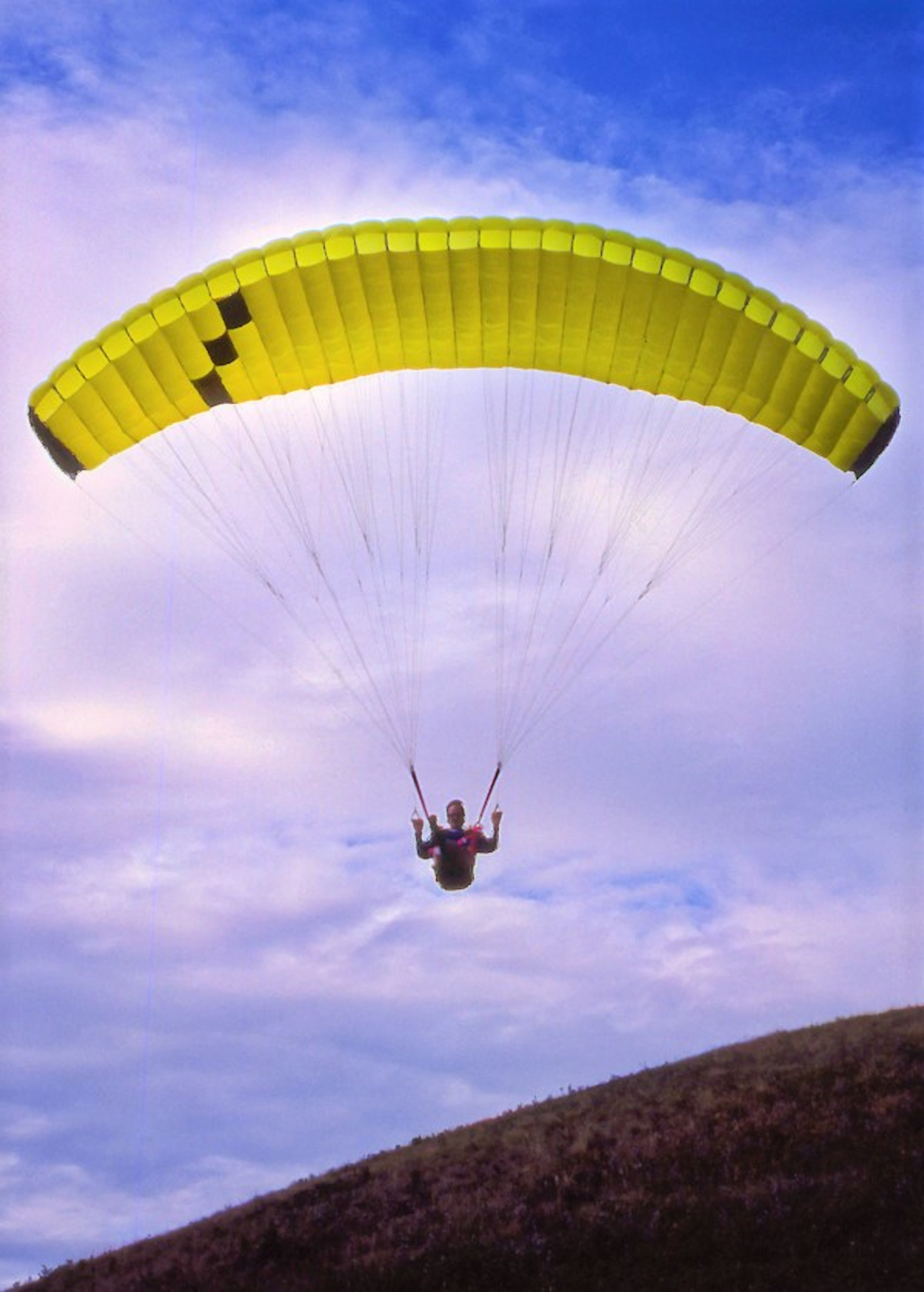
Paraglider in flight

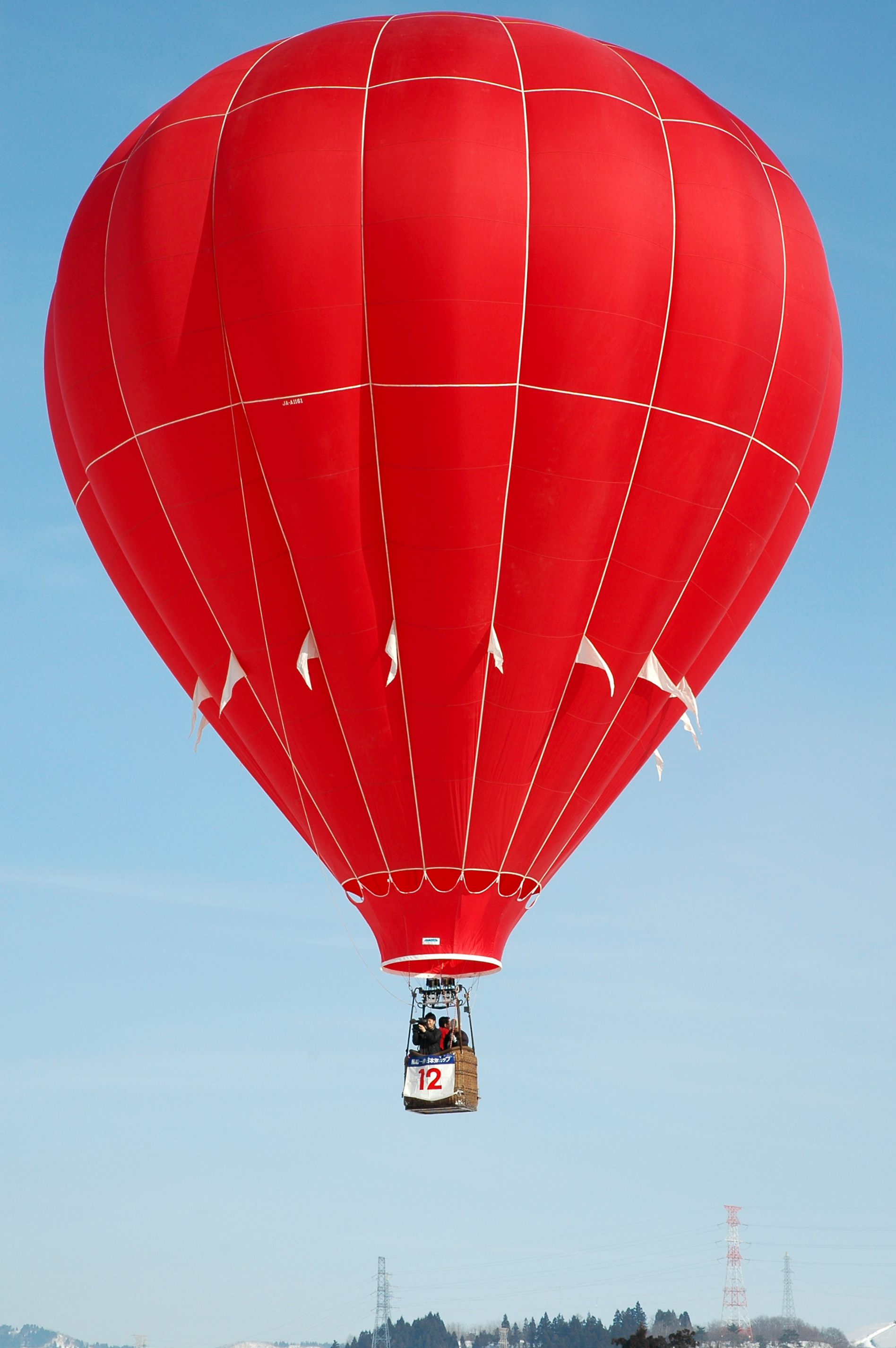
Hot air balloon in flight

The International Civil Aviation Organization (ICAO) defines civil aviation aircraft operations in three categories: General Aviation (GA), Aerial Work (AW) and Commercial Air Transport (CAT). Aerial work operations are separated from general aviation by ICAO by this definition. Aerial work is when an aircraft is used for specialized services such as agriculture, construction, photography, surveying, observation and patrol, search and rescue, and aerial advertisement. However, for statistical purposes ICAO includes aerial work within general aviation, and has proposed officially extending the definition of general aviation to include aerial work, to reflect common usage. The proposed ICAO classification includes instructional flying as part of general aviation (non-aerial-work).

The International Council of Aircraft Owner and Pilot Associations (IAOPA) refers to the category as general aviation/aerial work (GA/AW) to avoid ambiguity. Their definition of general aviation includes:

- Corporate aviation: company own-use flight operations
- Fractional ownership operations: aircraft operated by a specialized company on behalf of two or more co-owners
- Business aviation (or travel): self-flown for business purposes
- Personal/private travel: travel for personal reasons/personal transport
- Air tourism: self-flown incoming/outgoing tourism
- Recreational flying: powered/powerless leisure flying activities
- Air sports: aerobatics, air races, competitions, rallies, etc.

General aviation thus includes both commercial and non-commercial activities.

IAOPA's definition of aerial work includes, but is not limited to:

- Agricultural flights, including crop dusting
- Banner towing
- Aerial firefighting
- Medical evacuation
- Pilot training
- Search and rescue
- Sight seeing flights
- Skydiving flights
- Organ transplant transport flights

Commercial air transport includes:

- Scheduled air services
- Non-scheduled air transport
- Air cargo services
- Air taxi operations

However, in some countries, air taxi is regarded as being part of GA/AW.

Private flights are made in a wide variety of aircraft: light and ultra-light aircraft, sport aircraft, homebuilt aircraft, business aircraft (like private jets), gliders and helicopters. Flights can be carried out under both visual flight and instrument flight rules, and can use controlled airspace with permission.

The majority of the world's air traffic falls into the category of general aviation, and most of the world's airports serve GA exclusively. Flying clubs are considered a part of general aviation.

== Geography ==
=== Europe ===
In 2003, the European Aviation Safety Agency was established as the central EU regulator, taking over responsibility for legislating airworthiness and environmental regulation from the national authorities.

==== United Kingdom ====
Of the 21,000 civil aircraft registered in the United Kingdom, 96 percent are engaged in GA operations, and annually the GA fleet accounts for between 1.25 and 1.35 million hours flown. There are 28,000 private pilot licence holders, and 10,000 certified glider pilots. Some of the 19,000 pilots who hold professional licences are also engaged in GA activities. GA operates from more than 1,800 airports and landing sites or aerodromes, ranging in size from large regional airports to farm strips.

GA is regulated by the Civil Aviation Authority. The main focus is on standards of airworthiness and pilot licensing, and the objective is to promote high standards of safety.

=== North America ===
General aviation is particularly popular in North America, with over 6,300 airports available for public use by pilots of general aviation aircraft (around 5,200 airports in the U.S. and over 1,000 in Canada). In comparison, scheduled flights operate from around 560 airports in the U.S. According to the U.S. Aircraft Owners and Pilots Association, general aviation provides more than one percent of the United States' GDP, accounting for 1.3 million jobs in professional services and manufacturing.

== Regulation ==
Most countries have a civil aviation authority that oversees all civil aviation, including general aviation, adhering to the standardized codes of the International Civil Aviation Organization (ICAO).

== Safety ==
Aviation accident rate statistics are necessarily estimates. According to the U.S. National Transportation Safety Board, general aviation in the United States (excluding charter) suffered 1.31 fatal accidents for every 100,000 hours of flying in 2005, compared to 0.016 for scheduled airline flights. In Canada, recreational flying accounted for 0.7 fatal accidents for every 1000 aircraft, while air taxi accounted for 1.1 fatal accidents for every 100,000 hours. More experienced GA pilots appear generally safer, although the relationship between flight hours, accident frequency, and accident rates are complex and often difficult to assess.

A small number of commercial aviation accidents in the United States have involved collisions with general aviation flights, notably TWA Flight 553, Piedmont Airlines Flight 22, Allegheny Airlines Flight 853, PSA Flight 182 and Aeroméxico Flight 498.

== See also ==
- Commercial aviation
- Environmental impact of aviation
- General Aviation Revitalization Act of 1994
- List of current production certified light aircraft
- List of very light jets
- Transport in the European Union
- OpenAirplane (defunct web-based service)
- One Six Right (2005 documentary)
- Private aviation
- Small Airplane Revitalization Act of 2013

Associations

- Aircraft Owners and Pilots Association
- Canadian Owners and Pilots Association
- Experimental Aircraft Association
- General Aviation Manufacturers Association
- National Business Aviation Association
