= Limit load (aeronautics) =

For aircraft specification calculation in aeronautics, limit load (LL) is the maximum design load expected as the maximum load any aircraft will see during its lifetime,

The limit load can be found relatively easily by statistically analysing the data collected during the many hours of logged flights (which is continuously being gathered) but is generally predicted due to service of other aircraft before the design phase.

== See also ==
- Ultimate load
