= Tecnam P96 Golf =

1997 general aviation aircraft by Tecnam

P96 Golf
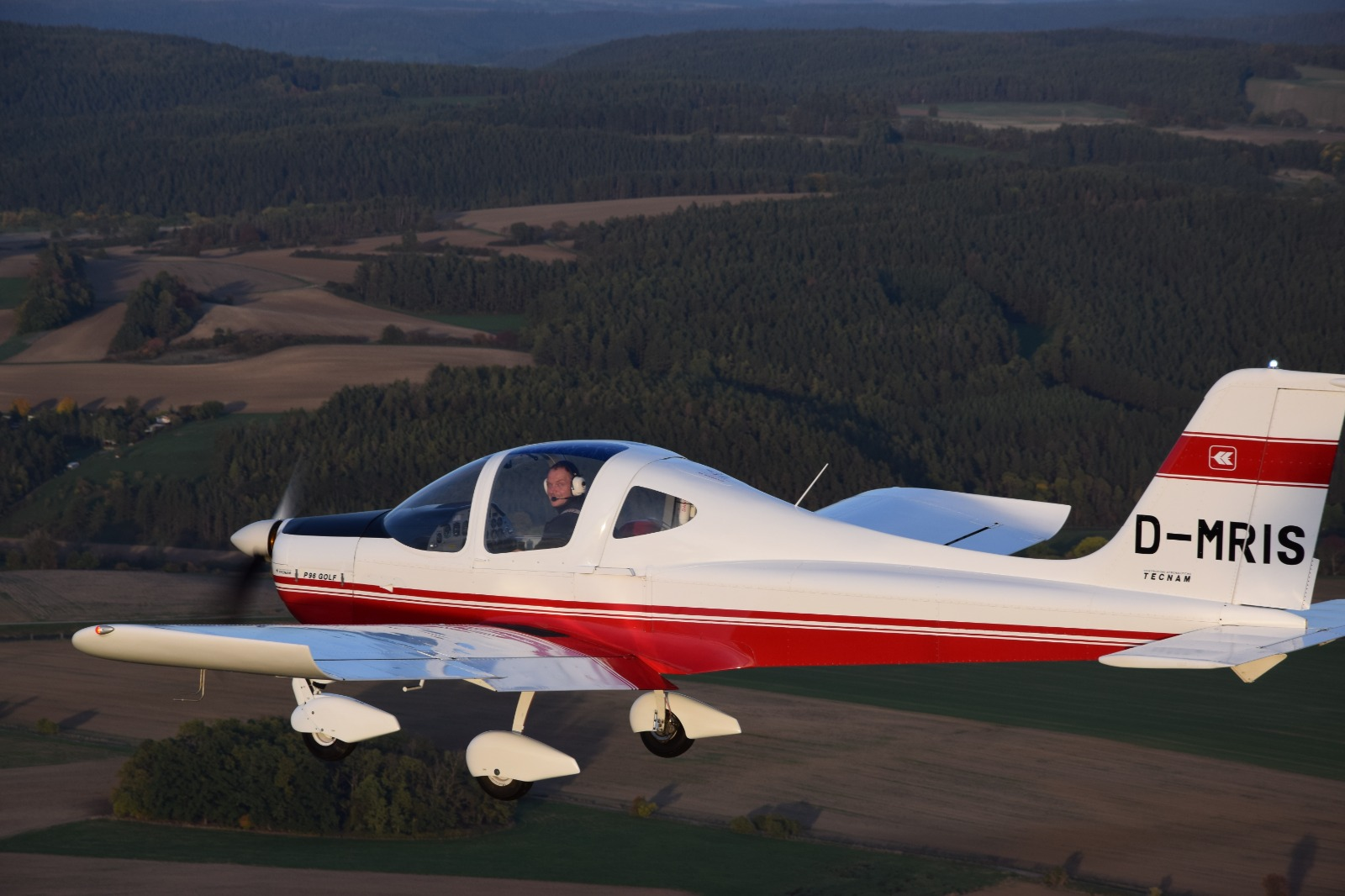
- Tecnam P96 Golf original colors

General information
- Type: Two-seat ultralight monoplane
- National origin: Italy
- Manufacturer: Tecnam
- Designer: Luigi Pascale
- Status: Active

History
- Manufactured: 1996-2006
- Introduction date: 1997
- First flight: 1996

The Tecnam P96 Golf is an Italian all-metal side-by-side two-seat single-engine, low wing light aircraft. It was designed by Luigi Pascale and produced by the Italian general aviation manufacturer Tecnam in Naples between 1997 and 2006. It has been replaced in production by the newer Tecnam P2002 Sierra.

== Design and development ==
In terms of its construction, the Tecnam P96 Golf is relatively conventional, being composed primarily of aluminium. Fibreglass was used for some pieces of the airframe, including the turtle deck and forward cowling. The legs of the landing gear are also composed of steel, which are attached directly to the spar directly underneath the cockpit. The wing tips are also composed of a lightweight composite. While pulled rivets are used across the majority of structural elements, several areas (such as the hinge plate for the ailerons) feature driven rivets instead. Both the ailerons and flaps covered by fabric.

In comparison with typical US-built general aviation aircraft, the interior of the P-96 is relatively spacious. At the pilot's discretion, the canopy can be opened mid-flight; it is secured in place by a total of three catches. Four-point seat belts are also fitted as standard. Rollover protection is incorporated into the trailing edge of the windscreen, which features both carbon and fiberglass construction, while welded steel is present around the cockpit as a protective measure for the aircraft's occupants. Directly aft of the seats is a compact baggage compartment.

The P96 is fitted with a fully steerable nosewheel that is fitted with a rubber shock absorber. The brakes are hydraulically-actuated. An electronic trim system and corresponding position indicator is typically provisioned, although its control implementation differs between early-built and later-built aircraft. While not fitted as standard, various additional avionics have been offered for the P96, including a radio, GPS navigation unit, and a transponder.

In-flight, the P96 has relatively responsive handling, which remains effective even when flown at well beneath cruise speeds. In terms of propulsion, it is typically furnished with either the Rotax 912S, capable of producing up to 100 hp, or the Rotax 912, which produced up to 80 hp.

== Variants ==
A head-on view of a Tecnam P96, 2009

Golf 80
Powered by 59.6 kilowatts (79.9 hp) Rotax 912 UL.
Golf 100
Powered by 73.5 kilowatts (98.6 hp) Rotax 912 ULS engine.

== Specifications (P96 Golf 80) ==
Rear view of a P96

Instrument panel of a P96

Data from Jane's All The World's Aircraft 2003–2004

General characteristics

- Crew: 2
- Length: 6.40 m (21 ft 0 in)
- Wingspan: 8.41 m (27 ft 7 in)
- Height: 2.29 m (7 ft 6 in)
- Wing area: 12.20 m^{2} (131.3 sq ft)
- Empty weight: 281 kg (619 lb)
- Gross weight: 450 kg (992 lb)
- Fuel capacity: 70 L (15 imp gal; 18 US gal)
- Powerplant: 1 × Rotax 912 ULS flat-four engine, 73.5 kW (98.6 hp)
- Propellers: 2-bladed GT-2/173/155, 1.65 m (5 ft 5 in) diameter

Performance

- Maximum speed: 224 km/h (139 mph, 121 kn)
- Cruise speed: 195 km/h (121 mph, 105 kn) (75% power)
- Stall speed: 67 km/h (42 mph, 36 kn) power off and flaps down
- Never exceed speed: 259 km/h (161 mph, 140 kn)
- Range: 740 km (460 mi, 400 nmi)
- Endurance: 4 hours and 30 minutes
- Service ceiling: 4,000 m (13,000 ft)
- Rate of climb: 4.5 m/s (890 ft/min)

== See also ==
Aircraft of comparable role, configuration, and era

- Tecnam P92
