= Tecnam =

Italian aircraft manufacturer

Coordinates: 41.12030°N 14.18444°E

Costruzioni Aeronautiche TECNAM S.p.A.
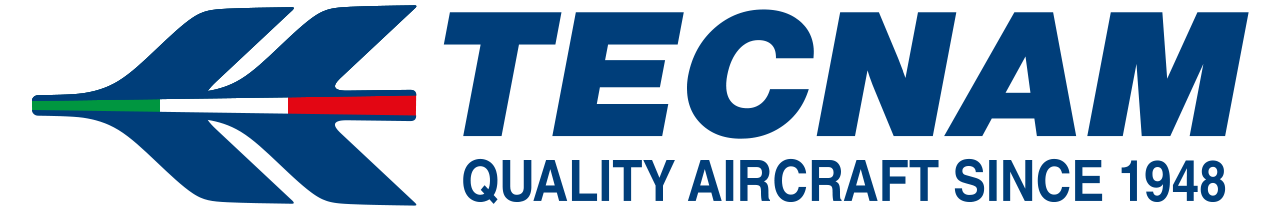
- Type: Private
- Industry: Aerospace
- Founded: 1986
- Founders: Luigi Pascale; Giovanni Pascale
- Headquarters: Via Maiorise, 81043, Capua, Italy
- Number of locations: Tecnam S.p.A. – Capua, Italy (Main headquarters & production); Tecnam US Inc. – Sebring, United States (29536 Flying Fortress Ln, Suite 1, FL 33870)
- Area served: Worldwide
- Key people: Paolo Pascale Langer (CEO); Giovanni Pascale Langer (Managing director)
- Website: tecnam.com

Costruzioni Aeronautiche TECNAM S.p.A., commonly known as Tecnam, is an Italian aircraft manufacturer. As of 2025, Tecnam has delivered over 7,500 aircraft worldwide and employs more than 500 people across its facilities in Capua and the Naples area. The company operates its main production site adjacent to the Oreste Salomone Airport in Capua. Tecnam ranks among the top manufacturers of piston-powered general aviation aircraft by unit deliveries, according to the General Aviation Manufacturers Association.

The company was founded in 1986 by the two Italian brothers Luigi Pascale and Giovanni Pascale, veteran aircraft designers and manufacturers. Prior to creating Tecnam, they had established Partenavia Costruzioni Aeronautiche in 1957.

After the Italian government, acquired control of Partenavia in 1981, the Pascale brothers founded Tecnam as an independent venture in 1986.

As the demand for light-sport and ultralight aircraft began to grow in the late 1980s and early 1990s, Tecnam gradually transitioned from subcontracting to developing its own aircraft. The Tecnam P92, the company’s first original aircraft design, marked its entry into the light aviation sector.

Following the success of the P92, Tecnam expanded its product line to include a range of certified and light-sport aircraft aimed at both general aviation and professional training markets. These include the P2002 Sierra and the P2008, both two-seat trainers, the P2006T, a four-seat twin-engine aircraft commonly used by flight schools, and the P2010, a high-wing single-engine model.

The company also developed the P2012 Traveller, an 11-seat twin-engine commuter aircraft intended for regional and on-demand air services. First delivered in 2019, the P2012 has entered service with operators including Cape Air and Southern Airways Express. In 2022, Tecnam introduced the P-Mentor, a two-seat training aircraft, developed to support both basic and instrument training.

The company also operates sales and delivery facilities in Sebring, Florida, United States and Australia. Tecnam aircraft are currently in use by flight training organizations, commercial airlines, and government institutions in more than 65 countries. Tecnam remains privately owned and family-run; following the deaths of the founding brothers Luigi and Giovanni Pascale, leadership has passed to Luigi’s nephew Paolo Pascale (CEO) and his son Giovanni (Director of Operations).

== History ==
=== Early activities ===
Before founding Tecnam, brothers Luigi and Giovanni Pascale had been active in aircraft design since the late 1940s. Their first complete aircraft, the P48 Astore, flew in 1951 and was built in a small workshop in Naples,

In 1957, they established Partenavia Costruzioni Aeronautiche, producing a series of general aviation aircraft including the P57 Fachiro, the P64 Oscar, and the twin-engine P68, which became one of Italy’s most exported light aircraft. The aircraft designation “P” (standing for Pascale) became a consistent feature across their aircraft designs, a tradition that continues at Tecnam today. Partenavia became one of the most prominent Italian light aircraft manufacturers of the 20th century before being acquired by the Italian government through the aerospace company Aeritalia and the holding Fime, in 1981, prompting the Pascale brothers to launch a new independent venture: Tecnam.

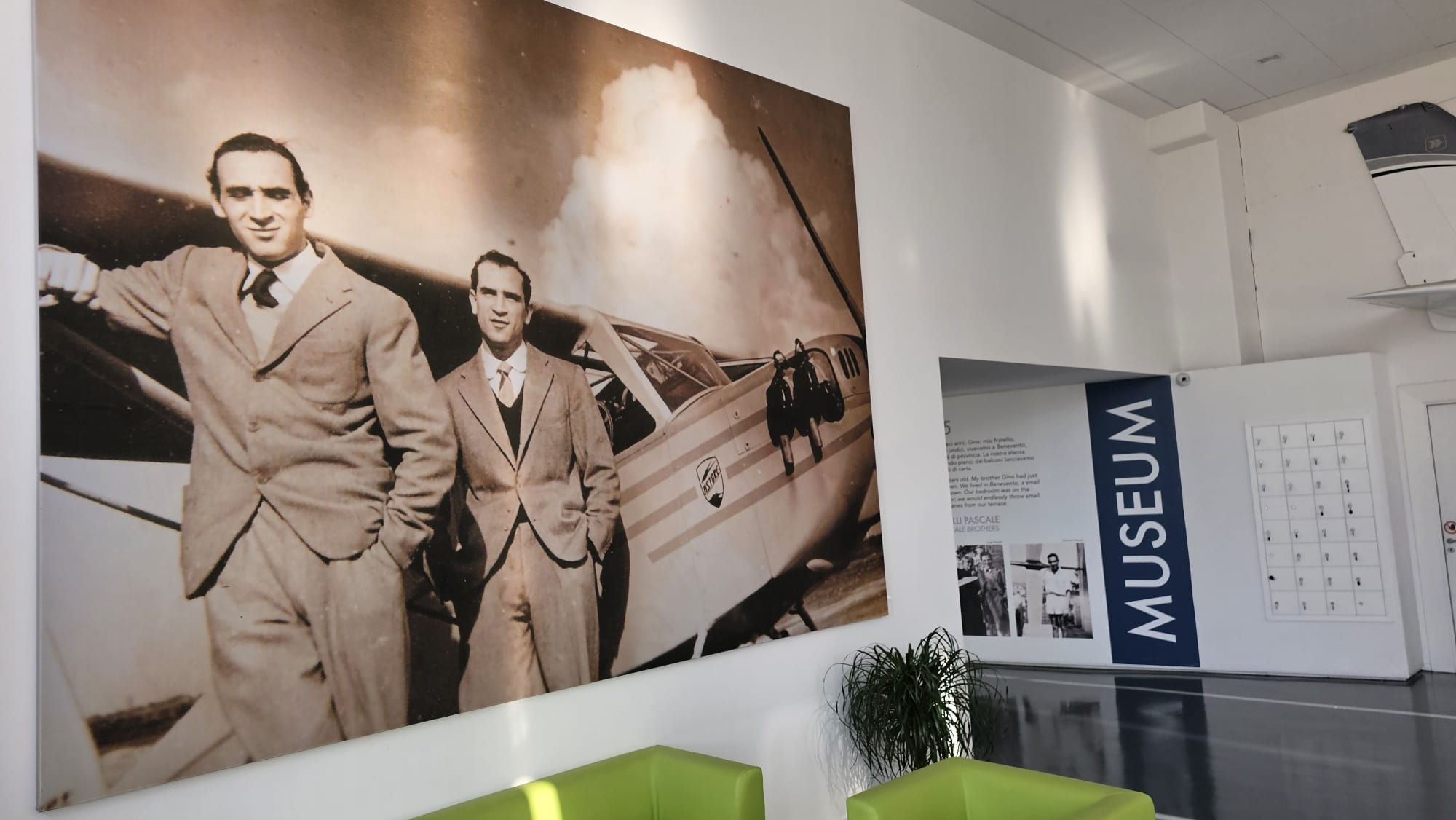
The history of the Pascale brothers and their activity with Partenavia and Tecnam is the main topic of the Tecnam Museum in Capua.

=== The founding of Tecnam ===
Luigi and Giovanni Pascale founded Costruzioni Aeronautiche TECNAM S.p.A. in 1986, following their departure from Partenavia. Initially established as a subcontractor, Tecnam began its operations in modest premises in Naples, producing fuselages for the Partenavia P.68.

A key milestone in Tecnam’s early history came when Aeritalia subcontracted the company to manufacture the tailplanes for the ATR 42 regional aircraft. The project required compliance with FAR 25 commercial certification standards, providing Tecnam with its first experience in large-scale certified production. As part of the collaboration, Aeritalia technicians trained Tecnam staff in advanced assembly techniques, including a sealing process developed by Aérospatiale—applying a continuous thread of sealant to sheet metal joints before riveting. This method, originally introduced for the ATR, remains in use at Tecnam today

With the proceeds from these contracts, the Pascale built a new facility near Naples Capodichino Airport, where Tecnam expanded its activities to include the manufacture of fuselage panels for the McDonnell Douglas MD-80. These early projects not only secured the company’s financial foundation but also prepared Tecnam for a future shift to aircraft design and production.

=== The 1990s and Tecnam's first model: the P92 ===
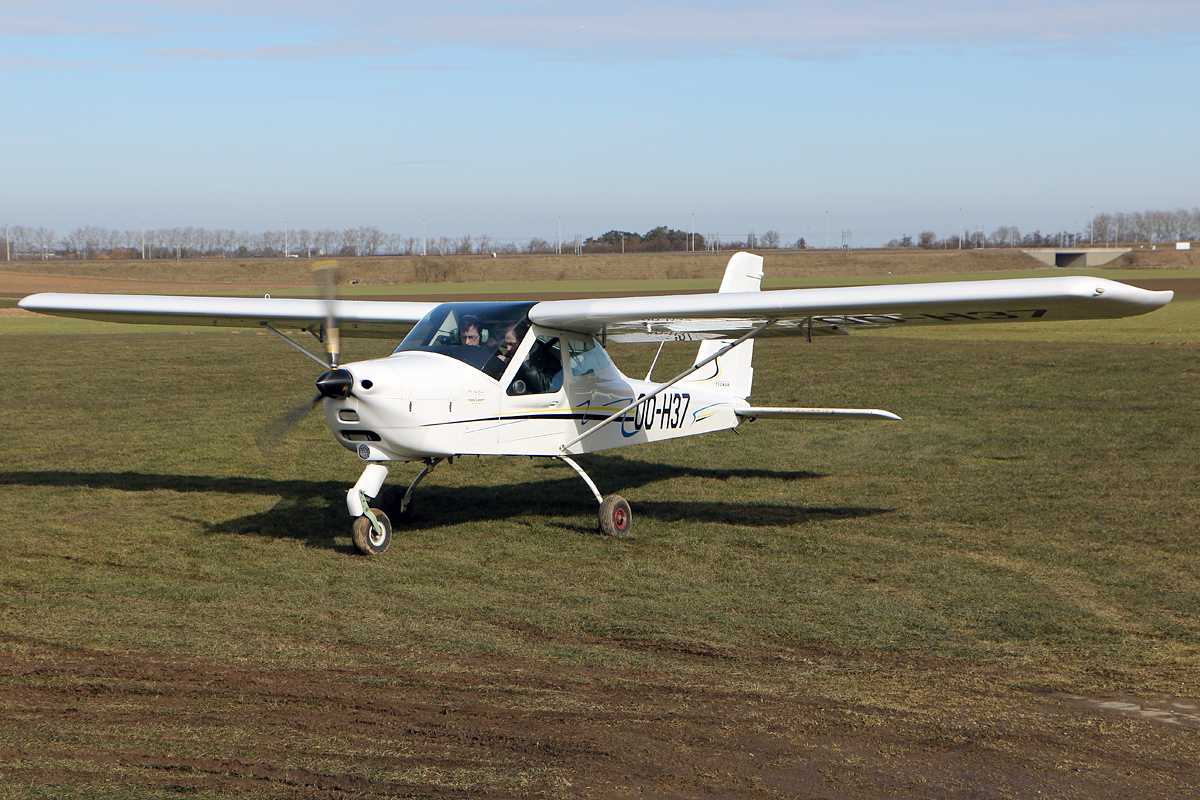
Tecnam P92, the company's first aircraft

In the early 1990s, Tecnam shifted its focus from subcontracting to full aircraft design and manufacturing. The transition was encouraged by the introduction of Italian Law 106/1985, which legalized recreational flight with ultralight aircraft and created new market opportunities. Led by Paolo Pascale, the second generation of the family, the company began designing what would become the Tecnam P92 a two-seat, high-wing, all-metal ultralight aircraft intended to serve both private pilots and flight schools.

The P92 prototype, conducted its maiden flight on 14 March 1993 at Capua airfield. Powered by a 64 hp Rotax 582 engine and featuring a maximum take-off weight of 450 kg, the aircraft incorporated technical solutions previously developed by the Pascale brothers, including the distinctive all-moving tailplane (stabilator) used in several Partenavia aircraft. The structure was based on traditional riveted aluminium construction, chosen for its reliability, ease of inspection, and maintainability in the field.

The aircraft debuted at the Bassano del Grappa Air Show shortly after its first flight and was well received by pilots and operators alike. Despite initial internal scepticism about the viability of entering a new segment, the P92 became the company’s most successful model throughout the 1990s. It was produced in numerous configurations, including models compliant with ultralight, light-sport aircraft, and very light aircraft certification categories across Europe and the United States.

Thanks to its accessible flight characteristics and low operating costs, the P92 was gradually adopted by numerous flying clubs and flight training organizations. Over the years, Tecnam introduced several updated variants of the aircraft, including the P92-J, P92 Echo Super, P92 Eaglet, and P92 MkII, each featuring incremental improvements in avionics, aerodynamics, materials (including composite fuselages), and cabin comfort. According to aviation journalist Dan Johnson, over 2,500 units were in service worldwide by 2018, making it Tecnam's most successful model in terms of production numbers.

The 90' also marked a generational transition within Tecnam. Paolo Pascale, increasingly took the lead in the company’s commercial and strategic direction, while the founding brothers remained closely involved in design and development. Giovanni Pascale died on 16 March 1999 after a long illness.

=== 2000s: Expansion into Certified Aircraft and Twin-Engine Development ===
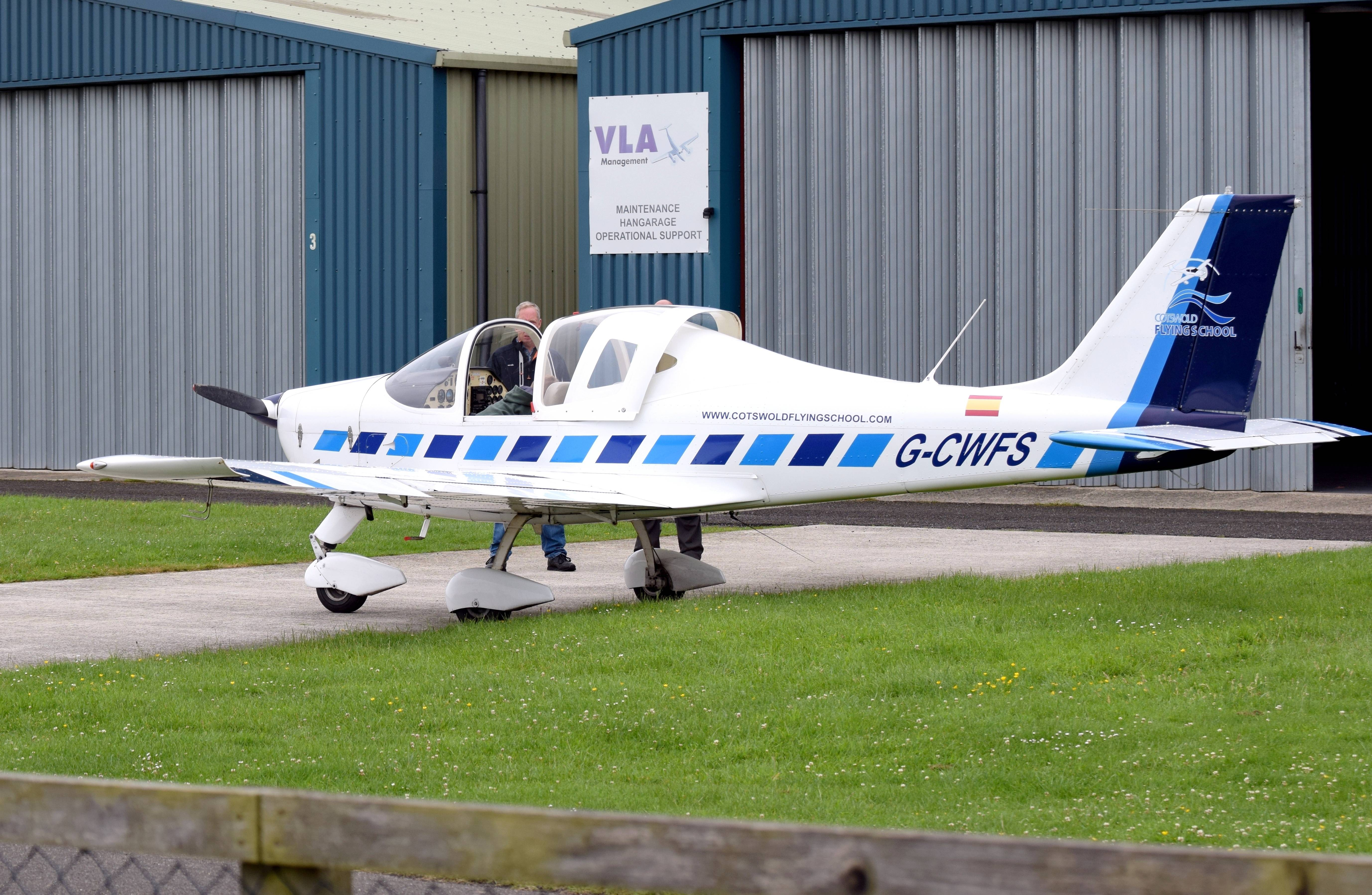
Tecnam P2002 Sierra at Cotswold Airport, Gloucestershire, England, 2016

In the early 2000s, Tecnam introduced the P2002 Sierra, a two-seat, low-wing aircraft developed for recreational flying and pilot training. By 2005, one particular aircraft, the Tecnam P2002 Sierra, had risen to prominence in Tecnam's line-up, the company having dedicated around 70 percent of its total aircraft production capacity to manufacturing the Sierra alone. By this point, the aircraft was being produced at a rate of six per week, while the company claimed to have an order backlog spanning the following six months. Furthermore, the Sierra could also be supplied in a near 'ready to go' configuration suited to the European trainer market, which was one reported consequence of having secured its very light aircraft certification. By mid-2005, Tecnam had reportedly completed delivery of roughly 180 Sierras.

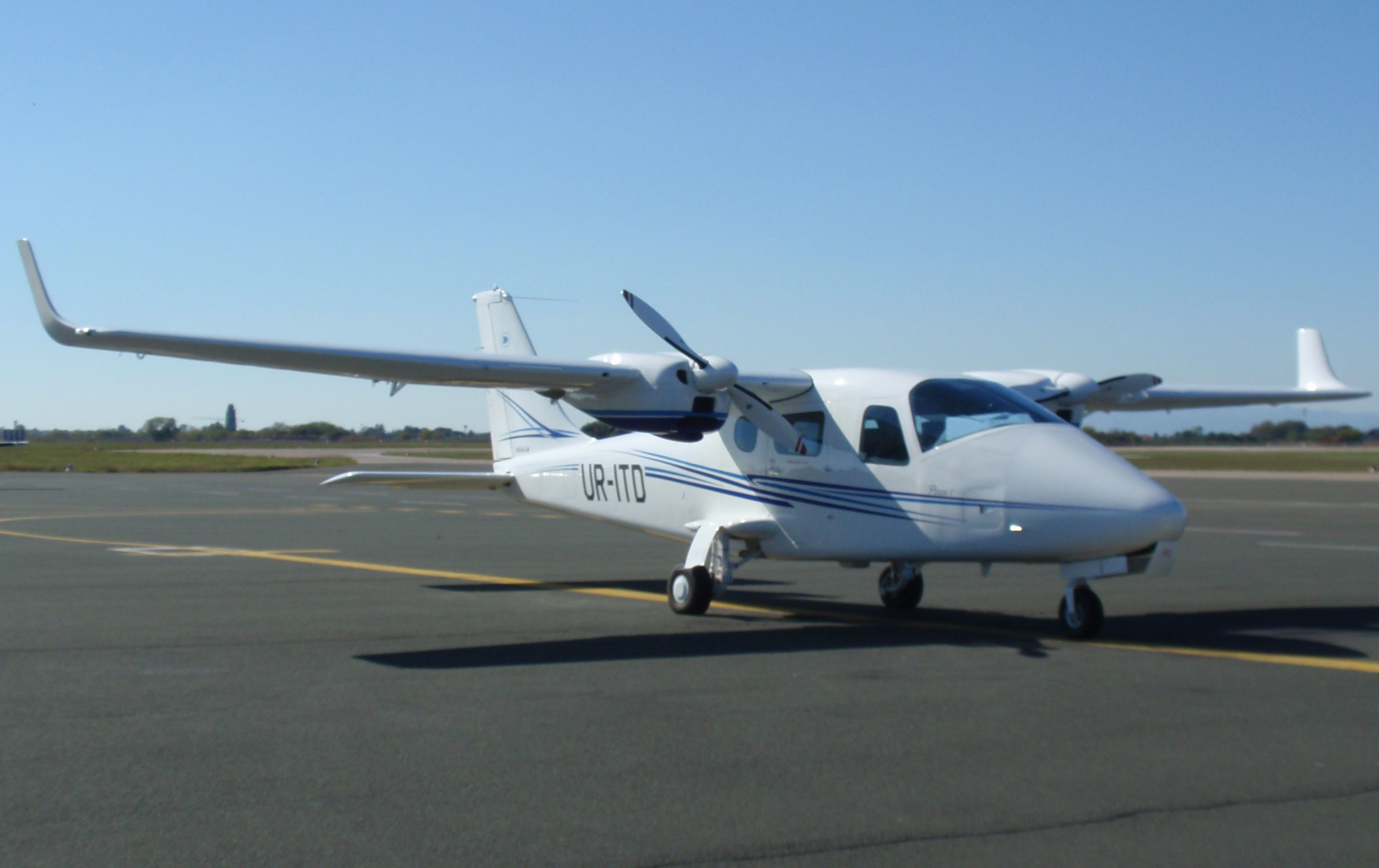
Tecnam P2006T

The Tecnam P2006T, a four-seat twin engine aircraft, made its maiden flight in 2007. It is powered by a pair of 100 hp Rotax 912S piston engines, driving variable pitch propellers, and retractable landing gear. The P2006T was certified by the European Union Aviation Safety Agency (EASA) during 2009, while Part 23 certification was issued by the Federal Aviation Administration during the following year. In addition to its general aviation usage like touring and training, the P2006T can be operated in other capacities, including as a maritime patrol aircraft, a specially furnished multi-mission model has been developed for military uses.

In parallel, Tecnam expanded its industrial infrastructure with new production hangars and equipment at its Capua facility. These developments enabled the company to support the design, testing, and certification of more complex aircraft, and marked a transition toward higher-volume manufacturing within the certified general aviation segment.

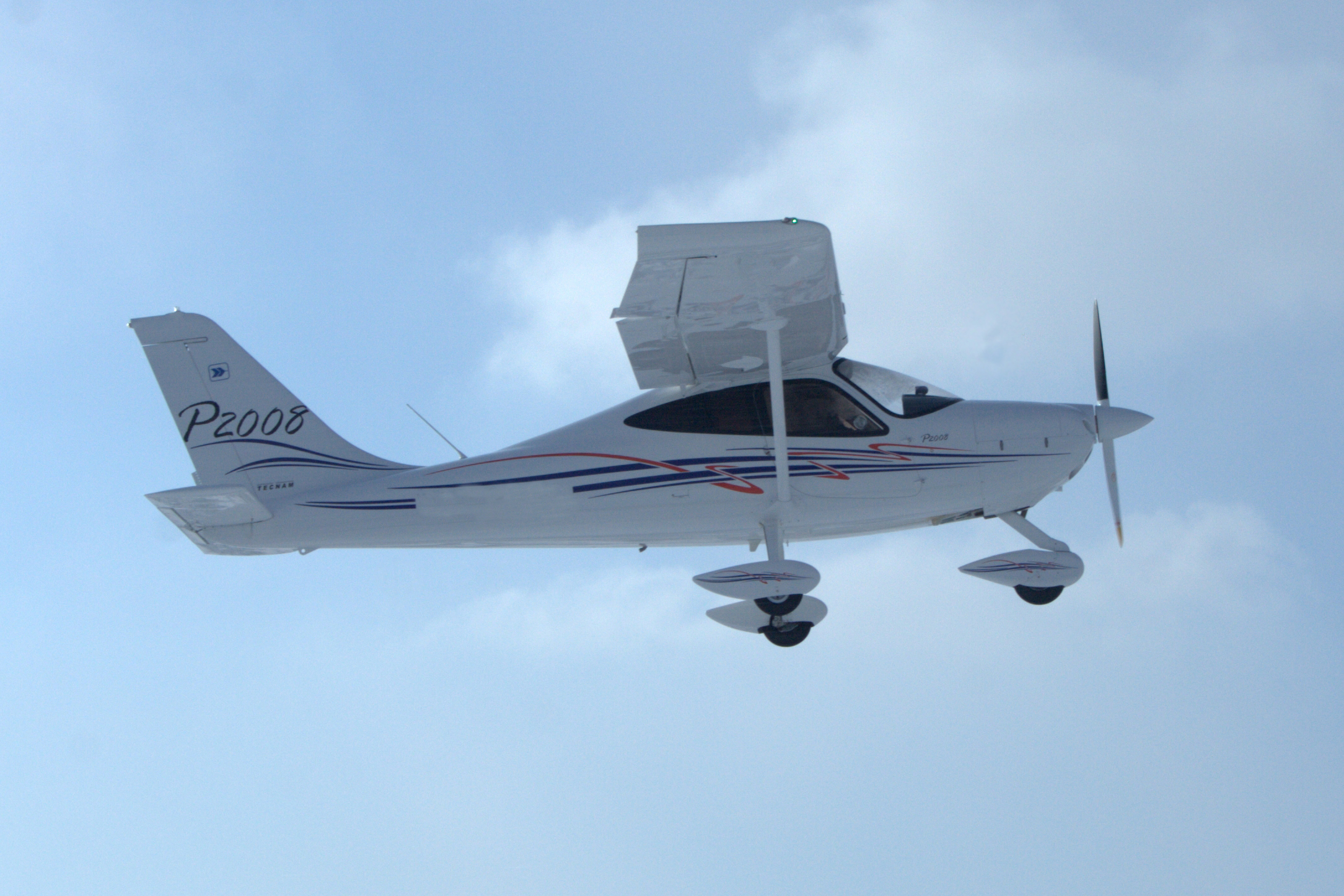
Tecnam P2008

During the late 2000s, the company also developed the Tecnam P2008, performing its maiden flight on September 30, 2008. It is notable for being the first Tecnam-built aircraft to incorporate major composite components, such as its carbon fibre fuselage. It is otherwise conventional, using a traditional strut braced high-wing monoplane configuration, being powered by a single Rotax 912ULS flat four piston engine, and furnished with a fixed tricycle undercarriage. During December 2009, the firm made its first deliveries of the P2008.

The model was initially designed for the light-sport aircraft category, primarily targeting the U.S. and other non-certified markets. Subsequently, Tecnam developed the P2008JC, a certified version of the aircraft meeting EASA CS-VLA standards. While visually and structurally similar to the base P2008, the P2008JC is equipped with additional instrumentation and certification documentation required for use in flight schools and commercial training environments within Europe.

=== 2010s: introduction of composite structures and entry into regional transport ===
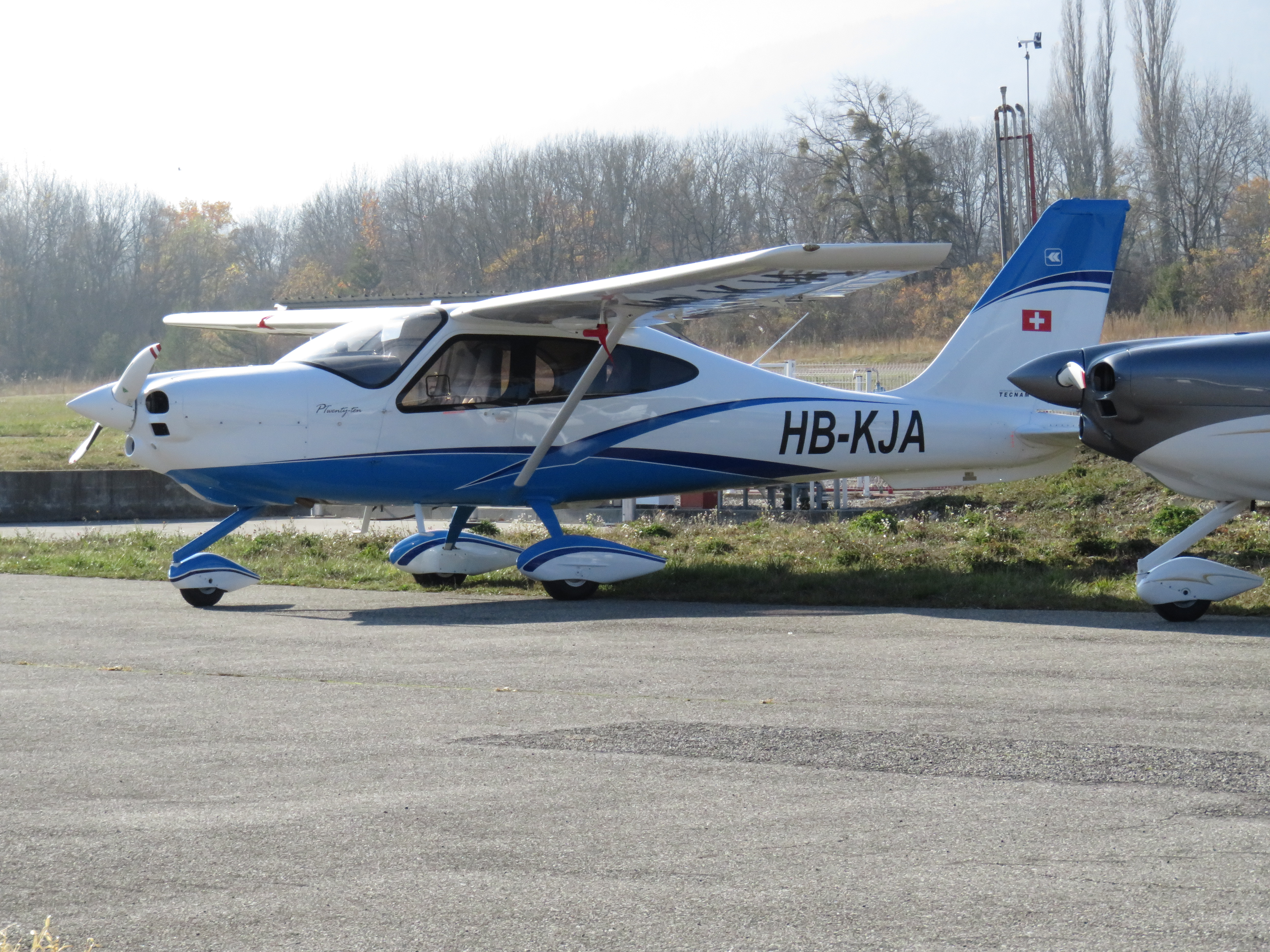
Tecnam P2010

Building on the P2008 experience with composites, Tecnam developed the P2010, a four-seat, high-wing aircraft with a carbon-fiber fuselage and metal wings. Designed for private aviation and training markets, the P2010 received European certification in 2014 and U.S. Federal Aviation Administration certification in 2015. The model introduced modern avionics and a more spacious cabin compared to earlier Tecnam aircraft, positioning it alongside other certified general aviation aircraft in the CS-23 category.

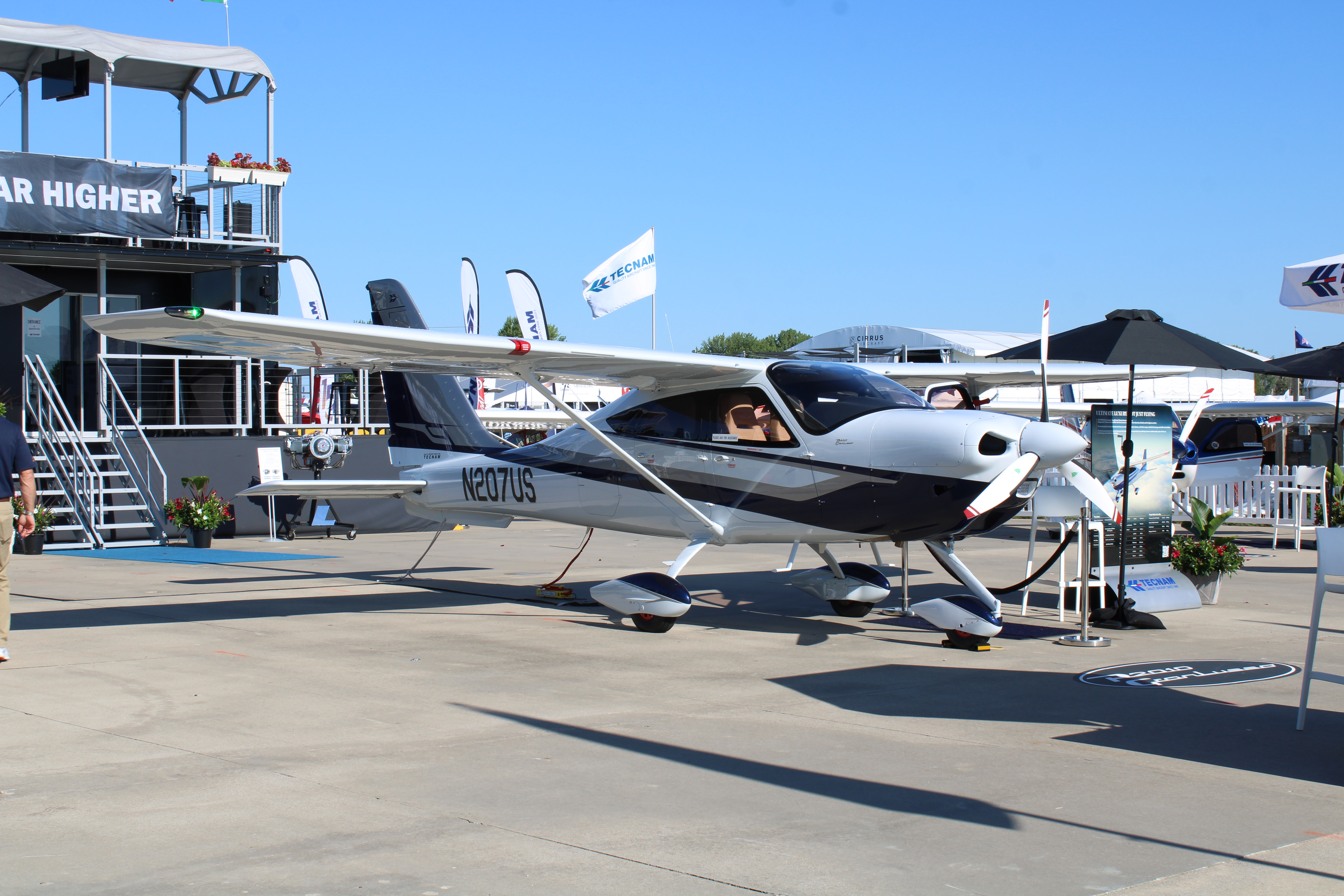
Tecnam P2010 TDI at EAA, Oshkosh 2023

Initially offered with a 180 hp Lycoming IO-360 engine, Tecnam later introduced new variants: a 215 hp version with the Lycoming IO-390 was certified in 2018, followed by a diesel-powered variant, the P2010 TDI, equipped with a 170 hp Continental CD-170 engine, certified in 2020. These updates aimed to improve fuel efficiency and range, particularly for flight schools and long-distance private operations.

Throughout the 2010s, Tecnam developed their first commercial aircraft, the P2012 Traveller the last project being designed by, professor Luigi Pascale; it is being marketed towards the commuter airliner, VIP, cargo, parachuting and medevac sectors of the market. Publicly revealed in April 2011, and having performed its maiden flight on July 21, 2016 in collaboration with the U.S. regional airline Cape Air.

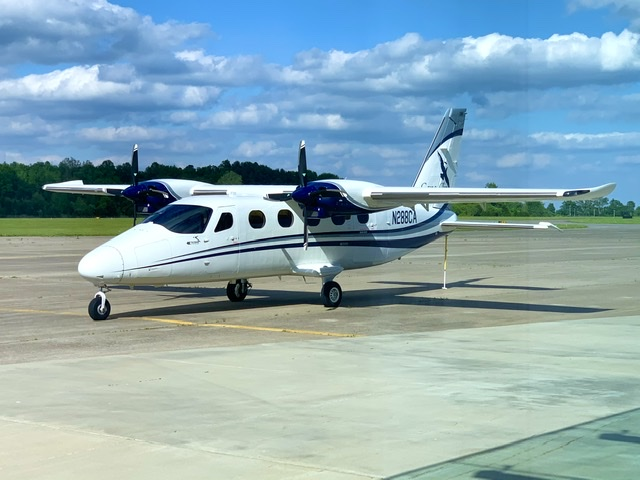
Tecnam P2012 Traveller, the company's first commercial aircraft

Professor Luigi Pascale, co-founder of Tecnam and head of design, died in March 2017 at the age of 93. Until shortly before his death, he remained actively involved in the development of the P2012, which was the last aircraft he personally contributed to. The first two aircraft were delivered in 2019 after a transatlantic ferry flight from Italy to Massachusetts, piloted by Giovanni Pascale, the company's Managing Director and Luigi's nephew.

The P2012 received type certification from the Federal Aviation Administration during August 2019, as of 2017, the company can reportedly produce up to 40 P2012s per year. Tecnam has forecast a demand for 11,500 short-haul commuter aircraft between 2018 and 2028.

During October 2015, the company announced that it has formed a partnership with Chinese aircraft manufacturer Liaoning United Aviation, a division of Shenyang Aircraft Corporation, to produce the Chinese-certified P2006T at its facility adjacent to Faque Airport in China, for delivery to customers throughout the Chinese market, including Hong Kong, Macao and Taiwan. Additional aircraft, including the two-seat Tecnam P2008JC and the four-seat Tecnam P2010, shall also be produced at the same facility once certified by local authorities.

During 2017, Tecnam reportedly built around 200 aircraft; it had a target to build a similar amount during the following year. According to aerospace periodical Flight International, the firm's recent sales have been dominated by two aircraft, the four-seat P2006 and two-seat P2008. During 2018, the company stated that it is considering establishing additional production capacity, including another factory, if demand for its aircraft justifies the investment involved in undertaking such an expansion.

=== 2020s: recent developments ===
Between 2020 and 2025, Tecnam continued to diversify its product line. In 2021 Tecnam launched the P2012 Sentinel SMP, a special mission platform derived from the P2012 Traveller, designed for surveillance and intelligence roles. It introduced enhancements such as increased payload capacity, cabin operator stations, and approval for flight in known icing (FIKI) conditions. Additionally, Tecnam partnered with Leonardo to integrate the Airborne Tactical Observation and Surveillance system into the Sentinel SMP, enhancing its intelligence, surveillance, and reconnaissance (ISR) capabilities.

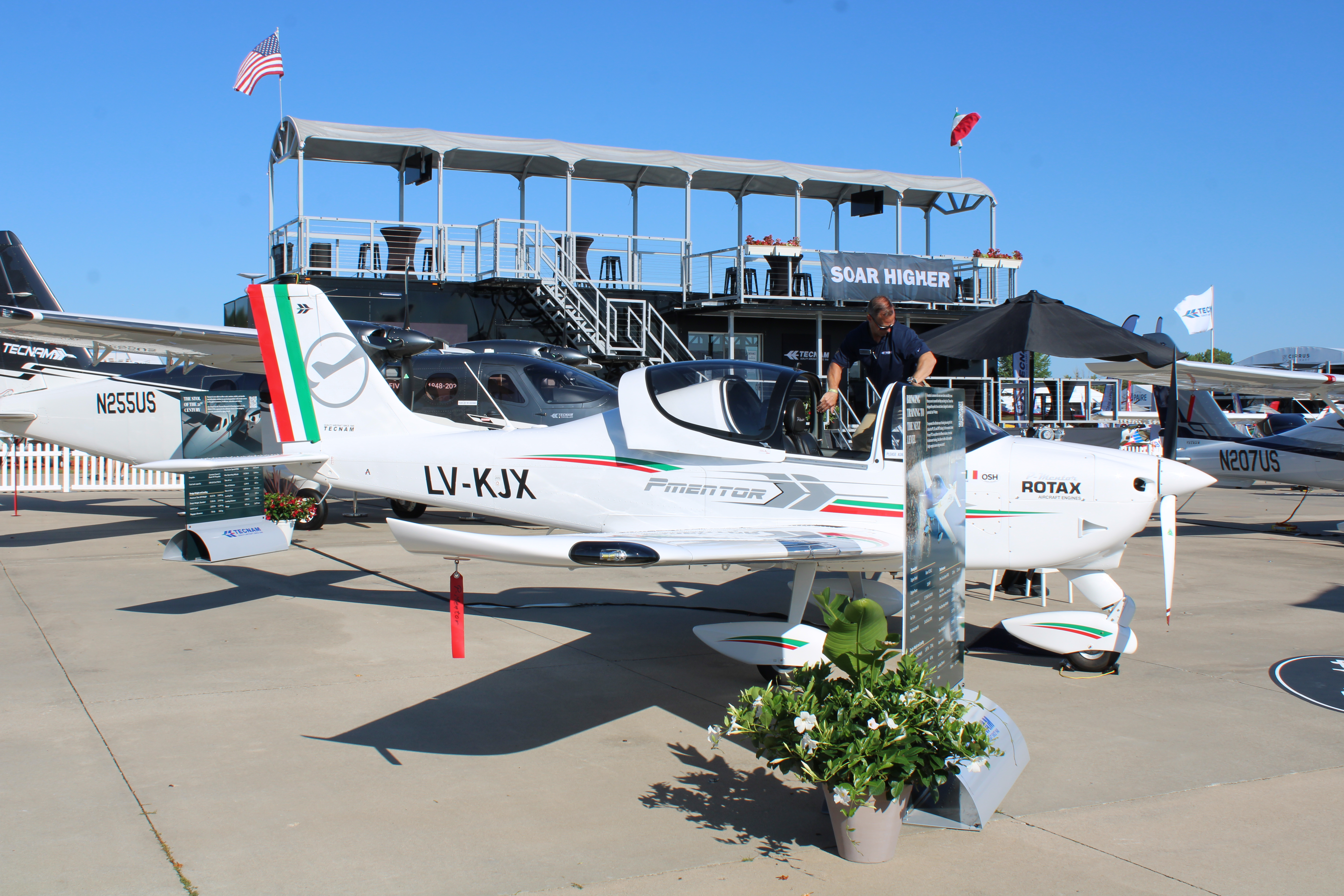
Tecnam P-Mentor at EAA 2023, Oshkosh

In 2022, Tecnam introduced the P-Mentor, a two-seat IFR-certified trainer intended to replace aging school fleets. Powered by a Rotax 912iSc engine and equipped with Garmin G3X avionics, the aircraft received EASA certification in April 2022 and Federal Aviation Administration certification in 2024.

During 2022, Tecnam also unveiled the Gran Lusso, a premium variant of the P2010. Developed by the company’s in-house design team, the Gran Lusso version introduced an upgraded interior with enhanced ergonomics, materials, and acoustic insulation, targeting private owners seeking increased comfort and refinement.

In 2023, Tecnam introduced the P2012 STOL (Short Takeoff and Landing), a variant of the P2012 Traveller featuring an extended wingspan of 16.6 meters and two Continental GTSIO-520-S engines. The P2012 STOL was developed to address the requirements of operators engaged in regional and remote connectivity, particularly in areas with limited airport infrastructure. For instance, the Seychelles Islands Development Company (IDC) has adopted the P2012 STOL to improve air connectivity between Mahé and remote islands like Ile Desroches and Farquhar.

In 2023, Tecnam marked its 75th anniversary, commemorating the foundation of the company’s legacy by Luigi and Giovanni Pascale, who designed their first aircraft, the P48 Astore, in 1948.That same year, the P-Mentor, Tecnam’s IFR-certified two-seat trainer, received the Fliegermagazin Award for Best Aircraft at the AERO Friedrichshafen exhibition. In 2024, it was further recognized with both the Editor's Choice and Innovation Awards by Flying Magazine.

The P2006T NG, a next-generation update of Tecnam’s twin-engine aircraft, was presented in 2024 and certified by EASA in early 2025. That same year, the company introduced additional P2012 variants with Continental engine options.

In February 2026, Tecnam launched the MOSAIK59 product family, a series of aircraft designed to comply with the FAA’s Modernization of Special Airworthiness Certification (MOSAIC) rules for light sport aircraft. The MOSAIK59 family includes updated versions of Tecnam’s existing models, such as the P92 Echo MKII, P2008 Next Generation, Astore GT, P2010, and P2006T NG. These aircraft are built to meet the 59‑knot stall speed requirement and the expanded privileges available to sport pilots under MOSAIC. Tecnam indicated that the MOSAIK59 lineup aims to provide flight schools and sport pilots with versatile, performance-oriented options that align with the new regulatory framework.

== Products ==
Tecnam’s aircraft portfolio spans a wide spectrum of general and commercial aviation, including single- and twin-engine piston aircraft designed for training, touring, and regional transport. Since the introduction of its first certified aircraft in the early 1990s, the company has steadily expanded its product range to include Light Sport Aircraft, certified trainers, and utility aircraft capable of passenger, cargo, and special mission operations. As of 2025, Tecnam has 33 different models and variants and has delivered over 7,500 aircraft worldwide.

Model name	First flight	Number built	Type
Tecnam P92	1993	2500	Single piston engine monoplane utility airplane
Tecnam P96 Golf	1996		Single piston engine monoplane utility airplane
Tecnam P2002 Sierra	2002	1000	Single piston engine monoplane utility airplane
Tecnam P2004 Bravo	2002		Single piston engine monoplane utility airplane
Tecnam P2006T	2007	578	Twin piston engine monoplane utility airplane
Tecnam P2008	2008	600	Single piston engine monoplane utility airplane
Tecnam P2010	2012	245	Single piston engine monoplane utility airplane
Tecnam P2010 TDI	2020		Single piston engine monoplane utility airplane
Tecnam Astore	2013	30	Single piston engine monoplane utility airplane
Tecnam P2012 Traveller	2016		Twin piston engine monoplane utility airplane
Tecnam Gran Lusso	2022		Single piston engine monoplane utility airplane
Tecnam P2012 STOL	2024		Twin piston engine monoplane utility airplane
Tecnam P-Mentor	2022		Single piston engine monoplane trainer

== Facilities ==
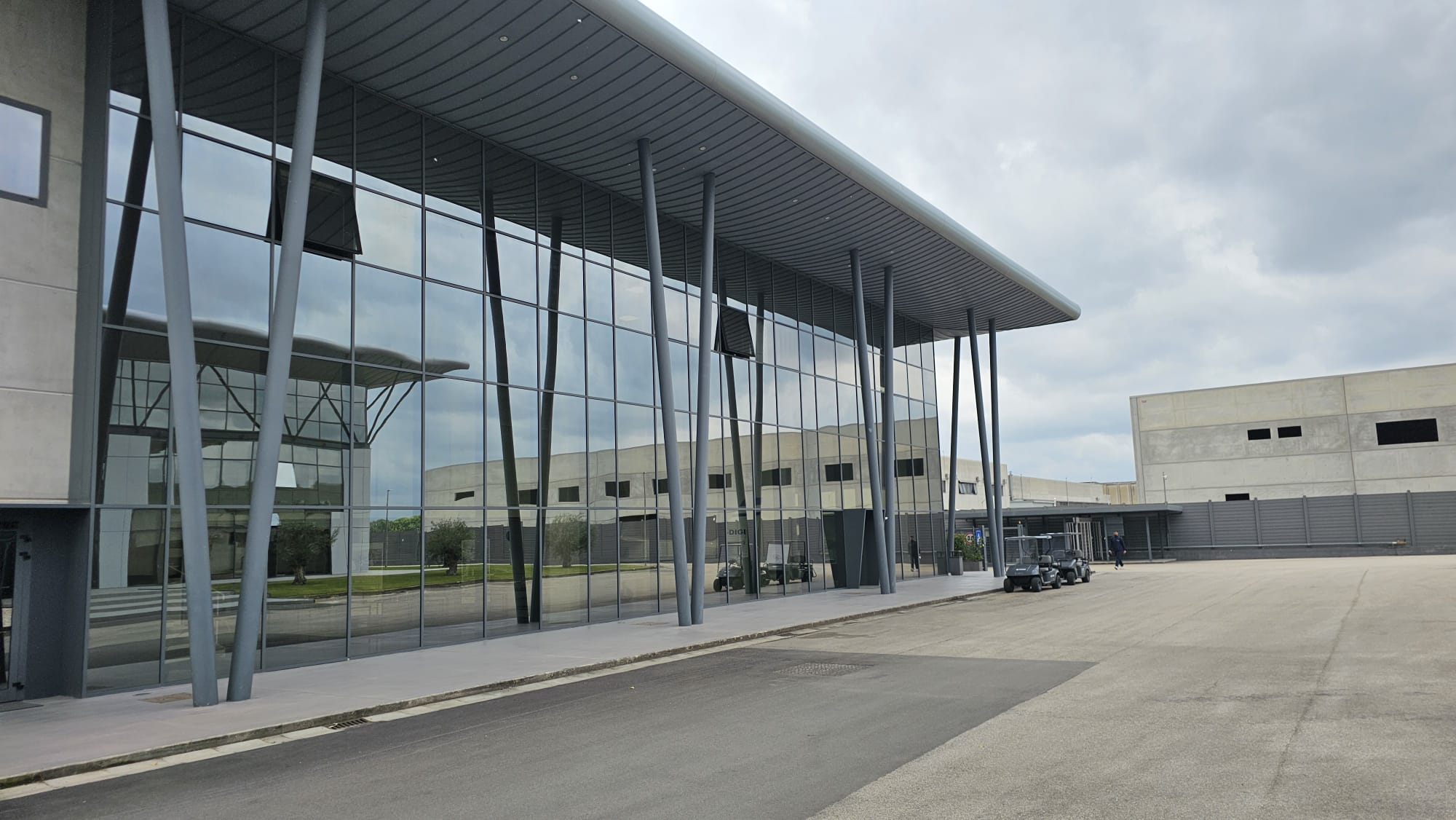
Tecnam headquarters - Capua, Italy

Tecnam headquarters and main production facility are located in Capua, Italy, near the Oreste Salomone Airport. The Capua site spans 60,000 square meters and houses administrative offices, production lines, a flight test center, and design and certification departments. It supports the assembly of Tecnam’s full aircraft range.

A newer 16,000 m² production building and a dedicated flight test hangar are part of ongoing expansion efforts. As of 2025, Tecnam employs over 500 people in the Capua and Naples region, with plans to increase this to over 600. A secondary site in Casoria, near Naples International Airport, specializes in composite material manufacturing and precision mechanical components. An additional assembly plant, also in Capua, focuses on airframe production and supports streamlined logistics within Tecnam’s manufacturing ecosystem.

Outside Italy, Tecnam US Inc. operates from Sebring, Florida, supporting the North American market with sales, reassembly, customer support, and spare parts logistics. The 21,000 sq-ft facility includes a service center and delivery operations. Tecnam previously operated a direct subsidiary in Australia, which has since transitioned into a network of authorized dealers and service providers.

Tecnam supports global sales and service through a network of over 65 dealers and 125 service centers in more than 65 countries.

The company’s facilities also support a broad range of R&D collaborations, including hybrid and electric propulsion projects with Rolls-Royce, NASA, and Rotax.

== See also ==
- Diamond Aircraft Industries
- List of Italian companies
