= Tecnam P2008 =

Single engine light aircraft

P2008
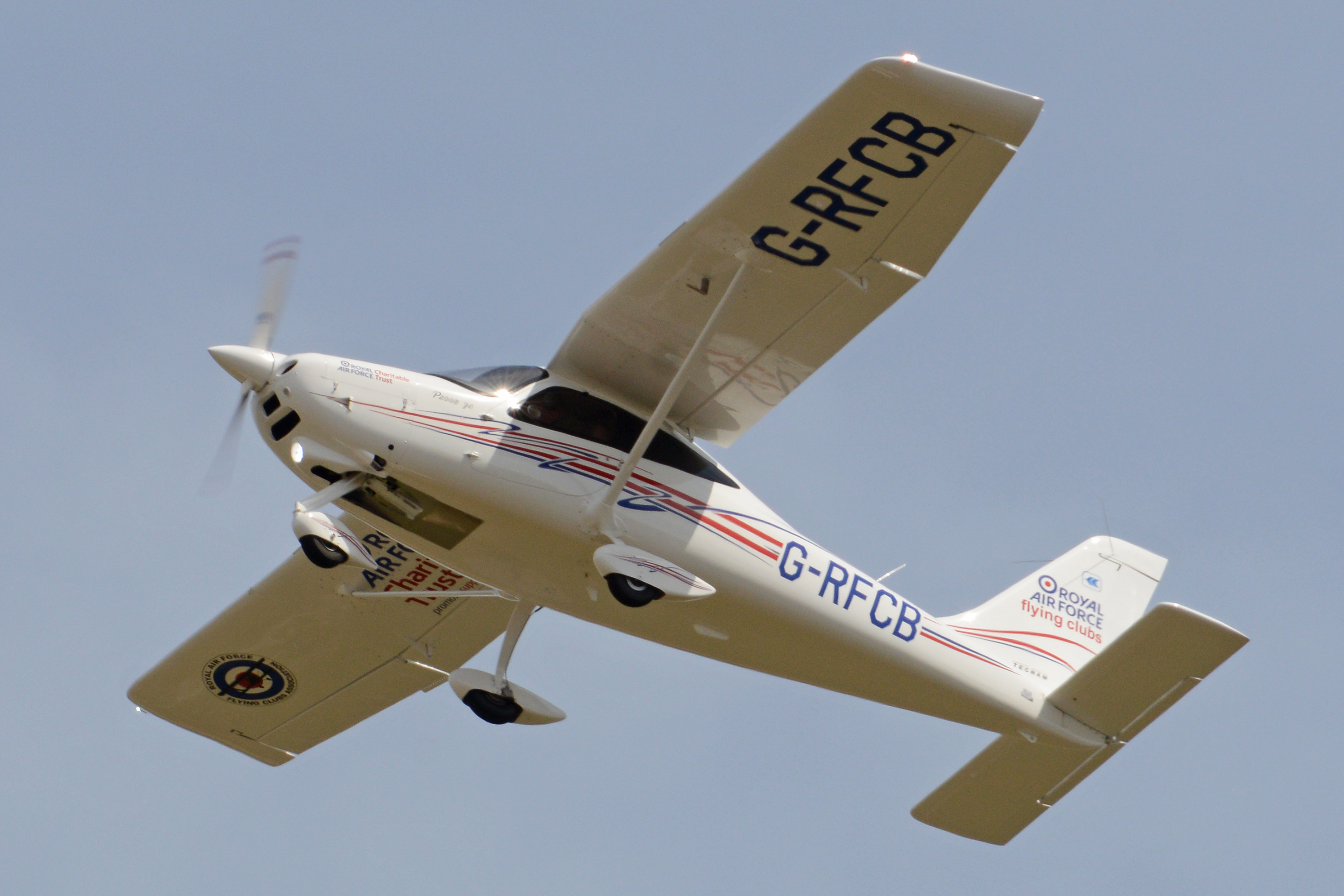
- P2008 JC

General information
- Type: Light aircraft
- National origin: Italy
- Manufacturer: Costruzione Aeronautiche Tecnam
- Status: Active

History
- Manufactured: 2008-present
- Introduction date: 2009
- First flight: 30 September 2008
- Developed into: Tecnam P2010

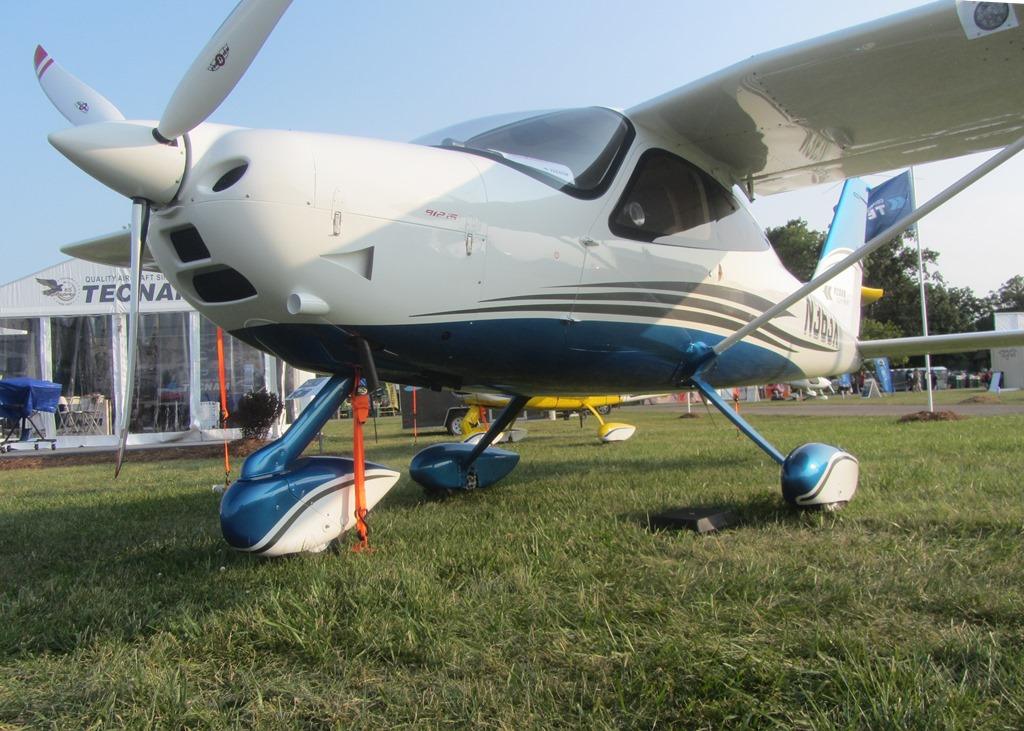
Tecnam P2008

The Tecnam P2008 is a single-engine, high-wing two-seat aircraft built by Tecnam in Italy but aimed at the US market. It is the first Tecnam aircraft to incorporate major composite components. It was introduced at the AERO Friedrichshafen 2009 show, with first deliveries in December 2009.

== Design and development ==
The P2008 is a conventionally laid out strut braced high-wing monoplane aimed specifically at the US market. Resembling the earlier Tecnam P92 and P2004 in general appearance, the P2008 differs by introducing a carbon fibre fuselage and integrated fin. The wings and tailplane are all-metal. It can be adapted to LSA, ultralight or ELA1 categories.

The wing leading edge is straight except for some pinching at the root and the wing has constant chord over about the inner 60% of span. Outboard, the trailing edge is tapered; the straight wing tips are slightly upturned. Frise ailerons on piano hinges span the outboard sections and the inner sections are spanned by slotted flaps. There is a single lift strut on each side, attached to the lower fuselage. The P2008 has a low set all-moving constant chord tailplane with an anti-balance tab. The fin is swept and the rudder moves above the tailplane.

The P2008 is powered by a Rotax 912ULS flat four piston engine driving a two blade propeller. The cabin seats two side-by side with a door each side and baggage space behind. The cabin and cabin doors are wider than on earlier Tecnam high-wing aircraft. Its fixed tricycle undercarriage has spring cantilever main legs and a castoring, non-steerable nosewheel on a compressed rubber suspension. Ground steering is achieved by differential braking. All wheels have speed fairings.

The first flight was on 30 September 2008.

== Operational history ==
The first P2008 was delivered to the US in December 2009. By November 2010 six had been registered in Australia, Italy, South Korea and the United States. As of January 2013, five have been registered in New Zealand, including two as Class 2 Microlights.

== Variants ==
P2008
Base model with a 100 hp (75 kW) Rotax 912ULS engine.
P2008 TC
Turbocharged 115 hp (86 kW) Rotax 914 engine with three blade propeller.
P2008 JC
Certified version under EASA CS-VLA rules.

== Specifications ==
Data from Jane's All the World's Aircraft 2011/12

General characteristics

- Capacity: 2
- Length: 6.93 m (22 ft 9 in)
- Wingspan: 8.80 m (28 ft 10 in)
- Height: 2.46 m (8 ft 1 in)
- Wing area: 11.50 m^{2} (123.8 sq ft)
- Aspect ratio: 6.7
- Airfoil: NACA 63A
- Empty weight: 354 kg (780 lb)
- Max takeoff weight: 600 kg (1,323 lb)
- Fuel capacity: 110 L (24.2 Imp gal, 29.0 US gal)
- Powerplant: 1 × Rotax 912S flat four air and water cooled piston, 73.5 kW (98.6 hp)
- Propellers: 2-bladed Tonini GT fixed pitch

Performance

- Cruise speed: 215 km/h (134 mph, 116 kn) economical, 65% power at 2,286 m (7,500 ft)
- Stall speed: 73 km/h (45 mph, 39 kn) flaps down
- Range: 1,277 km (793 mi, 690 nmi)
- Service ceiling: 4,265 m (13,993 ft)
- g limits: +4/-2
- Rate of climb: 5.85 m/s (1,152 ft/min) at sea level

Avionics

- Standard VFR, two screen EFIS.
