= EAS Barcelona =

EAS Barcelona, officially known as the European Aviation School of Barcelona, is a flight training academy based in Barcelona, Spain. It offers professional pilot training in compliance with European aviation regulations.

== History & operations ==
The school was established to provide structured aviation education and training programs for aspiring pilots and flight instructors. EAS Barcelona's administrative and theoretical instruction center is located at Rector Triadó in Barcelona, near Sants Station. Practical flight training is conducted at Sabadell Airport, where the school operates briefing rooms and training infrastructure.

The school's aircraft fleet includes Tecnam P2002JF single-engine aircraft and Tecnam P2006T multi-engine aircraft. It also operates flight simulators such as the FNPT II MCC Airbus A320 simulator.
