= P48 =

P48 or P.48 may refer to:

== Aircraft ==
- Douglas XP-48, a cancelled American fighter aircraft
- Partenavia P.48 Astore, an Italian prototype light aircraft
- Percival P.48 Merganser, a British civil utility aircraft

== Other uses ==
- BMW P48 Turbo engine, an automobile engine
- BRM P48, a Formula One racing car
- HMS P48 (1917), a P-class sloop of the Royal Navy
- HMS P48 (1942), a submarine of the Royal Navy
- Papyrus 48 or P48, an early copy of a part of the New Testament in Greek
- Pleasant Valley Airport, in Maricopa County, Arizona, United States
- PTF1A, pancreas transcription factor 1 subunit alpha
- P48, a Latvian state regional road
- P48, a phantom power standard
