= Tecnam P-Mentor =

Italian training airplane

P-Mentor
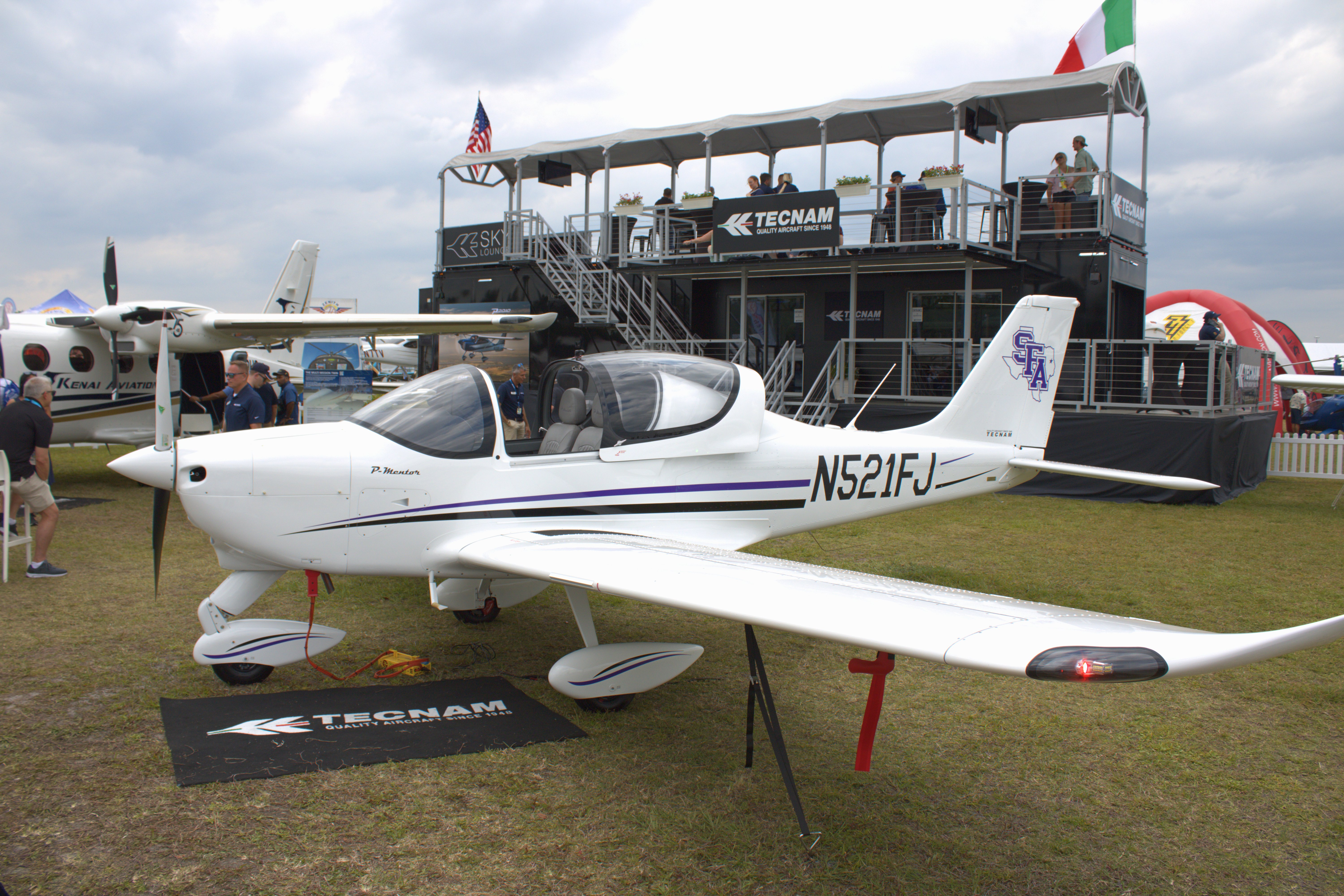

General information
- Type: Light aircraft
- National origin: Italy
- Manufacturer: Tecnam
- Status: In production (2022)

History
- Introduction date: April 2022

The Tecnam P-Mentor is an Italian two-seat, low-wing light aircraft, purpose-built for ab-initio through instrument flight training, designed and produced by Tecnam, in Capua, Italy. It was introduced in April 2022 and is EASA CS-23 type certified in Europe, later followed by FAA Part 23 and Transport Canada validations..

The design was first unveiled at AERO Friedrichshafen in April 2022. Conceived as a single-platform trainer from PPL and Upset Prevention and Recovery Training. The P-Mentor combines a Rotax 912iSc3 advanced Garmin glass cockpit, and an all-metal/composite airframe to deliver full IFR capability and is now operated by flight schools worldwide.

== Design and development ==
The P-Mentor was designed to comply with the European Union Aviation Safety Agency EASA CS-23 regulations for certified light aircraft. It was EASA CS-23 certified on 7 April 2022.

The design features a cantilever low-wing, two-seats-in-side-by-side configuration enclosed cockpit under a bubble canopy, fixed tricycle landing gear with wheel pants and a single engine in tractor configuration, driving a two-bladed variable pitch propeller.

The aircraft wing has a light alloy spar and wing box, with a carbon-fibre-reinforced polymer leading edge. The 9.0 m (29.5 ft) span wing is equipped with slotted flaps of 75% span, plus frise ailerons. The standard engine employed is the 75 kW (101 hp) Rotax 912iSc four-stroke certified powerplant.

The design uses a new tapered planform wing, employing a laminar flow airfoil, which meets the EASA CS-23 requirements for low speed handling and stall characteristics without a ballistic parachute, although a parachute is approved and available as a factory option.

The aircraft may be equipped for IFR flight. For training use it may be optionally equipped with a simulated retractable landing gear handle, although the landing gear does not actually retract.

== Specifications ==
Data from AVweb, Flying, Manufacturer

General characteristics

- Crew: one
- Capacity: one passenger
- Length: 6.74 m (22 ft 1 in)
- Wingspan: 9.00 m (29 ft 6 in)
- Height: 2.50 m (8 ft 2 in)
- Empty weight: 430 kg (948 lb)
- Gross weight: 720 kg (1,587 lb)
- Fuel capacity: 130 litres (29 imp gal; 34 US gal)
- Powerplant: 1 × Rotax 912iSc four cylinder, liquid and air-cooled, four stroke aircraft engine, 75 kW (100 hp)
- Propellers: 2-bladed variable pitch

Performance

- Cruise speed: 217 km/h (135 mph, 117 kn)
- Stall speed: 81 km/h (51 mph, 44 kn) flaps down
- Range: 1,350 km (840 mi, 730 nmi)
- Service ceiling: 4,000 m (13,000 ft)

Avionics

- Garmin G3X flight display
- Garmin GI275 backup instrument
- Garmin GFC 500 autopilot
