= Tecnam P2010 =

Italian light aircraft

P2010
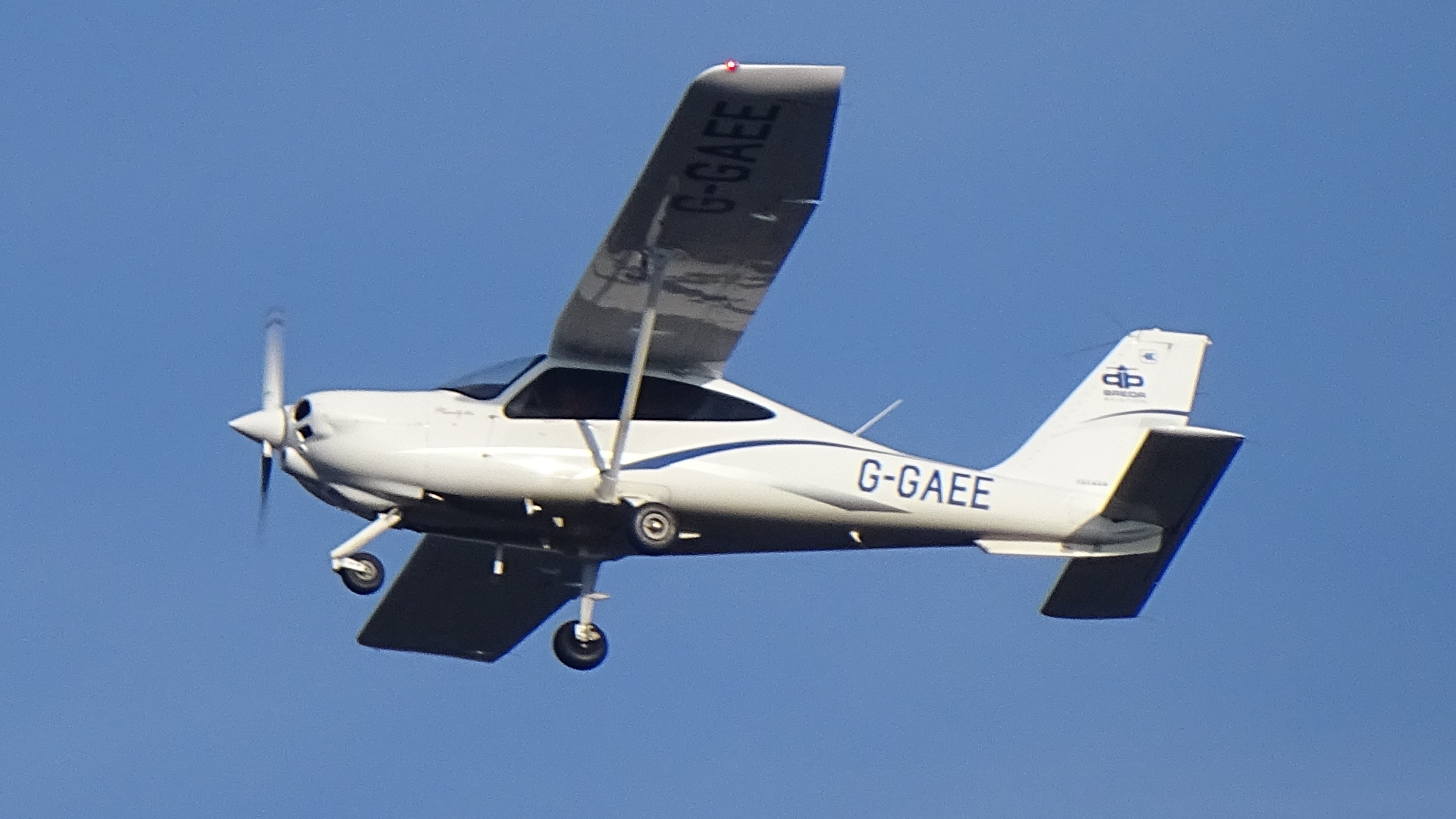
- P2010 in flight

General information
- Type: Four seat light aircraft
- National origin: Italy
- Manufacturer: Costruzioni Aeronautiche Tecnam S.p.A.
- Number built: 245 (January 2024)

History
- Manufactured: 2014–present
- First flight: 12 April 2012
- Developed from: Tecnam P2008

The Tecnam 2010 is a four-seat, high wing, single engine light aircraft of mixed metal and carbon-fiber-reinforced polymer construction. Built and designed by Costruzioni Aeronautiche Tecnam, based in Capua, Italy, near Naples. The P2010 was first unveiled at the AERO Friedrichshafen show in April 2011 and made its maiden flight in 2012. It received type certification from the European Union Aviation Safety Agency (EASA) under CS-23 in September 2014, and FAA validation under FAR Part 23 followed in 2015.

Developed from the two-seat Tecnam P2008, the P2010 introduced a larger carbon-fiber fuselage, all-metal wings, and Tecnam's signature all-moving stabilator. It was designed to offer modern ergonomics, a three-door cabin, and versatile engine options, including avgas and Jet-A capability.

== Development ==
The Tecnam P2010 (sometimes called P Twenty-Ten) was conceived to fill a market gap for a modern four-seat, single-engine aircraft in Tecnam’s lineup, bridging the step up from the two-seat P2008 light sport. Designed by Professor Luigi Pascale, Tecnam’s co-founder and chief designer, the P2010 combined a carbon-fibre fuselage with metal wings and tail, blending modern materials with proven aerodynamics. The design drew on lessons from earlier Tecnams: it adopted a full-flying stabilator tail (for pitch control and stability) derived from the P2006T twin and P2008 designs. P2010 was designed to offer a third rear door for back passengers.

The P2010 was first seen in public at AERO Friedrichshafen 2011, where Tecnam displayed a prototype and announced the new model and the maiden flight occur on 12 April 2012. The aircraft generated strong interest, Tecnam reportedly sold 30 delivery positions during the 2011 AERO event alone. By the time of its debut at AERO 2012, Tecnam had accumulated 50 orders for the P2010.

The company initially planned to have US FAR Part 23 certification completed by November 2012 and stated it would refund deposits if the aircraft was not certified by the end of 2014. European European Aviation Safety Agency certification was completed in September 2014, with American Federal Aviation Administration certification completed in December 2015. By the time of FAA certification, Tecnam had delivered about 40 P2010s to European customers, and several U.S.-bound aircraft were awaiting shipment pending the American certificate.

In 2017 the company announced the P2010 "MkII", optioning a larger 215 hp Lycoming IO-390 engine in place of the original 180 hp powerplant, plus a new MT variable-pitch propeller and Garmin G1000 NXi avionics suite. The 210 HP configuration upgrade boosted the P2010’s top cruise speed to 146 knots, improving on the original variant’s performance.

On 27 May 2020, Tecnam introduced a diesel-powered upgrade, the P2010 TDI, with a liquid-cooled 170-hp (127 kW) turbocharged Continental CD-170 engine capable of using either diesel or jet fuel. Its 5.2 gph consumption, increase the range compared to previous model, (1050 nm vs. 660 nm for petrol-powered version). The diesel’s single-lever power control and digital engine monitoring were integrated into the G1000 NXi cockpit, and the airframe received minor tweaks like 26G-rated crashworthy seats and other refinements for the new variant. The P2010 TDI was EASA certified on 20 October 2020 and US Federal Aviation Administration certified in November 2021, with the liquid-cooled, four-cylinder Continental CD-170. The diesel engine's range advantage was balanced by three disadvantages: the engine must be replaced after 1,200 hrs; the unit price increased to around US$412,000 (from US$345,000 for the gasoline version); and cruise speed is lower (136kt, vs. 146kt for the 215 hp gasoline version).

A hybrid aircraft demonstrator version of the P2010 was first flown on 21 December 2021. Powered by a 104 kW (139 hp) Rotax 915iS piston engine coupled to a 30 kW (40 hp) Rolls-Royce electric motor, the aircraft is not intended for sale, but for developmental purposes.

Tecnam introduced the Gran Lusso (Great Luxury) version in July 2022 a premium variant with increasing the interior and exterior quality. Equipped with the turbocharged Continental CD-170, this variant was developed to improve crew comfort and ergonomic, designed by the company's Centro Stile (Style Centre) design team. Tecnam outfitted the Gran Lusso with redesigned leather interior, including chocolate-brown upholstery on the seats and panels. The panel layout was redesigned and complemented by Garmin’s G1000 NXi avionics and a GMC 707 autopilot controller with an FMS keypad, giving the cockpit a more upscale automotive feel. Other Gran Lusso details include a brushed aluminum throttle and control wheel, improved cabin storage and USB power ports, LED lighting, and exclusive metallic exterior paint options.

== Design ==
The aircraft is available in multiple power plant configurations. The base model is powered by a Lycoming IO-360-M1A, a 180 hp (135 kW), fuel-injected, air-cooled, horizontally opposed four-cylinder engine, capable of operating on both 100LL Avgas and approved automotive fuels. A more powerful 215 hp Lycoming IO-390-C3B6 variant is offered in the MkII version, delivering increased climb performance and cruise speed. Additionally, the P2010 TDI variant is equipped with a 170 hp Continental CD-170 Jet-A diesel engine, featuring FADEC (Full Authority Digital Engine Control), single-lever operation, and turbocharging for improved high-altitude performance. All variants are fitted with constant-speed MT-Propeller systems, with two- or three-blade configurations depending on engine type.

The P2010’s maximum cruising speed ranges from 136 to 148 knots depending on engine configuration. The aircraft offers a range of up to 1,050 nautical miles (1,945 km) in the diesel-powered TDI version, with a useful load of approximately 882 lb (400 kg). The service ceiling is up to 18,000 feet (5,486 m), for the turbocharged diesel variant. Takeoff distance is between 1,549 ft (472 m) and 2,211 ft (674 m), while landing distance is between 1,709 ft (521 m) and 2,211 ft (674 m).

The cockpit features a Garmin G1000 NXi avionics suite as standard on MkII, TDI, and Gran Lusso models. The integrated flight deck includes synthetic vision, terrain awareness, GFC 700 digital autopilot, ADS-B IN/OUT, and optional Flight Stream connectivity. Earlier 180 hp models were offered with either traditional round-dial IFR panels or early-generation Garmin systems such as the G500.

Internally, the P2010 offers a spacious cabin. The three-door configuration (two front pilot/passenger doors and a separate right-side rear door) simplifies ingress and egress for all occupants. Seating is arranged in two rows, accommodating four adults in leather-trimmed seats with adjustable ventilation outlets, reading lights, and cabin storage. The Gran Lusso variant includes upgraded materials, ambient lighting, and a console-mounted single-lever power control.

The fixed tricycle landing gear uses spring cantilever main legs and a castering nosewheel, with all wheels covered by streamlined fairings to reduce drag.

Primary flight controls use pushrod mechanisms for ailerons and elevators. Flaps are electrically actuated and span the inboard sections of the semi-tapered wing.

== Variants ==
Over time, Tecnam introduced several variants of the P2010, including:

- P2010 180 HP, equipped with a Lycoming IO-360-M1A engine,
- P2010 MkII, fitted with a 180HP Lycoming IO-360-M1A or 215 HP Lycoming IO-390 C1B3 engine and Garmin G1000Nxi avionics,
- P2010 TDI, powered by a 170 HP Continental CD-170 Jet-A diesel engine with FADEC,
- P2010 Gran Lusso, a luxury diesel-powered version with enhanced interior and single-lever power control

== Market ==
Early Deliveries and Initial Market Entry

Tecnam’s P2010 (“Twenty-Ten”) sold 30 delivery positions at its public debut during Aero 2011. Initial production deliveries began in Europe; by the end of 2015 Tecnam had delivered about 40 P2010s to European customers. With FAA Part 23 approval secured, Tecnam began shipping U.S.-bound aircraft in 2016; five airframes were immediately released from the Italian factory for American buyers, and two more were built for the initial U.S. orders, all seven early U.S. having paid cash up front. To support the new fleet, Tecnam expanded its service network in the United States, establishing maintenance centers in Florida, Indiana, North Carolina, Texas, California and New York by 2016.

North America

in 2025 U.S. Aviation Academy one of the country’s largest flight schools, agreed to acquire up to 90 Tecnam trainers to renew its fleet. This multi-year order includes a mix of single-engine P2010s and twin-engine P2006T MkII light twins, with 38 firm deliveries through early 2026 and options for 52 more by 2027.

Europe

Air Paris Academy (APA Training), based at Tours, launched operations in 2018 with an order for four P2010 MkII aircraft (215 hp Lycoming IO-390 engines) plus options for additional units. The school received its first two P2010s in mid-2019, ferrying them from Tecnam’s Italian plant to Tours Val de Loire Airport to begin student training. Legends Aviation Academy (Italy) operates Tecnam P2010's as our primary instrument and commercial pilot course aircraft, Superior air (Greece) use the P2010 as single engine trainer and in 2023 Green Flight Academy (Sweden) ordered two P2010 Tdi, with the option for an additional three more in 2024.

Asia-Pacific

In 2018 Tecnam and its local aerospace partner Liaoning United-Air ShenYan Co. Ltd (LUSY) announced t an order for a fleet of 30 aeroplanes from the Anhui Lantian International Flight Academy (ALIFA) China. Chairman, ALIFA said: “Our company have selected TECNAM P2006T Twins and P2010 P twenty Ten’s models to replace our legacy fleet of training aeroplanes. In 2025, Orient Flights Aviation Academy in India inducted the P2010 TDI to train its students, highlighting the model’s fuel efficiency and the advantage of using widely-available Jet A-1 fuel.

Latin America

In Mexico, low-cost carrier Viva Aerobus partnered with Tecnam in 2025 to equip the new Viva Aerobus Pilot Academy with a fleet of P2010s. The airline’s training arm ordered six P2010 TDI single-engine models and one P2006T twin as an initial batch, with deliveries beginning in the first quarter of 2025. This fleet (with potential options for additional aircraft) will be used for training cadets from the private pilot license (PPL) level through advanced commercial and multi-engine ratings.

Middle East and Africa

The first Tecnam P2010 delivered to the Middle East was indeed registered A7‑TBA, and it arrived in 2015 at Aviation Home’s base at Al Khor Airport in Qatar. This P2010 was ferried directly from Tecnam’s Capua, Italy factory through a 25‑hour flight with stops in Brindisi, Corfu, Crete, Alexandria, Cairo, Hurghada, Medina, Riyadh, and then Doha. Aviation Home, Tecnam’s distributor for Qatar, the UAE, and Saudi Arabia, added the P2010 alongside other models like the P2006T Twin, leveraging the type to offer modern training and touring flights in the region.

== Specifications - P2010 TDI ==
Data from Jane's All the World's Aircraft 2011/12., Sport Aviation June 2012, manufacturer.

General characteristics

- Capacity: 4 (pilot and three passengers)
- Length: 7.97 m (26 ft 2 in)
- Wingspan: 10.30 m (33 ft 10 in)
- Height: 2.64 m (8 ft 8 in)
- Wing area: 13.90 m^{2} (149.6 sq ft)
- Airfoil: NACA 63A
- Empty weight: 818 kg (1,803 lb)
- Max takeoff weight: 1,220 kg (2,690 lb)
- Fuel capacity: 240 L (52.8 Imp gal, 63.4 US gal) in two wing tanks
- Powerplant: 1 × Continental CD-170 liquid-cooled 4-cylinder in-line, 130 kW (170 hp) four-stroke diesel engine with double overhead camshaft (DOHC) and FADEC control.
- Propellers: 3-bladed MT Propeller constant speed, 1.880 m (6 ft 2 in) diameter constant speed, clockwise rotation

Performance

- Maximum speed: 260 km/h (160 mph, 140 kn)
- Cruise speed: 237 km/h (147 mph, 128 kn) normal, at 65% power at 2,300 m (7,500 ft)
- Stall speed: 96 km/h (60 mph, 52 kn) flaps down
- Range: 1,780 km (1,110 mi, 960 nmi)
- Service ceiling: 5,500 m (18,000 ft)
- Rate of climb: 7.2 m/s (1,420 ft/min) maximum at sea level
- Fuel consumption: 26.5 litres per hour at 75% power

Avionics

- Garmin G1000 NXi with GFC 700

== See also ==
Aircraft of comparable role, configuration, and era

- Cessna 172S
- Cessna 182T Skylane
- Cirrus SR20
- Diamond DA40
- Lancair Columbia
- Mooney M20
- Sling Aircraft Sling TSi
- Vans RV-10
