= Tecnam P2006T =

Twin-engine general aviation aircraft

P2006T
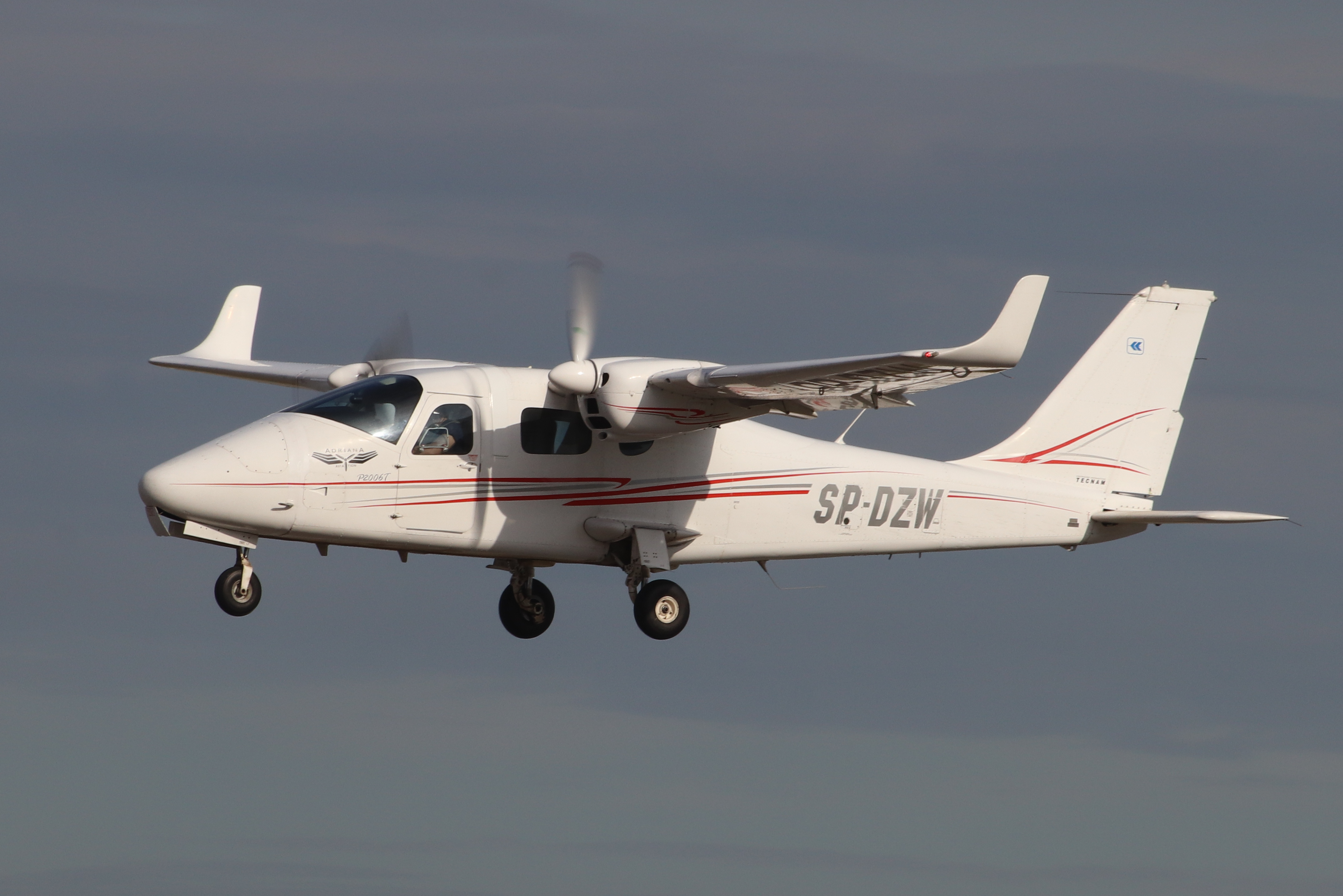
- A Tecnam 2006T

General information
- Role: Light twin-engine utility aircraft / multi-engine trainer
- National origin: Italy
- Manufacturer: Tecnam
- Designer: Luigi Pascale
- Number built: Over 400 (as of 2025)

History
- Manufactured: 2007–present
- Introduction date: June 2009
- First flight: 13 September 2007
- Developed into: NASA X-57 Maxwell

The Tecnam P2006T is an Italian shoulder-winged twin-engined all-metal light aircraft, built by Costruzioni Aeronautiche Tecnam based in Capua, Italy, near Naples. The P2006T received airworthiness certification in the European Union by EASA under CS23 in 2003, type certification in 2009, and Federal Aviation Administration FAR Part 23 certification in 2010.

In February 2025, Tecnam introduced the P2006T NG (Next generation) and the P2006T NG Sport. Compared to its predecessor, the P2006T MkII, the NG version offers an increased MTOW, more fuel-efficient Rotax 912iSc3 engines, a redesigned cockpit with advanced Garmin G1000Nxi avionics, and improved access with four independent doors.

Currently, the P2006T is the lightest twin-engined certified aircraft available. It is a four-seat aircraft with fully retractable landing gear and powered by two liquid-cooled Rotax 912iSc3 fuel-injected engines that can run on 92 octane unleaded automotive gasoline as well as Avgas 100LL.

== Development ==
The P2006T is a shoulder-wing light twin-engine aircraft developed by Tecnam in the mid-2000s. The aircraft was conceived by Professor Luigi Pascale, co-founder and chief designer at Tecnam, as a response to the increasing demand for a cost-effective and fuel-efficient multi-engine trainer. The project aimed to fill a market niche between legacy piston twins, often expensive to operate, and modern glass-cockpit trainers with lower acquisition costs. Initially referred to as P2006 VELT (Very Light Twin), the aircraft was designed around the lightweight and fuel-efficient Rotax 912S3 engines.

The first prototype completed its maiden flight in September 2007 from Capua Airport in Italy. Following its flight test campaign, the aircraft received EASA CS-23 IFR certification in June 2009, allowing it to be operated under IFR). The P2006T was subsequently introduced to international markets, and in 2010, it obtained certification from the Federal Aviation Administration in the United States, marking its entry into the North American training fleets.

The aircraft was notable at launch for being the lightest certified twin-engine aircraft on the market, constructed entirely of metal and featuring retractable landing gear. Its twin 100 hp Rotax 912S3 engines, capable of operating on both AVGAS and automotive-grade MOGAS, enabled significantly reduced operating costs compared to legacy aircraft in the same category. The design also featured modular maintenance access and short-field performance, making it suitable for various operating environments.

Building on its commercial success, Tecnam expanded the P2006T platform in subsequent years. In 2015, the P2006T SMP (Special Mission Platform) was developed, incorporating structural provisions and electrical systems for integrating mission equipment such as EO/IR sensors, making it suitable for border patrol, surveillance, and aerial mapping. This marked the beginning of the aircraft's evolution into roles beyond pilot training.

In 2016, the aircraft gained further attention when NASA selected a heavily modified P2006T airframe for its X-57 Maxwell program, an experimental initiative exploring electric propulsion technologies using distributed electric motors along the wing. That same year, the Italian Air Force introduced the type into service as the T-2006A, acquiring three modified aircraft to be used as part of its multi-engine pilot training syllabus at the 70th Wing based in Latina.

In 2017, Tecnam introduced the P2006T MkII, a featuring the Garmin G1000 NXi avionics suite, updated cockpit ergonomics, and a new interior design. The core airframe and propulsion system remained unchanged, but the avionics upgrade brought the aircraft in line with modern training fleet requirements, enabling better integration with procedural training standards used by major airlines.

In April 2024, Tecnam unveiled the P2006T NG (Next Generation) at the AERO Friedrichshafen airshow. This updated version was the result of a multiyear development process based on feedback from operators worldwide. The NG incorporated over 300 design improvements, ranging from structural and ergonomic upgrades to avionics, lighting, and powerplant enhancements. In addition to the standard NG model, Tecnam introduced the P2006T NG Sport, a premium variant featuring a handcrafted black leather interior, Alcantara headliners, plush moquette seats, leather side walls, and carbon-look panels.

The P2006T NG was officially certified by EASA in February 2025. Notable changes included the introduction of the Rotax 912 iSc3 electronically fuel-injected engines for better high altitude performance, redesigned fuselage with four independent access doors and larger windows, upgraded LED lighting integrated into redesigned wingtips, improved maintenance accessibility, and an expanded avionics interface featuring the Garmin GCU 477 keyboard. The NG variant marked the most comprehensive redesign of the P2006T family. A Sport package also debuted, featuring upgrades to interior materials such as premium leather seat and sidewall covers.

As of early 2025, Tecnam has built and delivered more than 400 units of the P2006T in various configurations.

== Design ==
The Tecnam P2006T NG is a twin-engine light aircraft, powered by two Rotax 912iSc3 piston engines, each producing 75 kilowatts (100 hp). These fuel-injected, liquid- and air-cooled engines offer high efficiency, using approximately 14 litres per hour (3.7 US gal/h) per hour per engine, and enable the aircraft to cruise at a maximum speed of 148 kn (274 km/h; 170 mph) (274 km/h). The engines drive two-blade, constant-speed, full-feathering MT propellers, and are equipped with automatic mixture control, removing the need for mixture adjustment in the cockpit. Engine starting both on the ground and in-flight, is electric with a dual-battery system installed to ensure redundancy during engine restart.

The P2006T NG has a maximum range of 930 nmi (1,720 km; 1,070 mi) with a service ceiling of 4,300 m (14,000 ft). Takeoff distance is 417 m (1,368 ft), and landing distance is 370 m (1,230 ft). It offers a useful load of 410 kg (900 lb). The aircraft is certified under EASA CS-23 Amendment 4 and is compliant with IFR training requirements.

It competes with aircraft such as the Piper Seminole and Diamond DA42. Its shoulder-wing configuration improves visibility, especially useful for training purposes, while the retractable landing gear and variable pitch propellers provide pilots with realistic complex aircraft handling.

The aircraft is built to support a variety of training missions. It features dual flight controls, a redesigned central pedestal for improved ergonomics, and a Garmin G1000 NXi integrated avionics suite. The standard configuration includes GFC 700 autopilot, synthetic vision, terrain awareness, and ADS-B IN/OUT. The NG Sport variant adds Flight Stream 510, enhanced interior finishes, and a customized luxury cabin experience.

The cabin seats four in a side-by-side configuration with two front doors and a separate passenger door, allowing for easier cockpit entry and student changeover. The upgraded cabin features enlarged side windows, adjustable ventilation, simulated leather seating, and climate control options including cabin heating and windshield defrost. The external baggage compartment has been widened, offering convenient access for luggage and equipment, with a capacity of 80 kg (180 lb)

The primary structure is constructed from light aluminium alloy, using riveted and bolted assemblies for the fuselage, wings, and empennage. The cantilever wing incorporates two spars with sheet metal ribs and glass-fibre reinforced plastic (GFRP) leading edges. The wing design features a semi-tapered planform and utilizes a high-lift airfoil profile to achieve low stall speeds and effective training performance. Electrically actuated flaps enhance short-field capability.

Control surfaces are linked via pushrod mechanisms, rather than traditional cable-and-pulley systems, providing more precise handling and reduced maintenance. The electro-hydraulic landing gear consists of a steerable nosewheel and trailing-link main gear, designed to absorb landing impact.

== Market ==
The Tecnam P2006T first flew in September 2007 and achieved EASA CS-23 certification on 5 June 2009. Initial deliveries began the same year, positioning the aircraft as a cost-effective solution in the light twin-engine segment. With its modern Rotax engines and low operating costs, it quickly gained popularity as a practical platform for multi-engine flight training FAA certification followed in 2010, allowing Tecnam to formally enter the U.S. market. One of the first deliveries in the U.S. went to Ocean Air in Watsonville, California, where the P2006T was used to provide economical multi-engine instruction.

Simultaneously, Tecnam expanded into the Asia-Pacific region. A P2006T was delivered to New Zealand for certification and demonstrations, soon resulting in orders from New Zealand (Izard Pacific Aviation of Taupo) and Australia.

In 2012, Tecnam partnered with Spanish defense contractor Indra, alongside SELEX Galileo and FLIR Systems, to develop a surveillance-focused variant. The P2006T MRI (Multisensor Reconnaissance & Identification) was outfitted with search radar, EO/IR sensors, and datalink capabilities, enabling it to support maritime patrol, search-and-rescue, and border control missions. The first production MRI was delivered in 2014 to CSS Tactical in South Africa, following a ferry flight from Europe.

Further adoption followed: in 2016, the Dominican Republic Air Force acquired a P2006T configured for surveillance operations, using its onboard sensor suite for border and maritime patrols. That same year, the Italian Air Force selected the aircraft for its pilot training curriculum. Three units were delivered to the 70° Stormo flight school, where they served in advanced multi-engine training, replacing older platforms with a more economical and modern solution.

The aircraft's adaptability attracted the attention of NASA, which in 2016 selected the P2006T as the base airframe for its X-57 Maxwell program, an all-electric experimental aircraft intended to demonstrate distributed electric propulsion. While the X-57 faced technical challenges and did not reach flight testing before its cancellation in 2023, the program underlined the P2006T's structural integrity and modularity for advanced aerospace research.

In response to growing operator needs, Tecnam introduced the P2006T MkII in 2017. This updated version featured the Garmin G1000 NXi avionics suite, revised interior and lighting, and other ergonomic improvements.

In 2020 in India, a new regional operator launched commuter services under the "Air Taxi" brand, using the P2006T for short-haul sectors of less than 300 kilometers. In 2023, the New Zealand Airline Academy took delivery of a P2006T as part of a 10-aircraft Tecnam fleet order to train cadet pilots for Air India. The ferry flight from Tecnam's facility in Capua, Italy, to Oamaru, New Zealand.

At the 2024 AERO Friedrichshafen show, Tecnam unveiled the P2006T NG (Next Generation), a major upgrade to the platform. The NG introduced fuel-injected Rotax 912iSc3 engines for improved high-altitude performance and fuel flexibility, along with a higher maximum takeoff weight and refined aerodynamics. New features included a co-pilot-side cabin door, enlarged windows, and the latest Garmin G1000 NXi avionics suite. The first customer, Spain's FlyBy Aviation Academy, committed to the NG as part of its expanding fleet. By then, Tecnam had reported over 400 P2006Ts delivered globally. In mid-2024, the UK's Royal Air Force acquired a P2006T in a special ISR configuration to serve as a testbed for sensor integration and flight system trials, managed by the Rapid Capabilities Office.

In early 2025 the US Aviation Academy, a major flight school based in Texas, ordered up to 90 Tecnam aircraft, including a mix of P2010 single-engine trainers and P2006T MkII twins. Around the same time, Viva Aerobus, Mexico's low-cost airline, selected the P2006T NG for its new cadet pilot academy, ordering one twin alongside several P2010 TDIs, with options for expansion.

== Variants ==
P2006T MKII
Standard civilian version.
P2006 NG
Improved version of the P2006 MkII, featuring two additional doors for enhanced cabin access, a new external baggage compartment and upgraded modern avionics.
P2006 NG Sport
Premium version in term of interiors and finishes of the P2006 NG.
P2006T SMP
Mission-ready variant of the P2006T twin-engine aircraft, purpose-built for special operations such as surveillance, mapping, maritime patrol, search and rescue, and environmental monitoring
P2006T MRI
Maritime patrol variant.
P2006T MMA
Multi-Mission variant modified with mission equipment by Airborne Technologies.
T-2006A
Italian military designation for aircraft delivered in the Training role to 70° Stormo of the Italian Air Force on 5 July 2016 for multi-engine pilot training.

== Operators ==
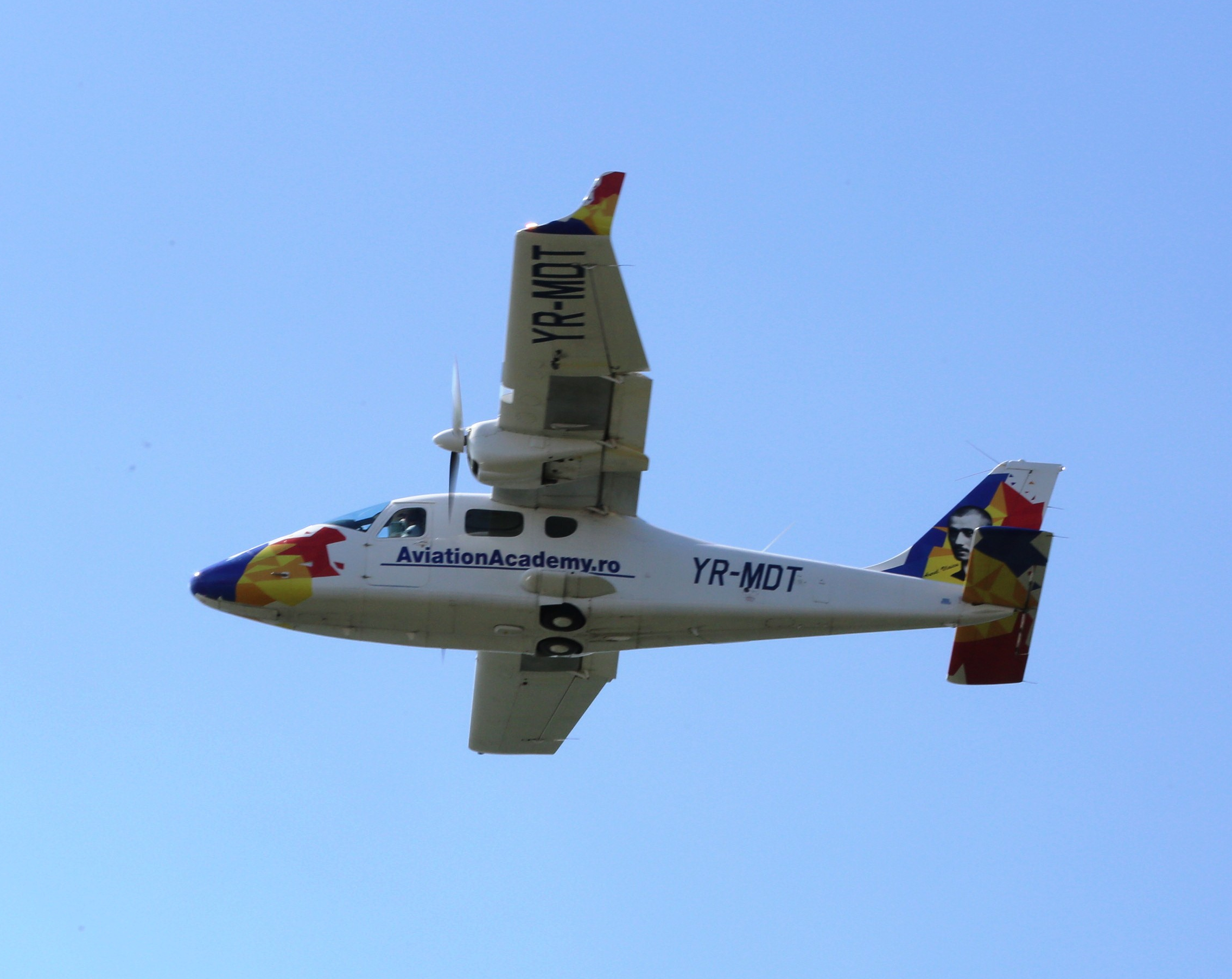
Tecnam P2006T of the Romanian Aviation Academy

Canada

- Harv's Air Service

Dominican Republic

- Dominican Air Force

Spain

- Guardia Civil

India

- Air Taxi

Romania

- Romanian Aviation Academy

Italy

- Italian Air Force - 3 aircraft on lease

United Kingdom

- Royal Air Force

United States

- Michigan Department of Natural Resources

== Specifications ==
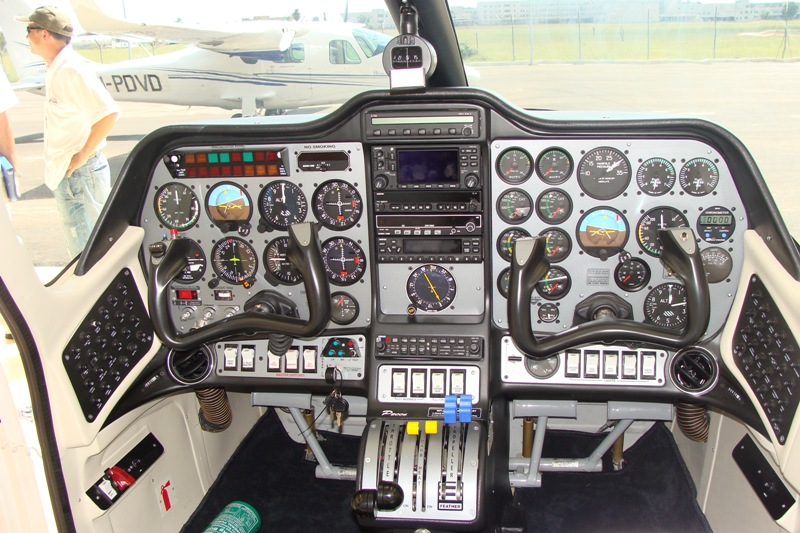
P2006T analog cockpit

Data from

General characteristics

- Crew: 1
- Capacity: 3 passengers
- Length: 8.7 m (28 ft 7 in)
- Wingspan: 11.4 m (37 ft 5 in)
- Height: 2.90 m (9 ft 6 in)
- Wing area: 14.8 m^{2} (159 sq ft)
- Aspect ratio: 8.80
- Empty weight: 880 kg (1,940 lb)
- Max takeoff weight: 1,290 kg (2,844 lb)
- Fuel capacity: 200 litres (44 imp gal; 53 US gal)
- Powerplant: 2 × Rotax 912isc3 Sport horizontally opposed four-cylinder geared piston engines, 75 kW (100 hp) each
- Propellers: 2-bladed MT Propeller MTV-21, 1.78 m (5 ft 10 in) diameter constant-speed, fully feathering

Performance

- Cruise speed: 274 km/h (170 mph, 148 kn)
- Stall speed: 104 km/h (64 mph, 56 kn)
- Range: 1,722 km (1,070 mi, 930 nmi)
- Service ceiling: 4,300 m (14,000 ft)
- Rate of climb: 4.7 m/s (930 ft/min)

== Accidents and incidents ==
- 19 May 2024: A training plane Tecnam P2006T with registration PK-IFP had an air accident in the Sunburst Field area, Bumi Serpong Damai (BSD), Serpong District, South Tangerang, Indonesia, killing the three people on board. The cause of the trainer plane crash in BSD is still being investigated, suspected to be due to the weather.
- 16 August 2026: A training plane Tecnam P2006T with registration EC-LIF crash-landed in a crop field near Viana, Navarra, north of Spain. The two people on board (a flight instructor and a pilot student) were injured.

== See also ==
- Diamond DA42
- Partenavia P.68
- Piper Seminole
