= Luigi Pascale =

Italian engineer and aircraft designer

- Born: 1923; Naples, Italy
- Died: 14 March 2017 (aged 93)
- Occupation: Aircraft designer

Luigi Pascale (1923 – 14 March 2017) was an Italian engineer designer of light aircraft. He was the founder of the aircraft manufacturers Partenavia and Tecnam, the latter a company he started with his brother Giovanni.

== Biography ==
Luigi "Gino" Pascale was born in Naples, Italy in 1923. He teamed with his brother Giovanni to design and construct several light aircraft. The first completed design was the Partenavia Astore in 1948.

In 1951 Pascale received a master's degree in mechanical engineering, after which he became an instructor at Naples University. He was elevated to rank of professor by 1957, when he founded the Italian aircraft design/manufacturing firm Partenavia.

In 1986 the two Pascale brothers founded the Italian aircraft design/manufacturing firm Tecnam.

Pascale died on 14 March 2017 in his house in Naples, aged 93.

== Designs ==
- Partenavia P.68
- Partenavia Oscar
- Partenavia Astore
- Tecnam P2006T
- Tecnam P92
- Tecnam P2012 Traveller

== Sources ==
- "Professor Luigi Pascale Italy's foremost aircraft designer awarded Honorary Doctorate | Tecnam". tecnam.com.
- Luigi Pascale Langer. "Luigi Pascale Langer: Executive Profile & Biography". Bloomberg.
- "Pascale, il progettista che ilmondo ci invidia" (PDF). Dsalenia.it.
