= Tecnam P92 =

Italian ultralight aircraft

P92 Echo
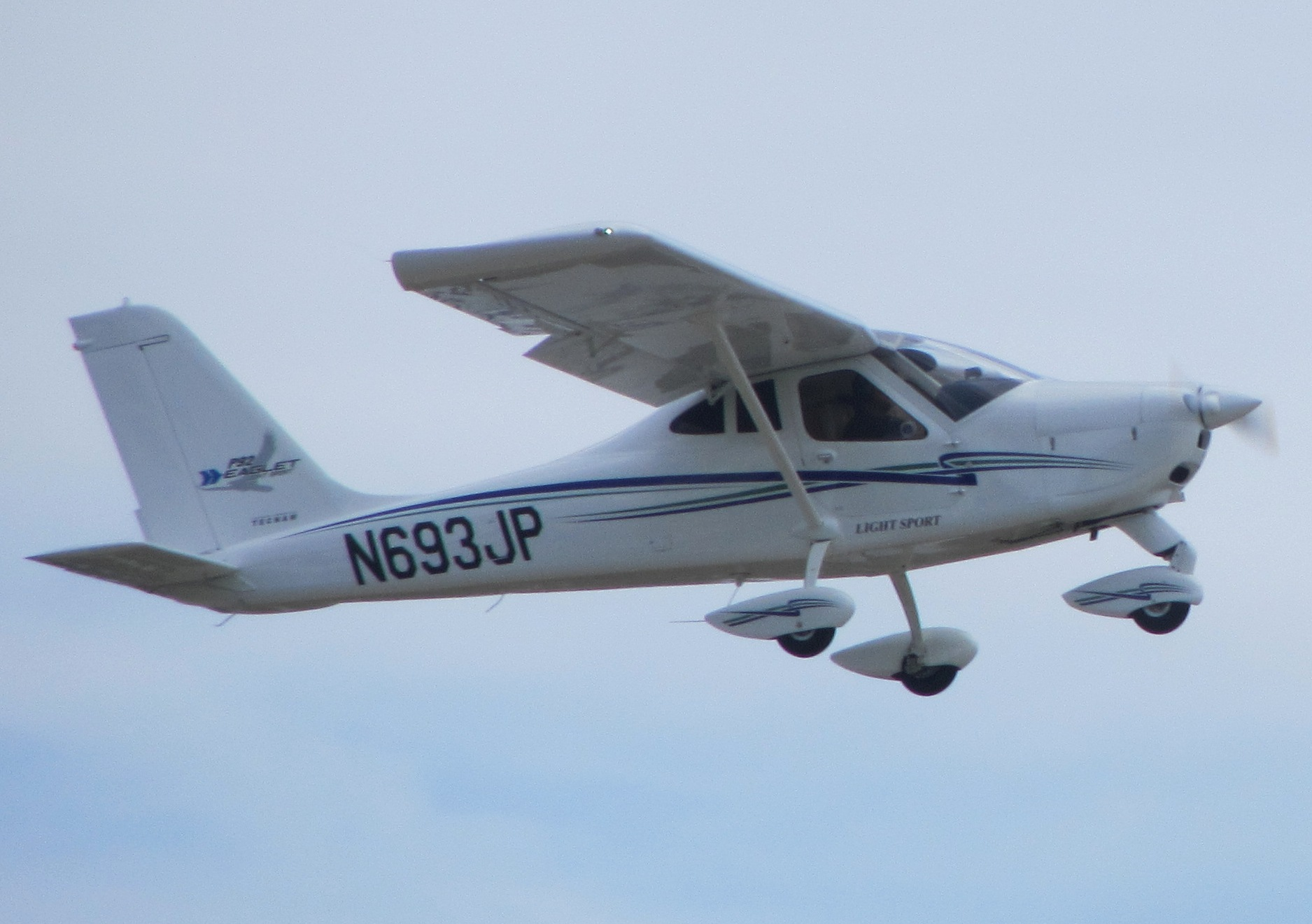

General information
- Type: Two-seat ultralight monoplane
- National origin: Italy
- Manufacturer: Tecnam
- Designer: Luigi Pascale
- Status: In production

History
- First flight: 14 March 1993

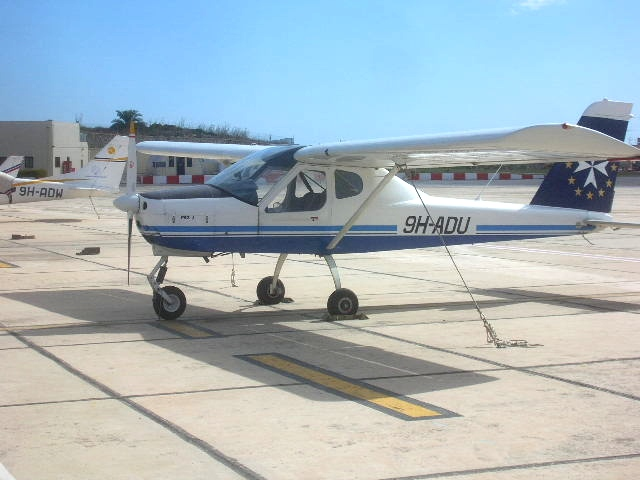
P-92 J

The Tecnam P92 is a family of two-seat, high-wing, light aircraft designed by Luigi Pascale and manufactured by Tecnam in Capua, Italy.

First introduced in 1993, the aircraft was developed for the ultralight category and has since evolved into one of Tecnam's most produced models, with over 2,500 units in service as 2018.

It has been widely used for recreational flying and primary flight training in Europe, North America, and other regions. Since its introduction in 1993, the P92 has been developed in multiple variants, including the Echo, Echo Super, JS, Eaglet, and others. The current production version is called P92 Echo MkII, and it was introduced in 2016.

Today, the P92 Echo MkII, features a strut-braced high wing, fixed tricycle landing gear, and side-by-side seating. Its airframe is primarily metal, with a composite (carbon‑fibre) fuselage, while earlier versions had all‑metal construction. It is powered by Rotax 912ULS series engines with 100 hp. The P92 Echo MkII has a published stall speed of approximately 39 knots (72 km/h) with full flaps, and a take-off distance of 1211ft (369 metres).

== Development ==
The P92 was the first aircraft designed and manufactured entirely by Tecnam. Before of the 1990s Tecnam was producing parts for other companies such as Aeritalia and McDonnell Douglas. Encouraged by the introduction of Italian Law 106/1985, which legalized recreational flight with ultralight aircraft and opened new market opportunities, Tecnam revisited an earlier design by Luigi Pascale to develop what would become the Tecnam P92, a two-seat, high-wing, all-metal ultralight aircraft designed for both private use and flight training.

The P92 prototype conducted its maiden flight on 14 March 1993 in Capua and shortly after debuted at the Bassano del Grappa Air Show. The P92 progressively entered service with a wide range of flying clubs and pilot training institutions. Throughout its development, Tecnam released multiple versions, such as the P92-J, P92 Echo Super, P92 Eaglet, and P92 MkII, each incorporating gradual upgrades in avionics, aerodynamics, construction materials (including the introduction of composite fuselages), and cockpit ergonomics. As reported by aviation journalist Dan Johnson, by 2018 more than 2,500 units had been delivered globally, making the P92 Tecnam’s most produced aircraft to date.

== Design ==
The P92 Echo MkII, introduced in 2016, is the most recent evolution of the P92 and it's the only version manufactured today. While maintaining the traditional strut-braced high-wing configuration, side-by-side seating, and fixed tricycle landing gear, the MkII introduced structural and ergonomic updates compared to previous variants.

The fuselage of the P92 Echo MkII is constructed using carbon-fiber composite materials, reducing weight and increasing structural efficiency, while the wings and tail surfaces remain in aluminium alloy. This hybrid construction allows the aircraft to retain robustness for training operations while benefiting from the weight savings and shaping flexibility of composites. The landing gear is non-retractable and reinforced to endure repeated take-offs and landings in a flight school environment.

The cabin features revised ergonomics aiming to improve visibility, soundproofing, and comfort, and is designed to accommodate both analog and glass cockpit avionics configurations, including optional systems such as the Garmin G3X Touch. Access to the cockpit is provided via large side doors, and the seating layout accommodates two occupants in a side-by-side arrangement.

The aircraft is powered by a 100 hp Rotax 912ULS four-stroke engine in tractor configuration, and is equipped with a fixed-pitch propeller. According to published specifications, the Echo MkII has a stall speed of approximately 39 knots (72 km/h) with full flaps and a take-off distance of 1,211 ft (369 m) under standard atmospheric conditions.

The P92 Echo MkII is available in different configurations to comply with both European ultralight regulations (MTOW 472.5 kg) and US light-sport aircraft (LSA) standards (MTOW up to 600 kg). It is included in the list of FAA-accepted Special Light-Sport Aircraft (S-LSA) and is certified under various national civil aviation authorities.

== Variants ==
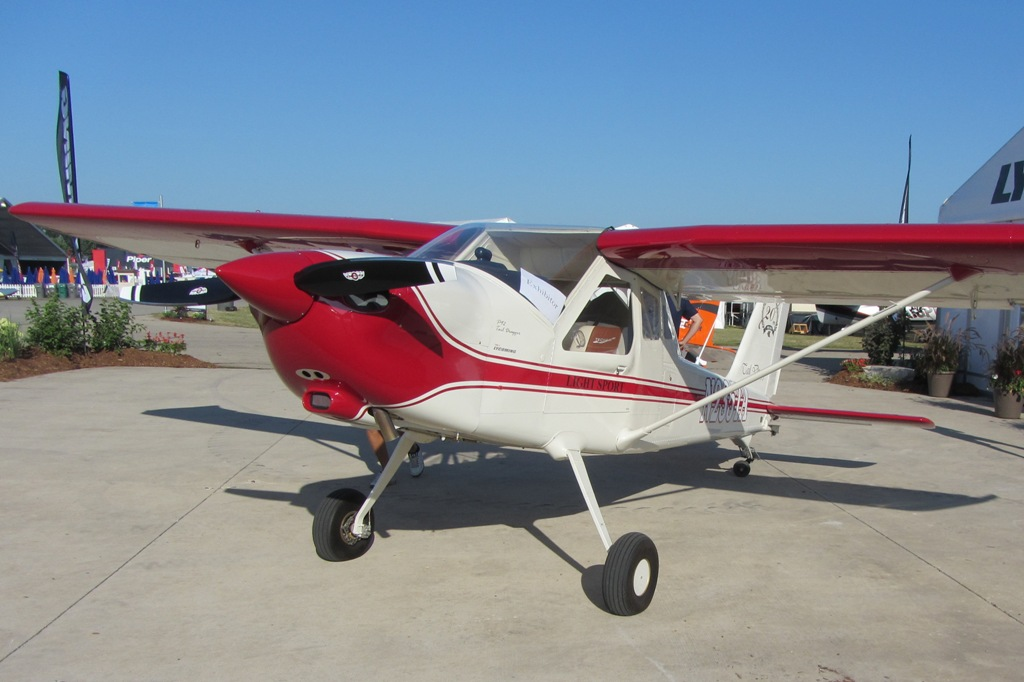
Tecnam P92 Taildragger

P92-JS
An upgraded version of the P92-J with 100 hp (75 kW) Rotax 912S. Changes include shortened wings, metal flaps, redesigned engine cowling and fairings.
P92-LY
As P92 JS but with Lycoming YO-233-B2A engine instead of Rotax
P92 Echo
Available with 80 hp (60 kW) Rotax 912UL or 100 hp (75 kW) Rotax 912ULS engine.

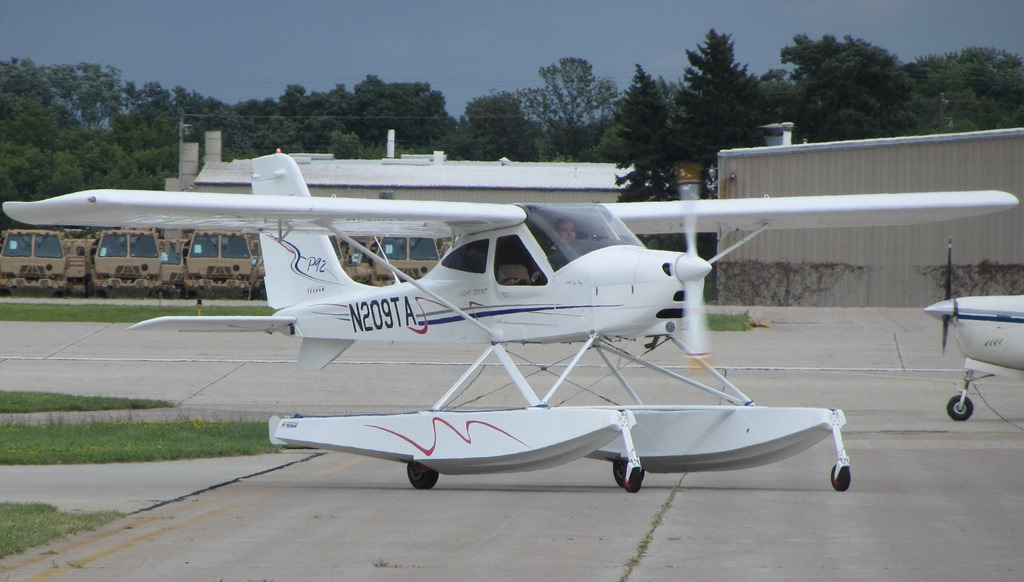
Tecnam P92 Sea-Sky

P92 Sea-Sky
Amphibian version of the P92 Echo, with conventional floats equipped with retractable wheels.
P92-S Echo
Redesigned wings, engine cowling, windshield and fairing to reduce drag. Available with 81 hp (60 kW) Rotax 912U or 100 hp (75 kW) Rotax 912S.
P92 Echo Super
With 100 hp (75 kW) Rotax 912ULS.
P92-J
An upgraded version of the Echo. Available with 81 hp (60 kW) Rotax 912U.
P92 2000RG
Fuselage redesigned, shorter wingspan, retractable landing gear. With 100 hp (75 kW) Rotax 912S engine.
P92-JS
P92 Eaglet
100 hp (75 kW) Rotax 912 engine, adds winglets to improve aerodynamic efficiency
P92 Eaglet G5
As P92 Eaglet but with free-castering nosewheel instead of steerable
P92 Eaglet G5LY
As P92 Eaglet G5 but with Lycoming IO-233-B2A engine instead of Rotax.
P92-TD
A conventional landing gear equipped (taildragger) compliant with the American Light Sport rules, First flown on 22 December 2011 and introduced at Sun 'n Fun 2012.
P92 Echo Light Classic
Tricycle landing gear equipped version with a gross weight of 500 kg (1,102 lb)

== Operators ==
=== Civil ===
The P92 is popular with flight training schools and is also operated by private individuals and companies.

=== Military ===
- Cambodian Air Force

== Specifications (P92 Echo MkII) ==
Data from P92 latest infopage

General characteristics

- Crew: 2
- Length: 6.4 m (21 ft 0 in)
- Wingspan: 8.7 m (28 ft 7 in)
- Height: 2.5 m (8 ft 2 in)
- Empty weight: 356 kg (785 lb)
- Max takeoff weight: 600 kg (1,323 lb)
- Fuel capacity: 90 L (24 US gal; 20 imp gal) total with 80 L (21 US gal; 18 imp gal) usable
- Powerplant: 1 × Rotax 912ULS 4-cylinder air-cooled horizontally-opposed piston engine, 73.5 kW (98.6 hp)
- Propellers: 2-bladed Sensenich

Performance

- Maximum speed: 213 km/h (132 mph, 115 kn) Max cruise speed TAS
- Stall speed: 72 km/h (45 mph, 39 kn) flaps down
- Range: 1,296 km (805 mi, 700 nmi)
- Rate of climb: 4.9 m/s (960 ft/min)
- Take-off run: 214 m (702 ft)
- Landing run: 154 m (505 ft)
- Take-Off Distance: 369 m (1,211 ft)

== See also ==
Aircraft of comparable role, configuration, and era

- Tecnam P2004
