= Tecnam P2002 Sierra =

Italian light aircraft

P2002
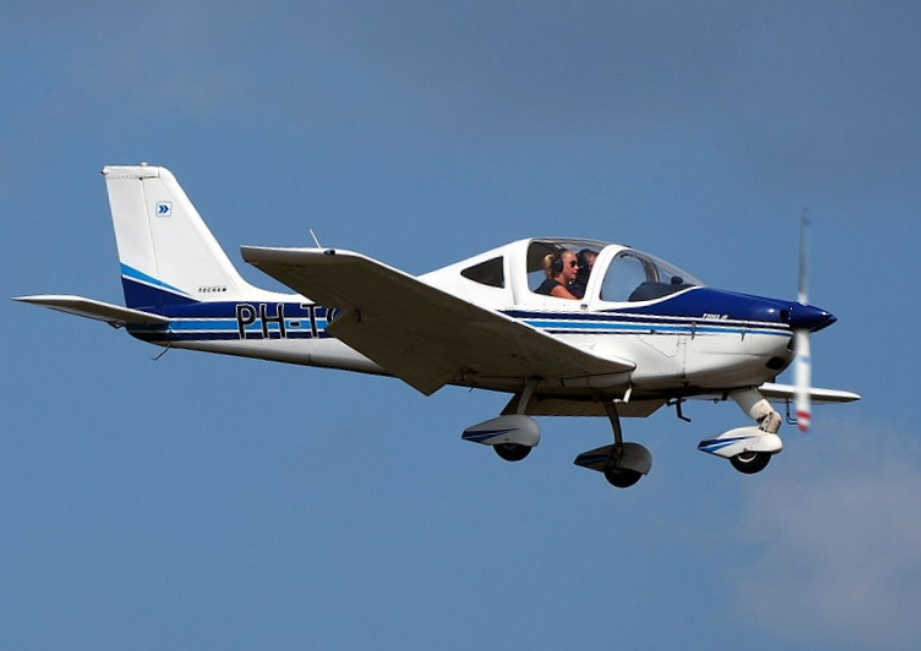
- Tecnam P2002

General information
- Type: Two-seat light single
- National origin: Italy
- Manufacturer: Tecnam

The Tecnam P2002 Sierra is a two-seat, low-wing, light aircraft designed and constructed by the Italian aircraft manufacturer Tecnam. Introduced during the early 2000s, the aircraft quickly became a staple of the company's product lineup, comprising 70 per cent of its available production capacity during some years.

== Development ==
Development of the Tecnam Sierra commenced during 2002. It was developed for compliance with both the very light aircraft (VLA) regulations present in Europe and light sport aircraft (LSA) regulations used in the United States. Under the rules of either area, the aircraft does not need to be provided with a recovery parachute. However, primarily as a consequence of its maximum weight (in a standard configuration) of 580 kg, the Sierra cannot be operated as a LSA in either Australia or Canada due to their lower weight limitation of 550 kg present on LSA.

By 2005, the Sierra had risen to particular prominence in Tecnam's lineup, the company having dedicated around 70 per cent of its total aircraft production capacity to manufacturing the Sierra alone. By this point, the aircraft was being produced at a rate of six per week, while the company claimed to have an order backlog spanning the following six months. Furthermore, the Sierra could also be supplied in a near 'ready to go' configuration suited to the European trainer market, which was one reported consequence of having secured its VLA certification. By mid-2005, Tecnam had reportedly completed delivery of roughly 180 Sierras.

Since the introduction of the original model, Tecnam has continued to develop the Sierra and pursue additional certification of the type. In the 2010s, in response to customer demand for more luxurious features, the firm introduced the improved Sierra MK II; it is available in three styles: standard, premium, and power. During February 2020, it was announced that the Sierra Mk II had been certified as an ultralight aircraft by German authorities, clearing the type for use across most of Europe. Being permitted an increased maximum weight under this certification, the aircraft can thus be equipped with additional equipment such as a Ballistic Recovery Systems (BRS) parachute, new avionics, increased fuel capacity, and various comfort improvements within the cockpit.

== Design ==
The Tecnam P2002 Sierra is a two-seat, low-wing, light aircraft. A major market for the Sierra is the flight training sector; accordingly, its design and several of its major features, such as the use of a low-mounted wing and a bubble canopy, result in the aircraft being particularly well-suited to use as a trainer. Its construction principally comprises conventional aluminium, and enables the aircraft to withstand the maximum load limits of +4/-2g. The wing of the Sierra, consisting of a relatively straightforward planform albeit with stall strips present on the leading edges and gently upturned fairings at the tips, was designed in-house by Tecnam. The wing also accommodates a pair of integral tanks that provides a maximum fuel capacity of 100 litres. The wing is also furnished with electrically actuated flaps that are fully-variable between 0° and 40°; the flaps are controlled via a lever on the base of the left-hand instrument console and their position displayed on a gauge mounted at the top-right portion of the engine instrument cluster.

The aircraft features conventional flight controls, using pushrods and cables that connect with the ailerons, all-moving horizontal stabiliser and rudder. These controls include an electrically actuated pitch trim function, which is operated via two separate buttons on top of each control column for raising and lowering. A steerable nosewheel provides a high degree of ground manoeuvrability, being controlled by the rudder pedals. Hydraulically-actuated disc brakes are present on the main wheels, operated by a vertical lever on the cockpit floor that also controls the parking brake, thus the presence of a locking switch. An engine-driven generator provides electrical power for the flight instrumentation and other onboard equipment, such as the GPS navigation system, VHF radio set, transponder. Some of the instrumentation, such as for the engine, uses analogue gauges. As standard, the instrument console features four flight instruments.

Each aircraft is typically powered by a single Rotax 912 S2 engine, capable of 100 hp (75 kW). In a standard configuration, the engine drives a three-blade fixed-pitch propeller; various alternative propellers can be installed, including both fixed-pitch and variable-pitch models along with two and three-bladed models. The engine is controlled via a pair of push/pull throttle levers, one being centrally mounted at the instrument panel's base and the other to the left of the instrument console, there is no mixture control present. Heating of the cockpit is provided via ducted air from the engine, while cooling and ventilation is provided by multiple side louvers. The cockpit is covered by a sliding bubble canopy, this can be opened mid-flight if desired, although the presence of both a top lock and two side safety locks prevent the canopy opening unintentionally. Even when closed, the bubble canopy reportedly provides excellent levels of external visibility to the pilot.

The Sierra possesses relatively gentle handling qualities, being particularly suited to use as a basic trainer aircraft. In addition to possessing benign stall characteristics, including easily recognisable indications of pre-stall buffeting and being controllable post-stall in roll via the ailerons. In terms of survivability, the aircraft is relatively robust and possesses no apparent deficient aspects to those of contemporary trainer aircraft. According to aerospace periodical Flight International, the Sierra is described as being able to "outperform the old Cessna 150 in virtually every flight regime".

== Variants ==
P2002 LSA
Approved as light-sport aircraft with 600 kg (1,300 lb) gross weight.
P2002 Sierra Mk II
P2002 with revised cabin and avionics, and powered by 135 hp (101 kW) Rotax 915 iS engine. Available in ultralight and LSA approved versions.
P2002 JF
Model with fixed tricycle landing gear. A variable-pitch propeller version was certified by the European Aviation Safety Agency in 2012.
A version with hand controls for disabled pilots is also available factory-fitted.
P2002 JF Sierra Mk II
Improved P2002 JF with revised cabin and avionics.
P2002 JR
Model with inward-retracting hydraulically retractable tricycle landing gear
P2002 EA
Kit Built fixed tricycle landing gear
P2002 RG
Kit Built model with outward-retracting pneumatic retractable tricycle landing gear
Astore
Lighter derivative of P-2002-JF.

Note that certified models have hydraulic gear and propeller, kit RG model has pneumatic gear and electric propeller.

== Operators ==
The P2002 is mostly operated by private individuals and flight schools.

== Military Operators ==
Argentina

- Argentine Air Force

8 P2002JF were ordered in 2016.
Greece

- Hellenic Air Force

12 P2002JF were ordered in May 2018, the first was delivered in October 2018, and the final three delivered on 5 April 2019.

== Specifications (P2002-LSA) ==
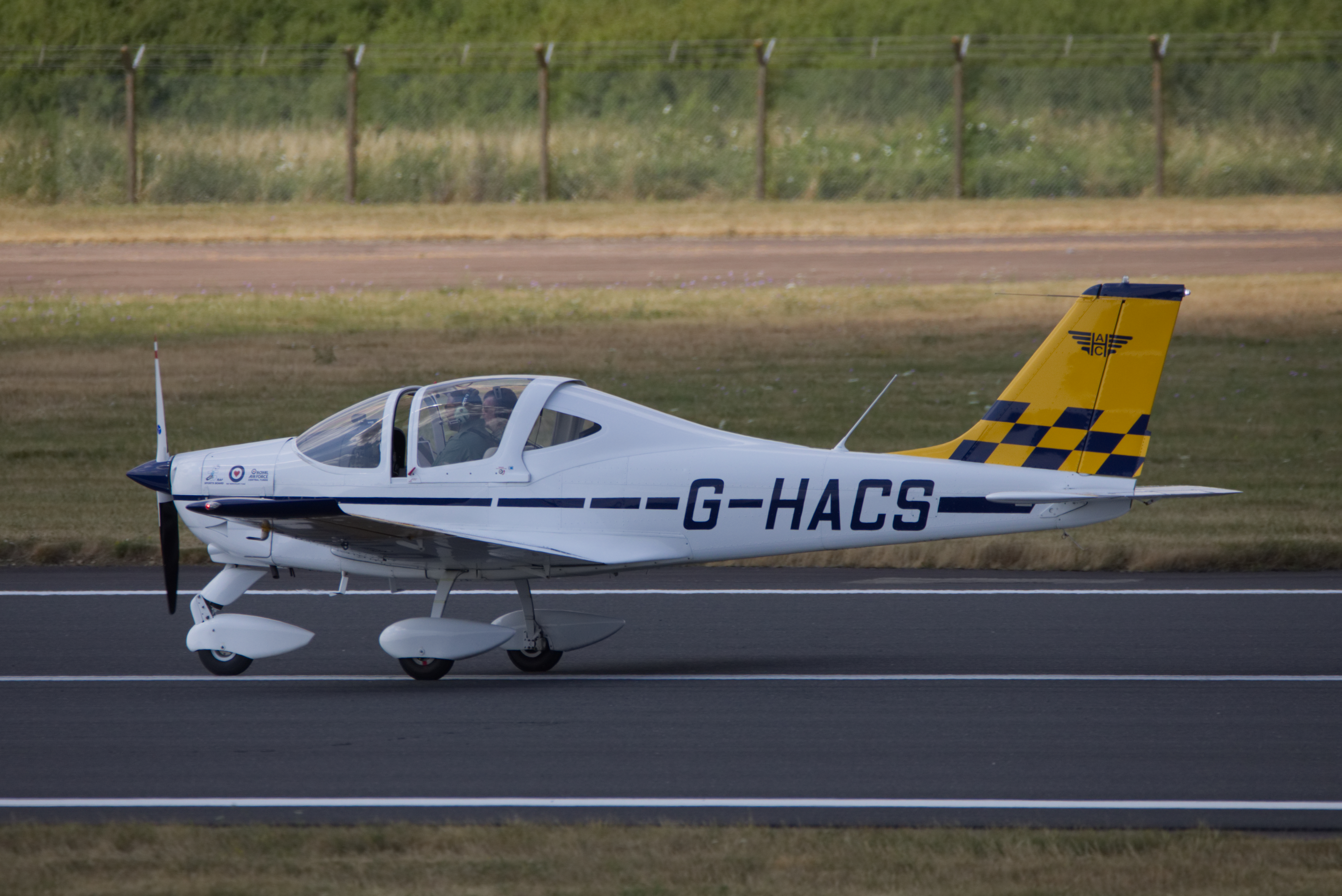
Tecnam P2002-JF in 2018

Data from Jane's All the World's Aircraft 2007–2008

General characteristics

- Crew: 1
- Capacity: 1 passenger
- Length: 6.61 m (21 ft 8 in)
- Wingspan: 8.60 m (28 ft 3 in)
- Height: 2.43 m (8 ft 0 in)
- Wing area: 11.50 m^{2} (123.8 sq ft)
- Aspect ratio: 6.4:1
- Empty weight: 331 kg (730 lb)
- Max takeoff weight: 598 kg (1,318 lb)
- Powerplant: 1 × Rotax 912 S2 , 73.5 kW (100 hp)
- Propellers: 2-bladed, fixed pitch propeller
- Propellers: 1.74 m (5 ft 9 in) diameter

Performance

- Cruise speed: 222 km/h (138 mph, 120 kn) (75% power)
- Stall speed: 71 km/h (44 mph, 38 kn) (flaps down)
- Never exceed speed: 250 km/h (160 mph, 130 kn)
- Range: 1,092 km (679 mi, 590 nmi)
- Service ceiling: 3,995 m (13,110 ft)
- g limits: +6g, -3g
- Rate of climb: 6.2 m/s (1,220 ft/min)
- Takeoff run: 232 m (761 ft)
- Landing run: 186 m (610 ft)
