= Partenavia Astore =

Italian light aircraft

P.48 Astore

General information
- Type: Two-seat cabin monoplane
- National origin: Italy
- Manufacturer: Partenavia
- Designer: Luigi Pascale
- Number built: 1

History
- First flight: 1952

The Partenavia P.48 Astore was a 1950s Italian light aircraft built by Luigi Pascale and his brother in Naples before establishing Partenavia.

== Development ==
The Astore was a strut-braced high-wing cabin monoplane with a fixed tailwheel landing gear. It had two seats in tandem and was powered by a 65 hp (48 kW) Continental A65 engine. The prototype and only Astore, registered I-NAPA, was built in a garage in Naples and first flew in 1952, piloted by Mario de Bernardi.

== Specifications ==
General characteristics

- Crew: one
- Capacity: one passenger
- Powerplant: 1 × Continental A65 , 48 kW (65 hp)

Performance

- Maximum speed: 185 km/h (115 mph, 100 kn)

== See also ==
Related development

- Tecnam Astore - Luigi Pascale design
