= AERO Friedrichshafen =

German aviation show

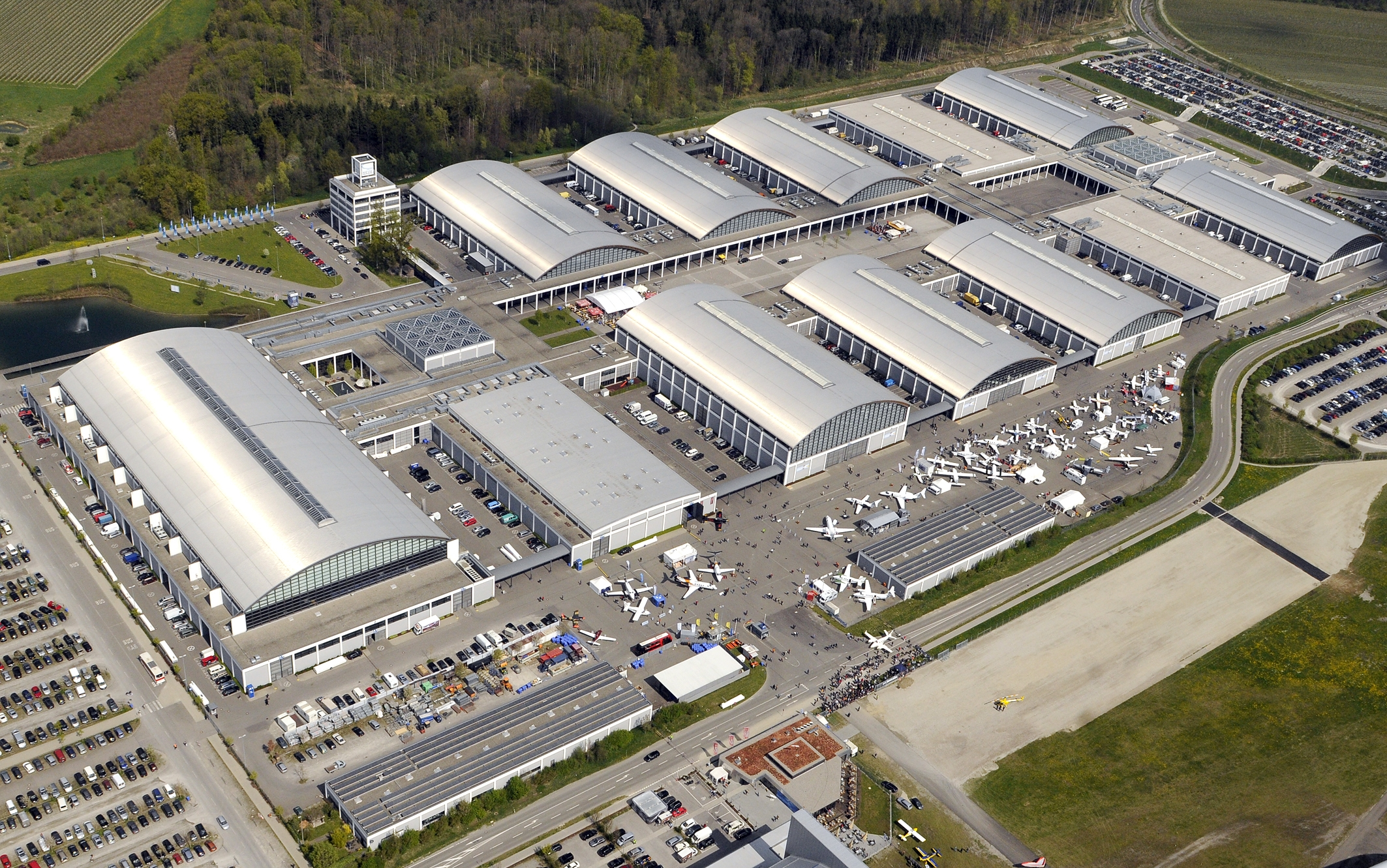
Friedrichshafen's convention center during AERO in 2011

AERO Friedrichshafen is a trade show dedicated to European general aviation. It is held yearly in April on the shores of Lake Constance at the exhibition center of Friedrichshafen, Germany right next to Friedrichshafen Airport.

== History ==
AERO took place for the first time in 1977 during the RMF (Rennsport/Motor/Freizeit; Racing/Motor/Leisure) event. Initially held every two years, AERO became an independent event in 1993 and has been held annually since 2009. The aviation convention now attracts more than 600 exhibitors and 33,000 visitors every year.
