= List of airlines of Denmark =

This is a list of airlines operating under a Danish air operator's certificate, including the Faroe Islands.

Airlines of Greenland are listed in the list of airlines of Greenland.

== Scheduled airlines ==
| Airline | Headquarters | IATA | ICAO | Callsign | Image | Commenced operations | Notes |
|---|---|---|---|---|---|---|---|
| Alsie Express | Sønderborg | 6I | MMD | MERMAID | | 2013 | |
| Atlantic Airways | Vágar Airport | RC | FLI | FAROELINE | | 1988 | Based in Faroe Islands |
| Copenhagen AirTaxi | Roskilde | | CAT | AIRCAT | | 1983 | |
| DAT-Danish Air Transport | Vamdrup | DX | DTR | DANISH | | 1989 | |
| Nordic Seaplanes | Aarhus | | | | | 2016 | Presently not operational |
| Scandinavian Airlines | Kastrup | SK | SAS | SCANDINAVIAN | | 1946 | Joint flag carrier of Denmark, Norway, and Sweden |
| Sun-Air of Scandinavia | Billund | EZ | SUS | SUNSCAN | | 1978 | |

== Charter airlines ==
| Airline | Headquarters | IATA | ICAO | Callsign | Image | Commenced operations | Notes |
|---|---|---|---|---|---|---|---|
| Air Alsie | Sønderborg | 6I | MMD | MERMAID | | 1989 | |
| Air Seven | Roskilde | | CAT | AIRCAT | | 2020 | Operations entrusted to Copenhagen AirTaxi |
| Bel Air Aviation | Esbjerg | | BBX | BLUEBEL | | 1994 | |
| Benair Air Services | Skjern | | BDI | BIRDIE | | 2000 | |
| Billund Rundflyvning | Billund | | | | | | |
| Bornfly | Rønne | | BOF | BORNFLIGHT | | | |
| Cowi Aerial Survey | N/A | | | COWI | | | |
| FlexFlight | Roskilde | W2 | FXT | | | 2006 | |
| Helico | Jordrup | | HKO | | | | |
| Jettime | Copenhagen | | JTD | | | 2006 | |
| Newcopter | Copenhagen | | | | | | |
| Nordic Aviation Capital | Billund | | | | | 1990 | see IRELAND entry |
| North Flying | Aalborg | M3 | NFA | NORTH FLYING | | 1963 | |
| Starling Air | Marstal | | | | | | |
| Sunclass Airlines | Copenhagen | DK | VKG | VIKING | | 2019 | Previously Thomas Cook Airlines Scandinavia |
| Uni-Fly | Odense | | UNC | UNICOPTER | | | |

== Cargo airlines ==
| Airline | Headquarters | IATA | ICAO | Callsign | Image | Commenced operations | Notes |
|---|---|---|---|---|---|---|---|
| Maersk Air Cargo | Dragør | | SRR | WHITESTAR | | 1987 | Previously Star Air |

== See also ==
- List of airlines
- List of defunct airlines of Denmark
- List of airlines of Greenland
