= RKE =

RKE may refer to:

- Remote keyless entry system, to unlock a car
- Rank Kellner Eyepiece
- Roskilde Airport, Copenhagen, Denmark
- Rancher Labs Kubernetes Engine, software used in cloud computing
