= A1P =

A1P may refer to:

- A1p, a stellar classification for Ap and Bp stars
- America First Policies, a Trump campaign organization
- Lycoming O-360-A1P aircraft engine, a Lycoming O-360 variant
