= NHV =

NHV is three-letter abbreviation which may represent any of the following:

- National Herbarium of Victoria in Australia
- Netherlands Handball Association, the national Handball association in Netherlands.
- New Haven Union Station in New Haven, Connecticut (Amtrak code)
- Nuku Hiva Airport on Nuku Hiva in French Polynesia (IATA airport code)
- Temascaltepec, Nahuatl language (ISO 639 code)
- Noise, vibration, and harshness
- Noordzee Helikopters Vlaanderen
