= List of airlines of Greenland =

This is a list of past and present airlines of Greenland.

Airline	IATA	ICAO	Callsign	Image	Founded	Ceased operations	Notes	Hub
Air Alpha Greenland	GD	AHA	AIR ALPHA		1994		Purchased by Air Greenland in 2006	Ilulissat Airport
Air Greenland	GL	GRL	GREENLAND		1960			Kangerlussuaq Airport
AirZafari					2010			Ilulissat Airport
Arctic Travel Group					2000	2010		
Greenlandair	GL	GRL	Grønlandsfly		1960	2002	Renamed Air Greenland	
Greenland Express					2013	2014	Renamed Sky Greenland	
Nuna Air					2000	2012		
Sky Greenland		DNM	DENIM		2014	2016	Virtual airline	
Suluit Air					2000	2012		

== See also ==
- List of airlines
- List of airlines of Denmark
- List of defunct airlines of Denmark
