= NHV Group =

Helicopter operator

NHV is a helicopter operator based in Ostend, Belgium, specialising in offshore helicopter services. The company has over 450 employees worldwide, and its majority shareholder is the private investment firm Ardian.

NHV primarily serves the energy industry, including Oil and Gas and Renewables, with operations in the North Sea Region and West Africa. In 2014, NHV became the global launch customer of the Airbus H175 Helicopter.

== History ==
NHV was founded in 1997 by Eric Van Hal, Jef De Kinder, and William Wilford. Originally named Noordzee Helikopters Vlaanderen, the company began operations in Ostend, Belgium, providing helicopter transportation for the Flemish Shipping Pilot Service. Its first aircraft was the MSN 6510 Dauphin N3. By 2001, NHV expanded into ambulance and emergency medical services (HEMS) in France, later extending these operations to Belgium. In 2006, NHV began offshore operations, including transporting shipping pilots for the Dutch coastguard and entering the Oil and Gas sector. Between 2008 and 2010, the company expanded into the UK, opening a base in Norwich, and into West Africa, launching offshore flights from Ghana and later Nigeria with the Leonardo AW139. NHV further expanded its operations in 2011 by Search and Rescue (SAR) coverage of the Dutch maritime territories. They completed over 1000 rescue missions in the North Sea, off the coast of Belgium and Holland.

In 2011, NHV began operating Search and Rescue (SAR) missions in the North Sea, conducting over 1,000 rescue missions in collaboration with Dutch authorities. The company also supported Offshore Wind Farm maintenance in Belgium from 2012 onward. In 2013, NHV opened a base at Den Helder Airport in the Netherlands, supporting the Oil and Gas industry and SAR operations. That year, Ardian acquired a majority stake in NHV. In 2014, NHV expanded further by acquiring the Blueway Group, which included Airlift, BlueWay Offshore, DanCopter, and Vertech Offshore.

In 2018, NHV received ISO9001 accreditation for Quality, Health, Safety, and Environment. The company also adjusted its UK operations post-Brexit by adding seven aircraft to a UK Air Operator Certificate. In 2020, NHV opened a new base Midden-Zeeland for offshore wind farm activities and the UK Blackpool Oil and Gas base for passenger transfers in the East Irish Sea. The company also sold six H155 helicopters to Air Greenland. In 2021, NHV secured a contract with the German Army for maintenance and training and established the NHV Training Academy for engineers and pilots. That year, NHV sold Airlift to Norwegian company Arne Stand Golding AS. In November 2022, NHV ceased Dutch search and rescue operations and marked its 25th anniversary with events across its European and West African bases.

== Operations ==
NHV provides crew and cargo transportation for offshore Oil and Gas installations and wind farms. The company also conducts hoist operations for shipping pilots and wind turbine maintenance. NHV has operated SAR missions in the North Sea in collaboration with the Dutch coastguard. NHV operates the NHV Academy, an EASA PART 147-certified training centre for maintenance technicians and pilots. The company is also an Approved Training Organization (ATO). NHV provides third-party maintenance services and is a certified provider of rotor wing maintenance, repair, and overhaul (MRO) services.

== Bases ==
NHV's headquarters are located at Ostend Airport, Belgium, with operational bases in:

- United Kingdom – Aberdeen International Airport, Norwich Airport, Blackpool Airport
- Netherlands - Den Helder Airport, Rotterdam
- Denmark – Esbjerg
- Ivory Coast – Abidjan

NHV also operates maintenance facilities in Lanvéoc, France, and Laupheim, Germany.

== Fleet ==
NHV's fleet includes:

- Airbus H175
- Airbus H145D2/D3
- Airbus AS365N3
- Leonardo AW169
- Leonardo AW139
