= Ærø Airport =

Ærø Airport Ærø Flyveplads
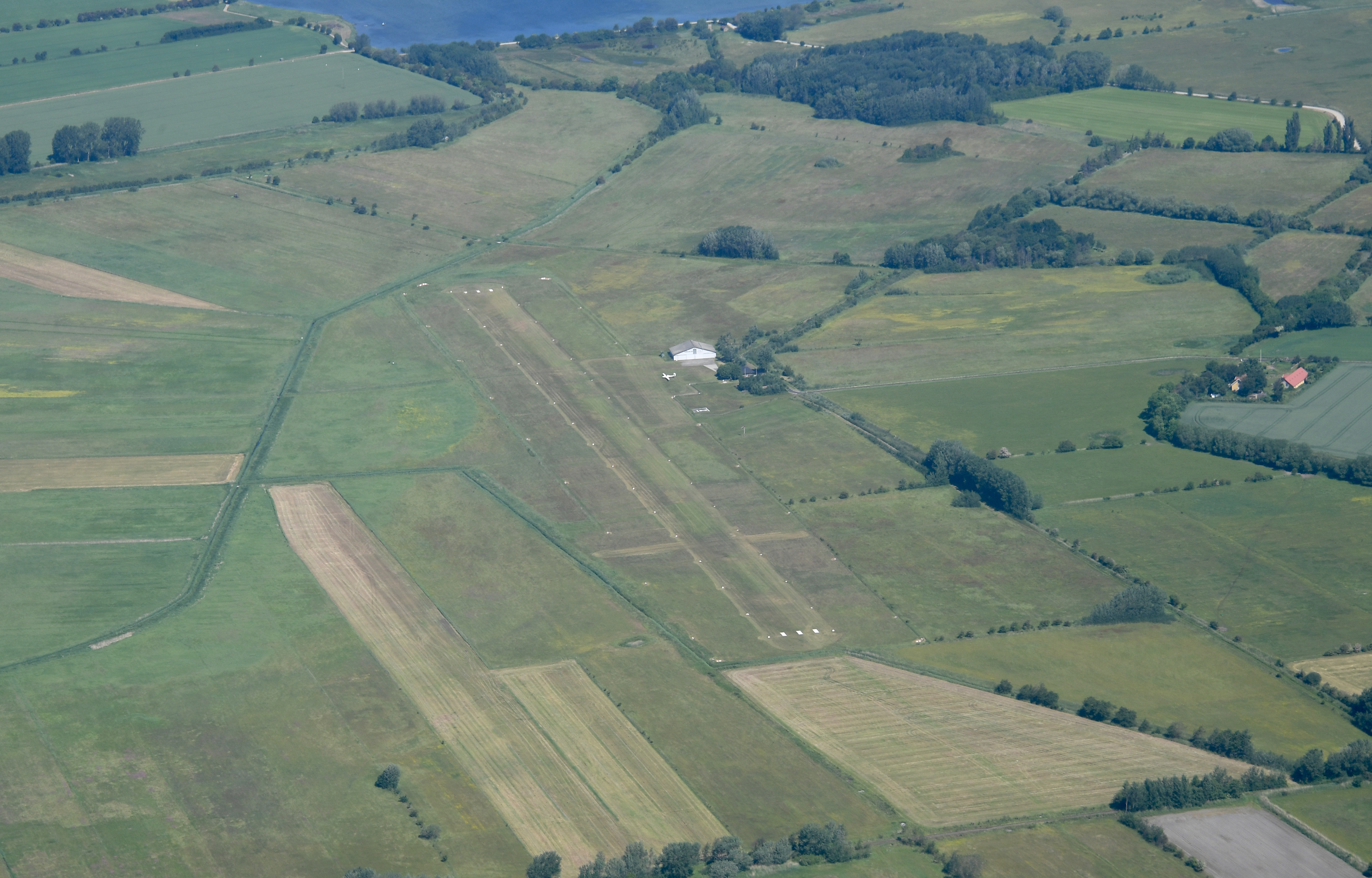
- IATA: none; ICAO: EKAE

Summary
- Airport type: Public
- Serves: Ærøskøbing, Marstal
- Location: Ærø, Denmark
- Elevation AMSL: 3 ft / 1 m
- Coordinates: 54°51′13″N 10°27′21″E
- Website: https://www.visitaeroe.dk/aeroe/explore/aeroe-flyveplads-gdk612157

Map
- Location of airport in Denmark

Runways
Direction	Length		Surface
Direction	m	ft	Surface
15/33	789	2,589	Grass

Ærø Airport (or Ærø Airfield, Danish: Ærø Flyveplads, internationally also spelt Aeroe) (ICAO: EKAE) is an airport located on the Ærø island, in Ærø Municipality, Region of Southern Denmark (Region Syddanmark), Denmark.

== Airlines and destinations ==
The following airline operate regular scheduled flights at the airport:

Airlines	Destinations
Starling Air	Ringsted, Roskilde, Svendborg

== Facilities ==
The airport has one runway with a grass surface, measuring 789 by 30 metres (2,589 ft × 98 ft).
