= Læsø Airport =

Danish airport on the island of Læsø

Læsø Airfield Læsø Flyveplads
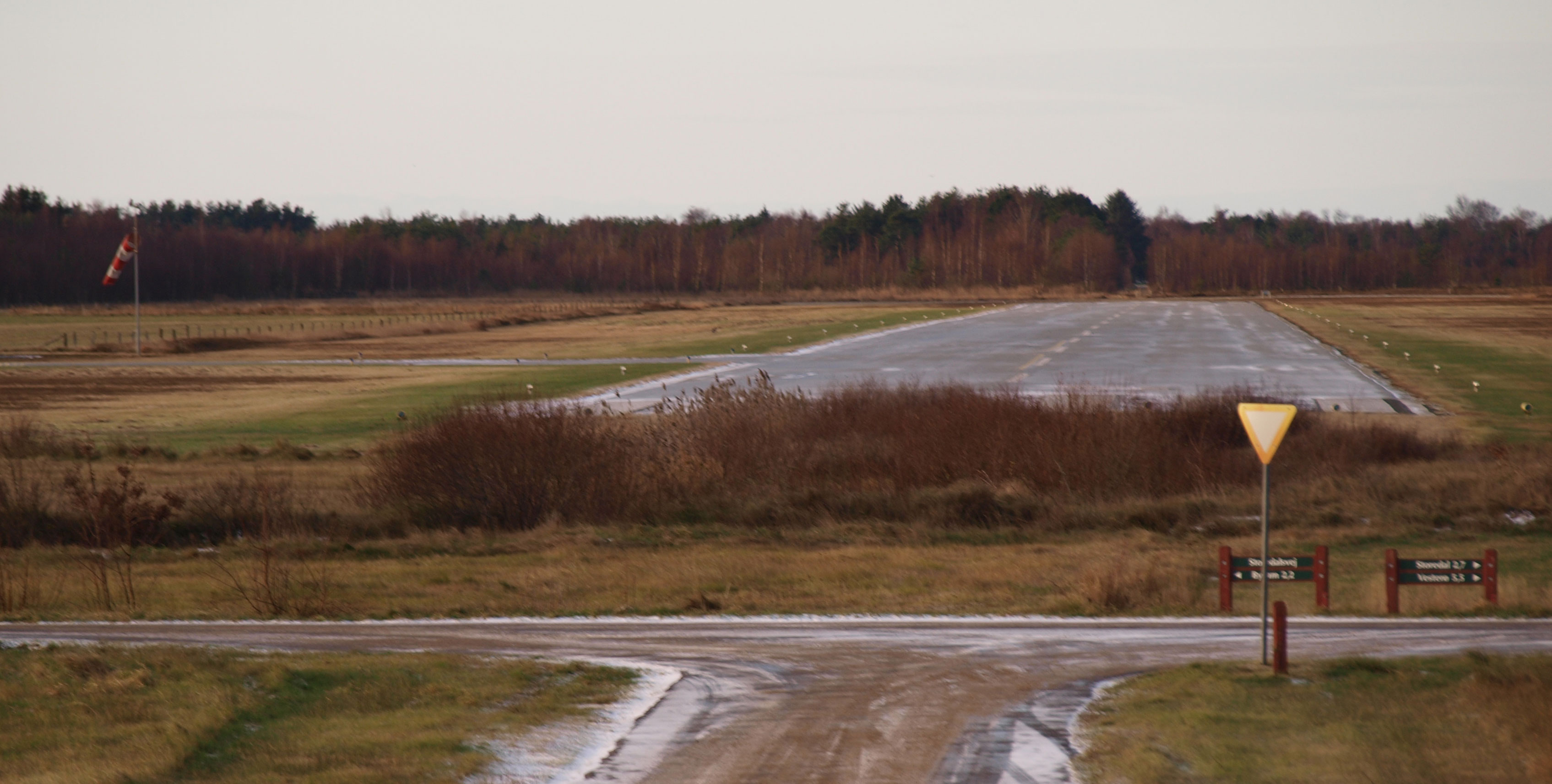
- IATA: BYR; ICAO: EKLS

Summary
- Airport type: Public
- Owner: Læsø Kommune
- Serves: Læsø
- Location: Byrum
- Elevation AMSL: 8 m (26 ft)
- Coordinates: 57°16′37″N 010°59′59″E
- Website: www.laesoe.dk

Map
- Location of the airport in Denmark

Runways
Direction	Length		Surface
Direction	m	ft	Surface
07/25	928	3,045	Asphalt

Læsø Airport (IATA: BYR, ICAO: EKLS) (internationally also called Laeso Airport) is located on the island of Læsø, in the North Denmark Region of Denmark.

== Airlines and destinations ==
The following airlines operate regular scheduled and charter flights at the airport:

Airlines	Destinations
Copenhagen Air Taxi	Anholt, Roskilde
Nordic Seaplanes	Seasonal: Aalborg, Copenhagen Sea Airport (Both end 14. August 2026)

== Ground transport ==
Taxis serve the whole Island. There are no scheduled bus services operating from the airport.

== Future ==
There are plans to extend the runway to 1500 meters and build a new terminal building with more room and proper security check, so that larger aircraft can go there. Financing was as of 2022 not in place. For the small taxi aircraft, only a manual security check is made.

== See also ==
- List of the largest airports in the Nordic countries
