= Partenavia P.68 =

Small twin-engined transport aircraft

P.68
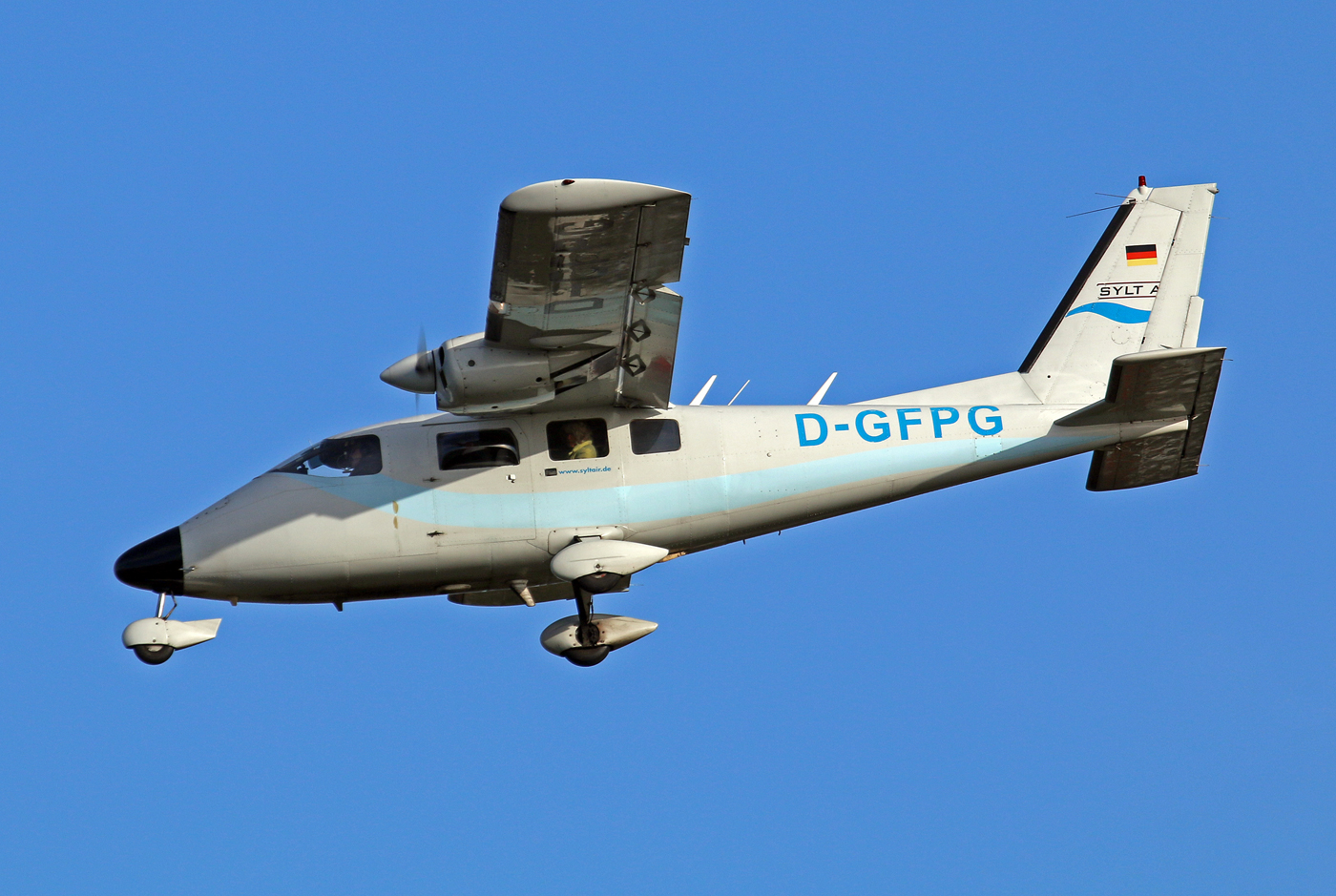
- Partenavia P.68B

General information
- Type: Light transport
- Manufacturer: Partenavia; Vulcanair
- Designer: Luigi Pascale
- Status: In service
- Number built: 431+

History
- Manufactured: 1970-present
- First flight: 25 May 1970

The Partenavia P.68, now Vulcanair P68, is a light aircraft designed by Luigi Pascale and initially built by Italian company Partenavia. It made its first flight on 25 May 1970, its type certification was granted on 17 November 1971 and was transferred to Vulcanair in 1998. The original six-seat high-wing monoplane is powered by twin piston engines and is used for light transport and training. The P.68 Observer is an observation aircraft variant, and it was developed in a stretched, 10/11-seat twin turboprop derivative.

== Development ==
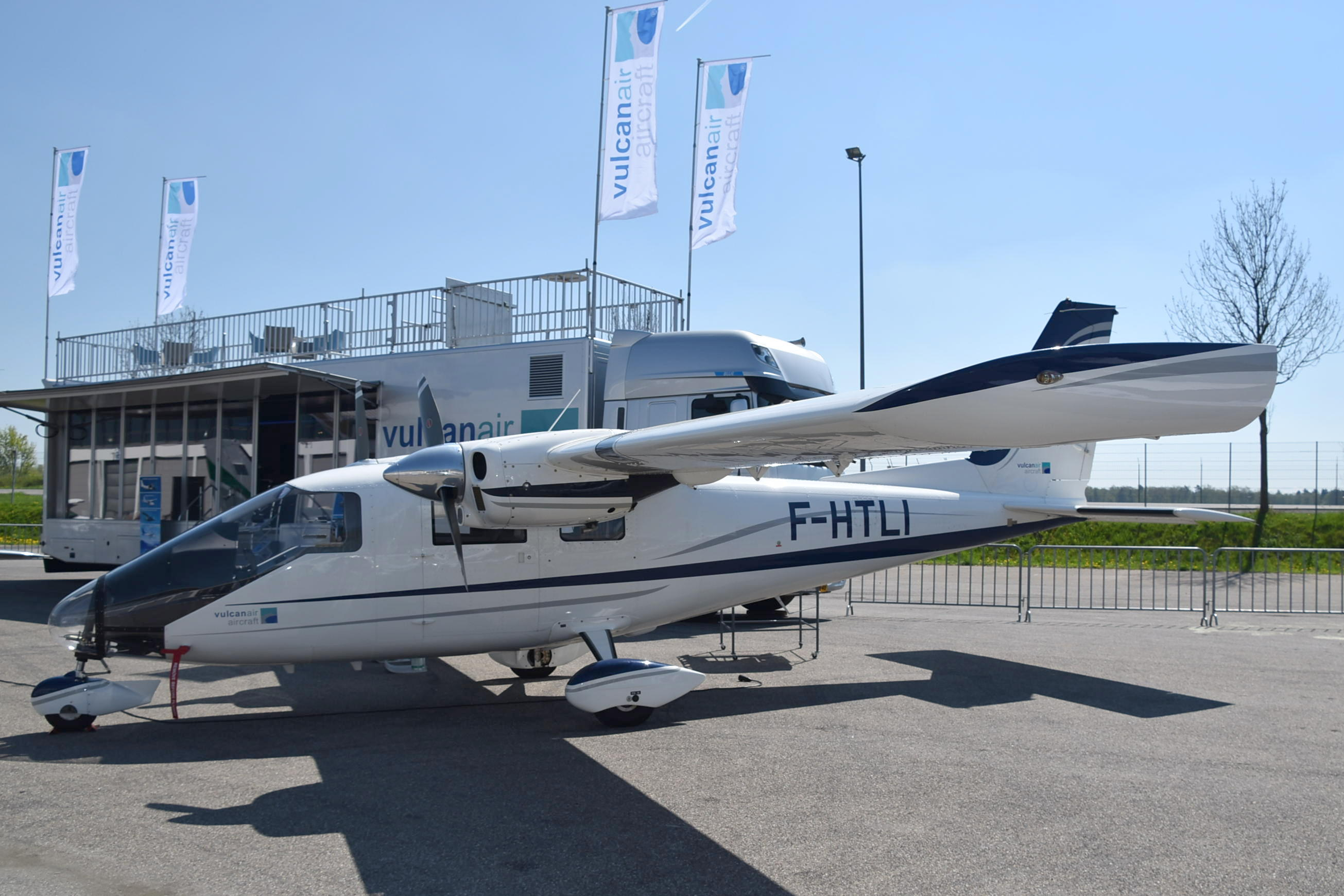
A P.68 Observer presented by Vulcanair at the AERO Friedrichshafen 2016

=== Partenavia P.68 Victor ===
The type certification for the P.68 Victor, a twin piston engine, high wing monoplane with fixed tricycle landing gear was applied for on 22 January 1969. The Partenavia P.68 was designed as a six-seat light transport and trainer powered by two 200 hp (149 kW) Lycoming IO-360 engines, it made its first flight on 25 May 1970 at Naples. The type certification for the 9.20 m (30.18 ft) long P.68 was granted by the Italian Civil Aviation Authority on 17 November 1971 for an 1860 kg (4100 lb) MTOW. It was approved by the FAA on 7 December 1971. After 300 h of flight tests, production was to start in May 1972 in a new plant at Naples Capodichino Airport at a rate of three aircraft per month. The prototype was built at Arzano, Italy, production began with 14 pre-production aircraft at new facilities in Casoria, Italy.

The longer, 9.35 m (30.68 ft) P.68B Victor certification was applied for on 18 October 1973 and granted on 24 May 1974 for a 1960 kg (4321 lb) MTOW. Its unit cost was US$82,000 in 1974 (US$535000 today). Its fuselage was lengthened to create more space in the cockpit.

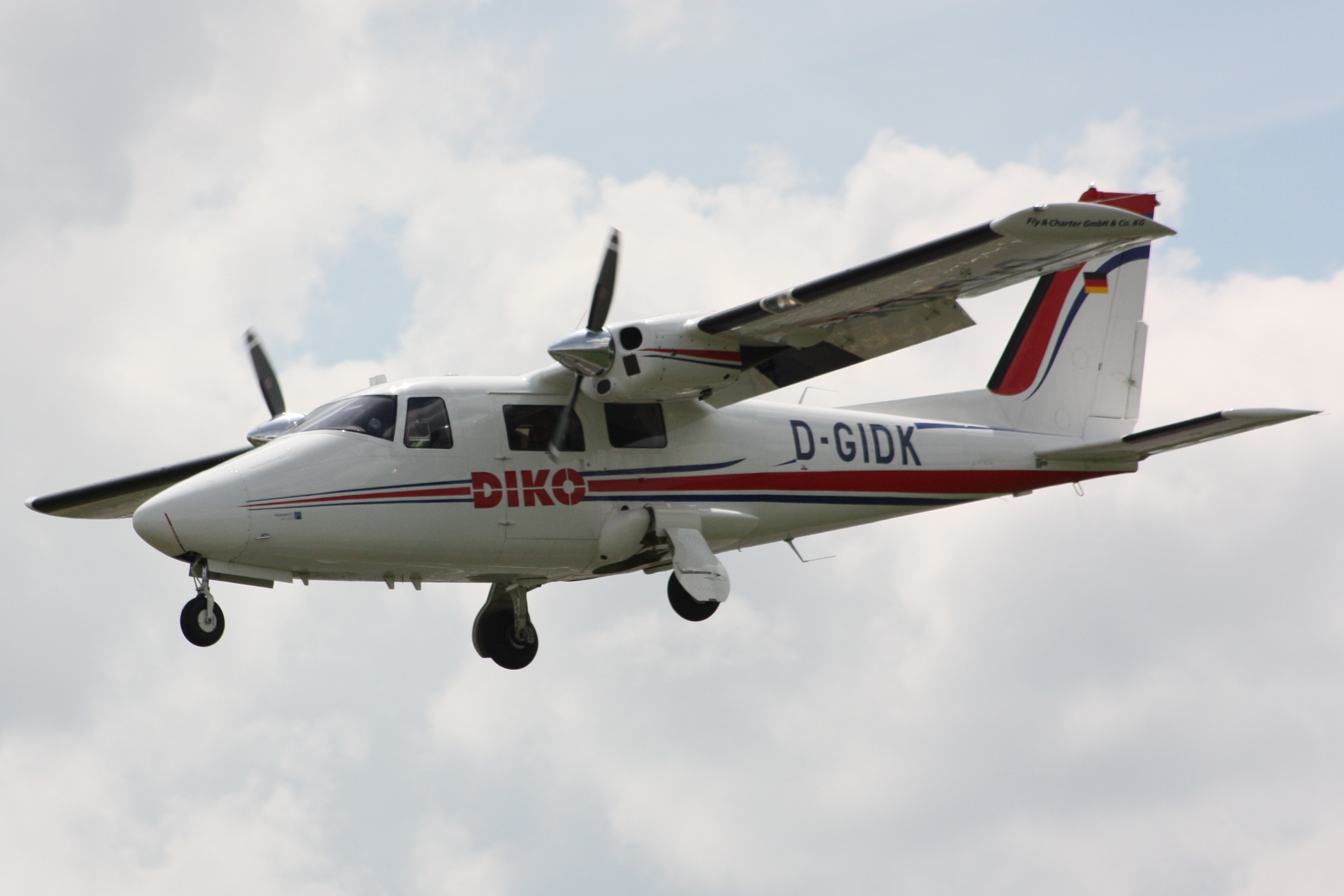
P.68R with retractable undercarriage

Both derived from the P.68B and 9.55 m (31.33 ft) long, the P.68R Victor has a retractable landing gear and was certified on 31 July 1978 while the P.68C has a nose allowing a weather radar, larger fuel tanks and increased weights, and was certified on 23 July 1979 with a 1990 kg (4387 lb) MTOW. The P.68C-TC, certified on 29 April 1980, has turbocharged, 210 hp (157 kW) Lycoming TIO-360-C1A6D engines. In 2021, the equipped price of the P.68C was US$1.25M, US$1.5M for the P.68R and US$1.55M for the P.68C-TC.

=== Partenavia P.68 Observer ===
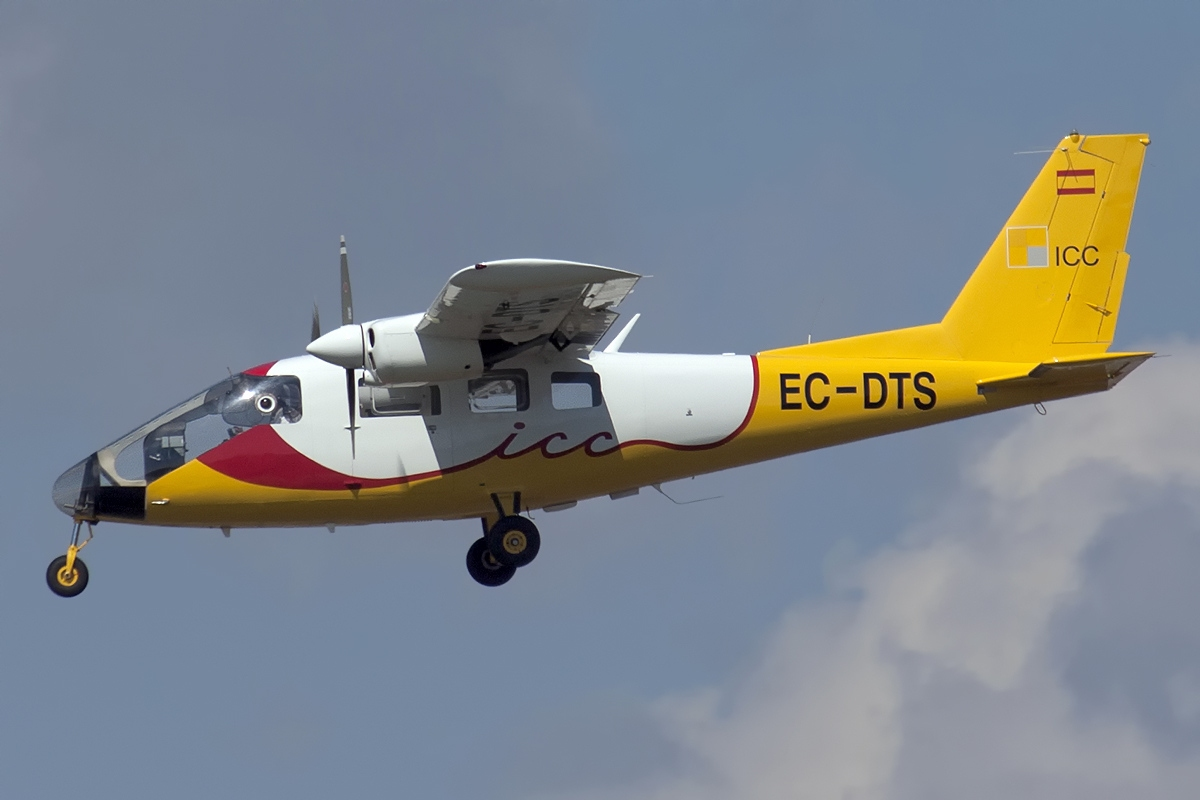
P.68 Observer with a transparent nose

The 9.43 m (30.94 ft) long P.68 Observer, derived from the P.68B with a transparent fuselage nose, adapted systems and larger fuel tanks, was certified on 12 June 1980. The observation aircraft for law enforcement were initially conversions of existing aircraft by German Sportavia-Putzer.

The 9.15 m (30.02 ft) long P.68TC Observer, a P.68 "Observer" with turbocharged engines, was certified on 18 June 1985.

The 9.54 m (31.30 ft) long P.68 "Observer 2 is a P.68 "Observer", with increased weights, upturned wing tips and modified systems, and was certified on 30 November 1989 for a 2084 kg (4594 lb) MTOW.

=== Partenavia AP68TP-600 Viator ===
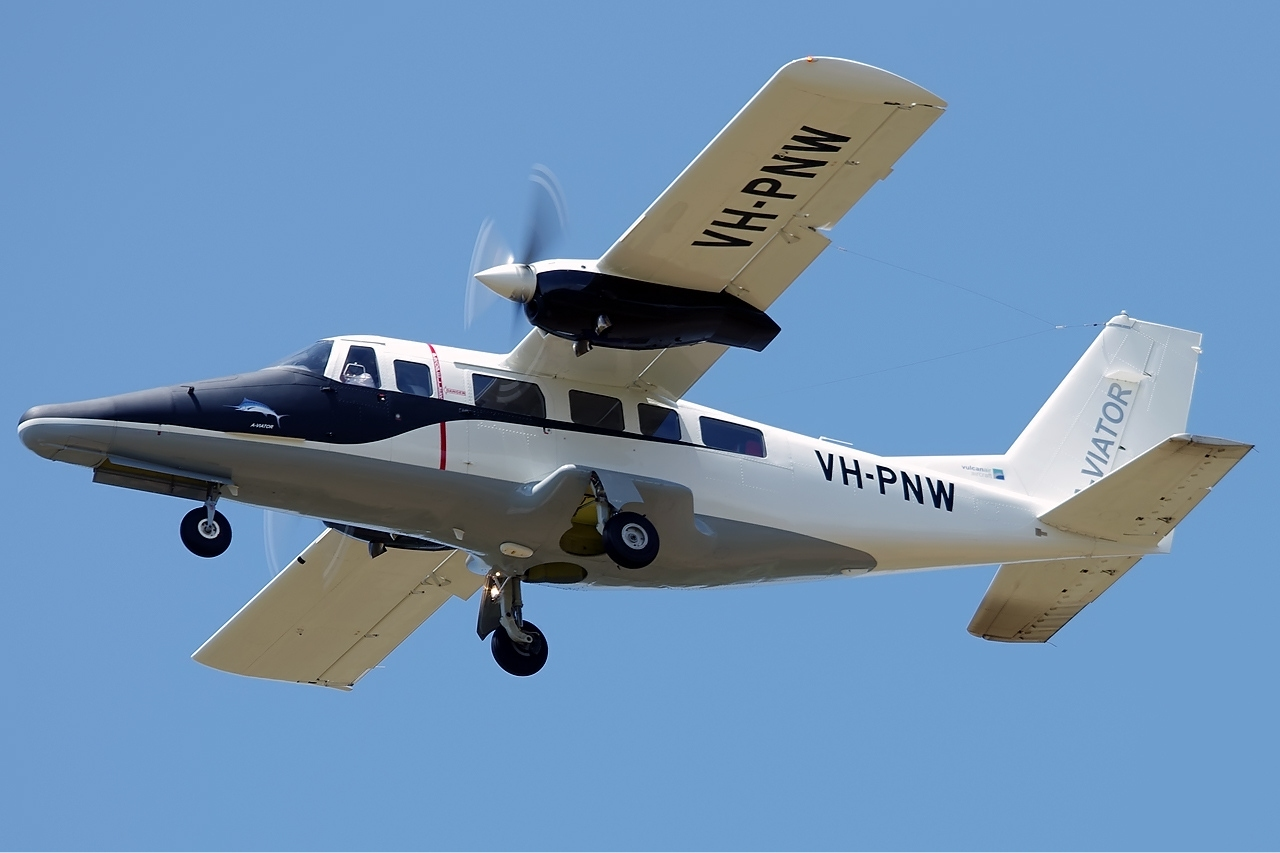
Turboprop-powered AP.68TP-600 Viator with stretched fuselage and retractable gear

The 10.89-11.27 m (35.73-36.97 ft) long, retractable gear AP68TP-600 "Viator", with two 328 hp (245 kW) Allison 250-B17C turboprops, has a 2850–3000 kg (6283-6614 lb) MTOW and was certified on 16 October 1986. In 2023, its equipped price was $3.5M.

=== Partenavia AP68TP-300 Spartacus ===
The 9.90 m (32.48 ft) long, fixed gear AP68TP-300 Spartacus was certified on 10 December 1983 with two 328 hp (245 kW) Allison 250-B17C turboprops and a 2600 kg (5732 lb) MTOW. The nine-seater development was helped by Aeritalia. The prototype first flew in 1978 with a retractable undercarriage.

Based in Casoria, Naples, and already manufacturing Partenavia spares, Vulcanair (then Air Samanta) acquired the type certificate, aircraft spares and the former production plant in Milan for L1.4 billion ($780,000) in April 1998. The type certificate was transferred on 25 November. Vulcanair offers the P.68R, P68C, P.68C-TC, P.68TC Observer, P.68 Observer 2 and AP68TP-600 Viator.

== Variants ==
Type certificate data sheet
Variant	Certified	MTOW	Engines	Length	Built
P.68 Victor	17 Nov 1971	1860 (4100 lb)	200 hp (149 kW); IO-360-A1B6	9.20 m (30.18 ft)	14
P.68B Victor	24 May 1974	1960 kg (4321 lb)	200 hp (149 kW); IO-360-A1B6	9.35 m (30.68 ft)	190
P. 68 Observer	12 Jun 1980	1960 kg (4321 lb)	200 hp (149 kW); IO-360-A1B6	9.43 m (30.94 ft)	>21
P.68R Victor	31 Jul 1978	1960 kg (4321 lb)	200 hp (149 kW); IO-360-A1B6	9.55 m (31.33 ft)	1
P.68 Observer 2	30 Nov 1989	2084 kg (4594 lb)	200 hp (149 kW); IO-360-A1B6	9.55 m (31.33 ft)	
P.68C	23 Jul 1979	1990 kg (4387 lb)	200 hp (149 kW); IO-360-A1B6	9.55 m (31.33 ft)	>126
P.68C-TC	29 Apr 1980	1990 kg (4387 lb)	210 hp (157 kW); TIO-360-C1A6D	9.55 m (31.33 ft)	>36
P.68TC Observer	18 Jun 1985	1990 kg (4387 lb)	210 hp (157 kW); TIO-360-C1A6D	9.15 m (30.02 ft)	
AP68TP-300 Spartacus	10 Dec 1983	2600 kg (5732 lb)	328 hp (245 kW); Allison 250-B17C	9.90 m (32.48 ft)	>13
AP68TP-600 Viator	16 Oct 1986	2850–3000 kg (6283-6614 lb)	328 hp (245 kW); Allison 250-B17C	10.89-11.27 m (35.73-36.97 ft)	>6

== Operators ==
=== Military and government operators ===
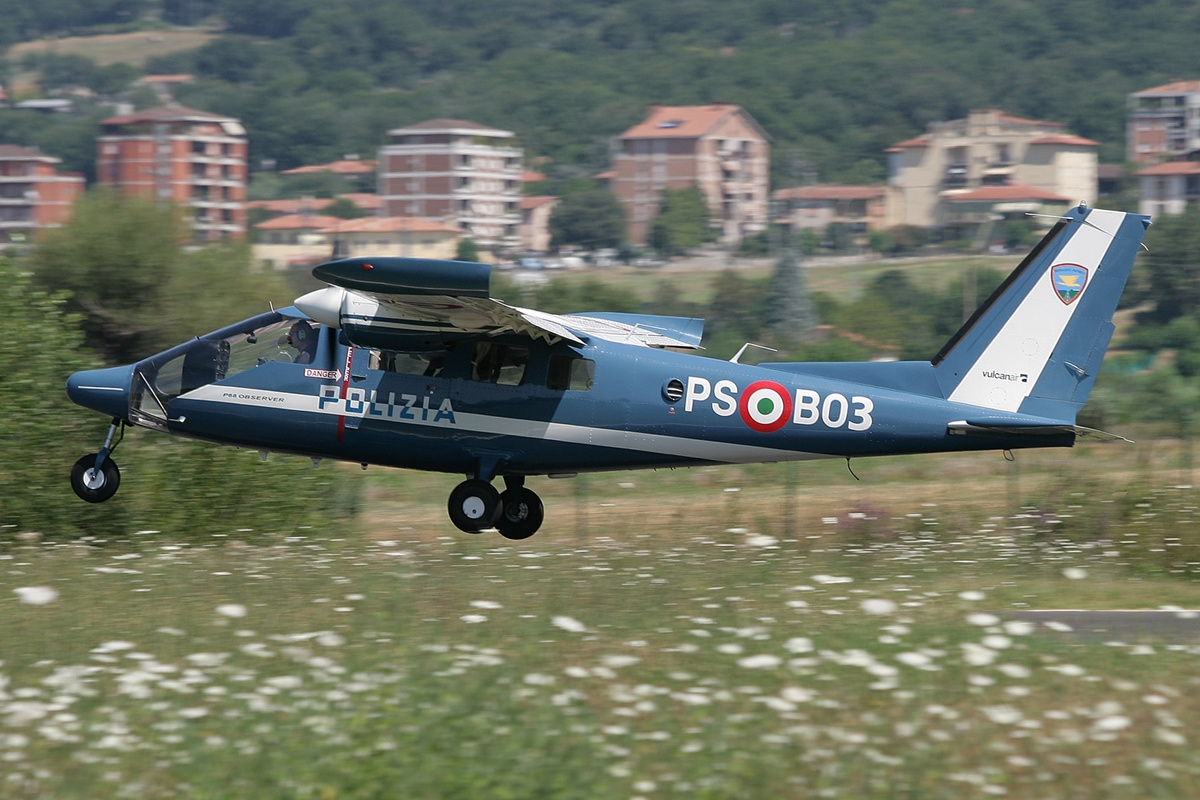
Italian State Police P.68 Observer

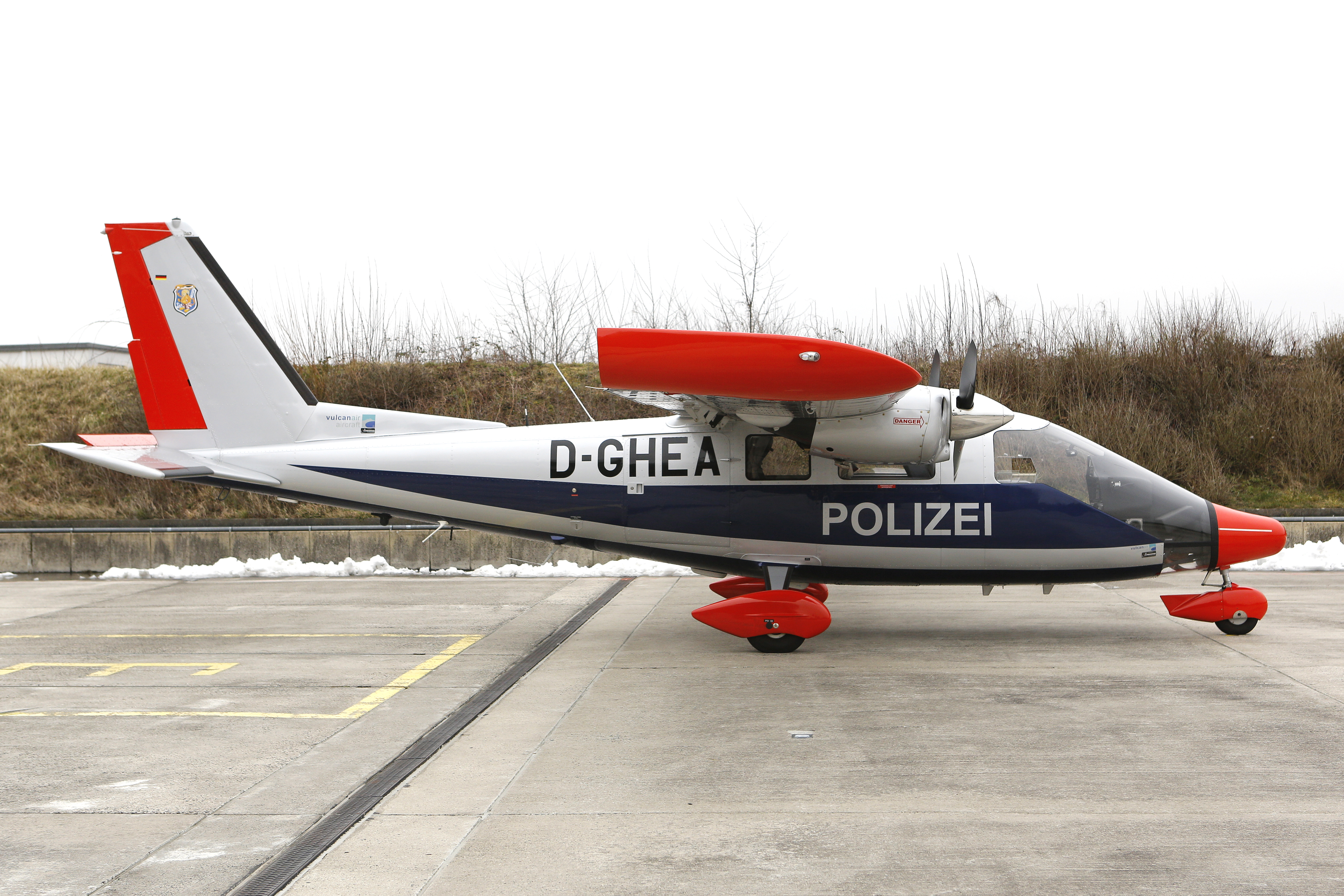
Hessen State Police P.68 Observer 2

Bahamas

- Royal Bahamas Defence Force

Chile

- Chilean Navy

Germany

- Hessen State Police

Indonesia

- Indonesian Navy (on order)

Italy

- Italian State Police

United Kingdom

- National Police Air Service

United States

- California Department of Fish and Game
- New York State Police
- Tennessee Wildlife Resources Agency
- Washington State Department of Natural Resources
- Florida Fish & Wildlife Conservation Commission
- Oregon Department of Forestry
- New Mexico Department of Game and Fish

=== Former ===
Bophuthatswana

- Bophutatswana Air Force

West Germany

- Hessen State Police

== Incidents and accidents ==
The P.68 was involved in 86 accidents and incidents worldwide as reported in the Aviation Safety Network wiki database, including 58 hull losses.

September 11, 1983: A P.68C, N29561, performing an aerobatic display broke up in flight during an airshow in Plainview, Texas. The NTSB report revealed that analysis of the video showed the aircraft performed a fly-by over the runway, exceeding its Vne (Velocity, never-exceed) speed by 27 knots. The pilot then executed a sharp nose-up pitch change of about 8 degrees, which spiked the aircraft's dynamic load factor to 8.3Gs and caused both wings to fail in the main spar just outside both engine nacelles then separate from the aircraft, which then began rotating, causing the rear fuselage to twist along its length between its cabin and empennage. The aircraft then plummeted 250 feet down just beyond the group of spectators.

November 20, 2025: A P.68C, enroute from Sligo, Ireland to Beziers, France crashed near Waterford Airport killing the pilot who was the sole occupant of the aircraft.

== Specifications (P.68C) ==
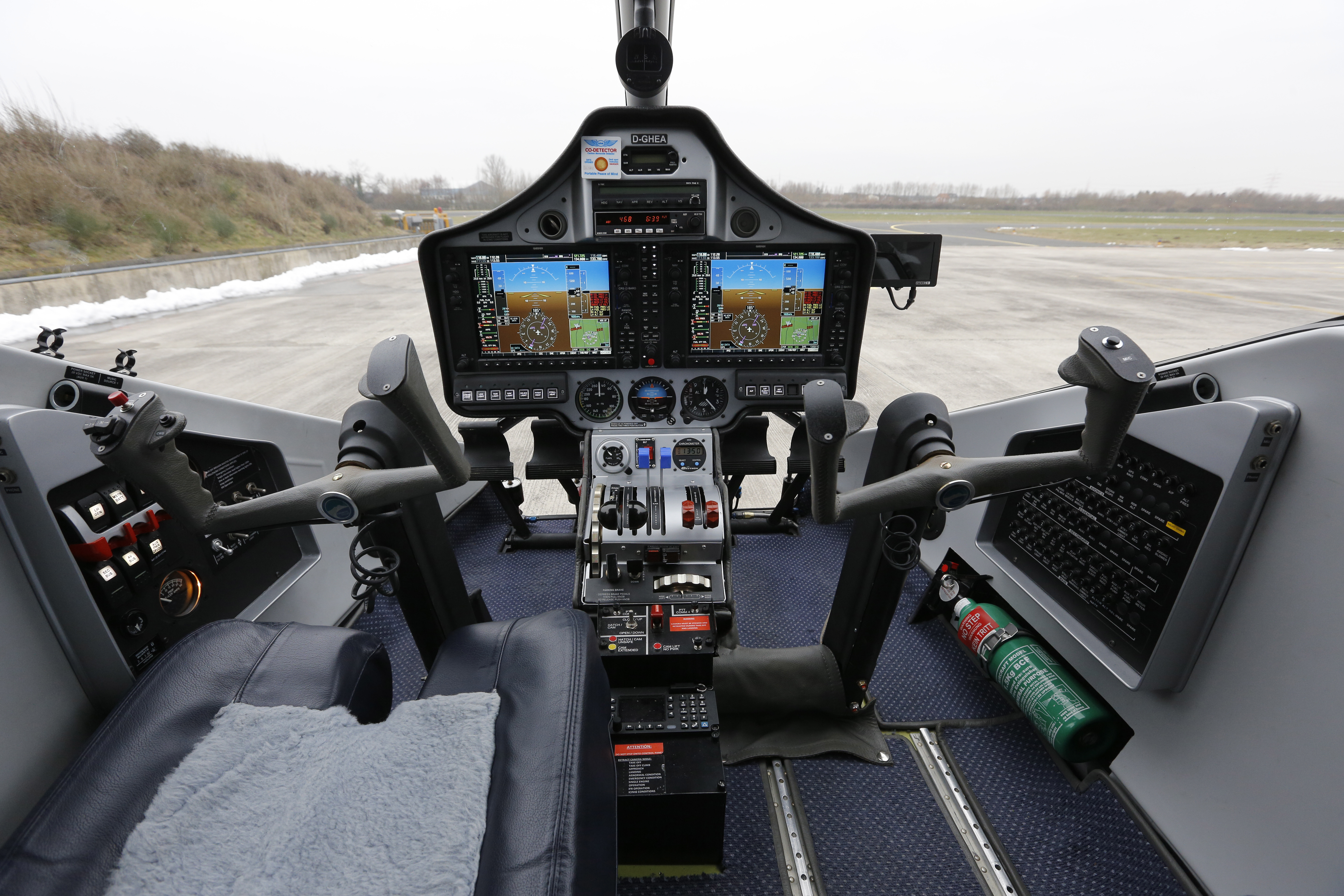
The Observer cockpit with an EFIS flight deck

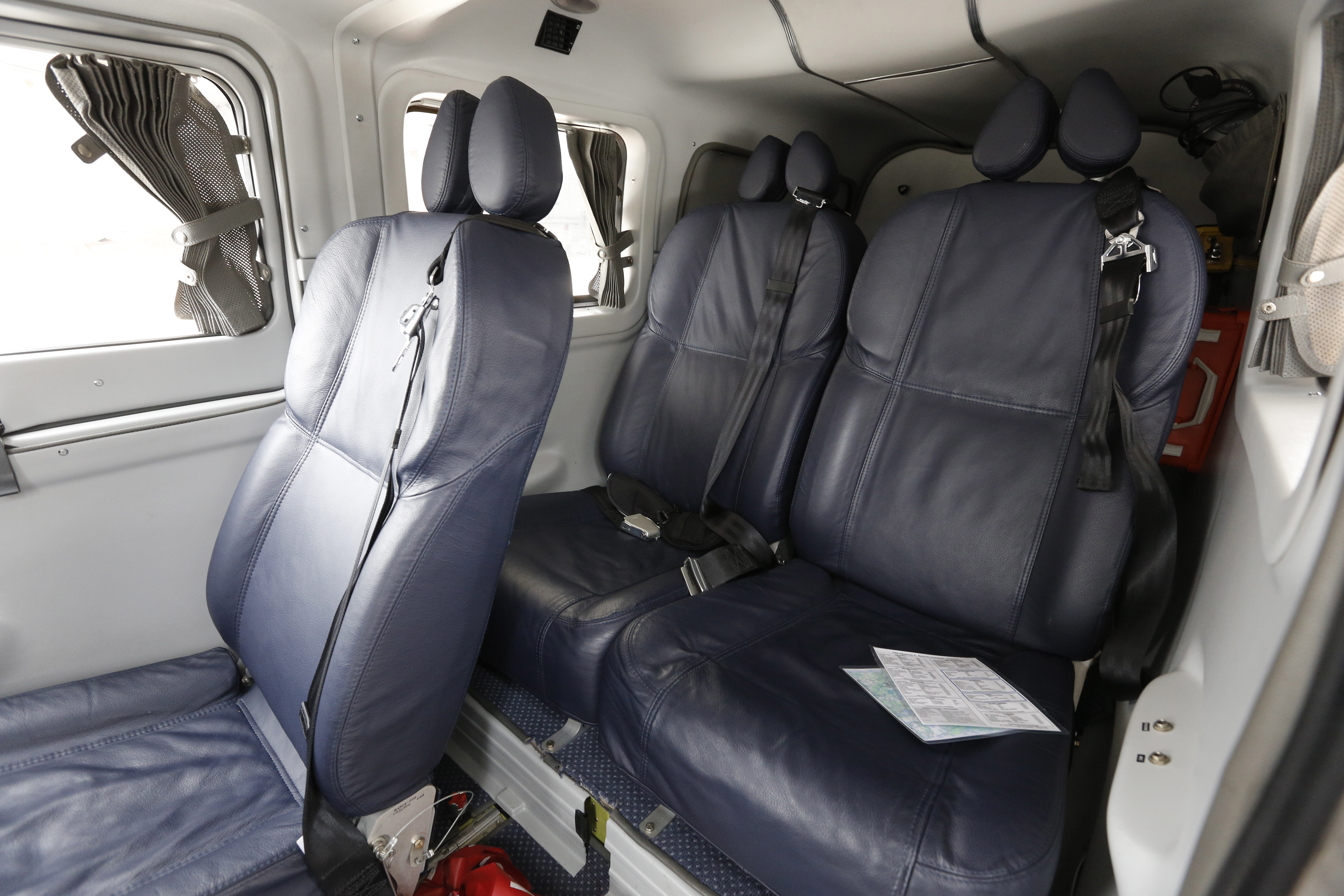
The P.68 cabin

Data from Vulcanair brochure

General characteristics

- Crew: one
- Capacity: plus five passengers
- Length: 31 ft 0 in (9.55 m)
- Wingspan: 39 ft 4 in (12 m)
- Height: 12 ft 3 in (3.40 m)
- Empty weight: 3,130 lb (1,420 kg)
- Max takeoff weight: 4,594 lb (2,084 kg)
- Fuel capacity: 177 US gal (147 imp gal; 670 L)
- Powerplant: 2 × Lycoming IO-360-A1B6 air-cooled horizontally-opposed engine, 200 hp (150 kW) each
- Propellers: 2-bladed

Performanceat sea level

- Cruise speed: 160 kn (187 mph, 301 km/h) at 10,000 ft (3,050 m) (econ cruise)
- Stall speed: 57 kn (66 mph, 106 km/h) (flaps down, power off)
- Range: 1,103 nmi (1,269 mi, 2,043 km) (econ cruise, standard fuel)
- Service ceiling: 18,000 ft (5,490 m)
- Rate of climb: 1,100 ft/min (6.0 m/s)

== See also ==
- Aero Commander 500 family
- Beechcraft Baron
- Britten-Norman BN-2 Islander
- Cessna 310
- Diamond DA62
- Piper PA-34 Seneca
