= Nordic Seaplanes =

Danish airline

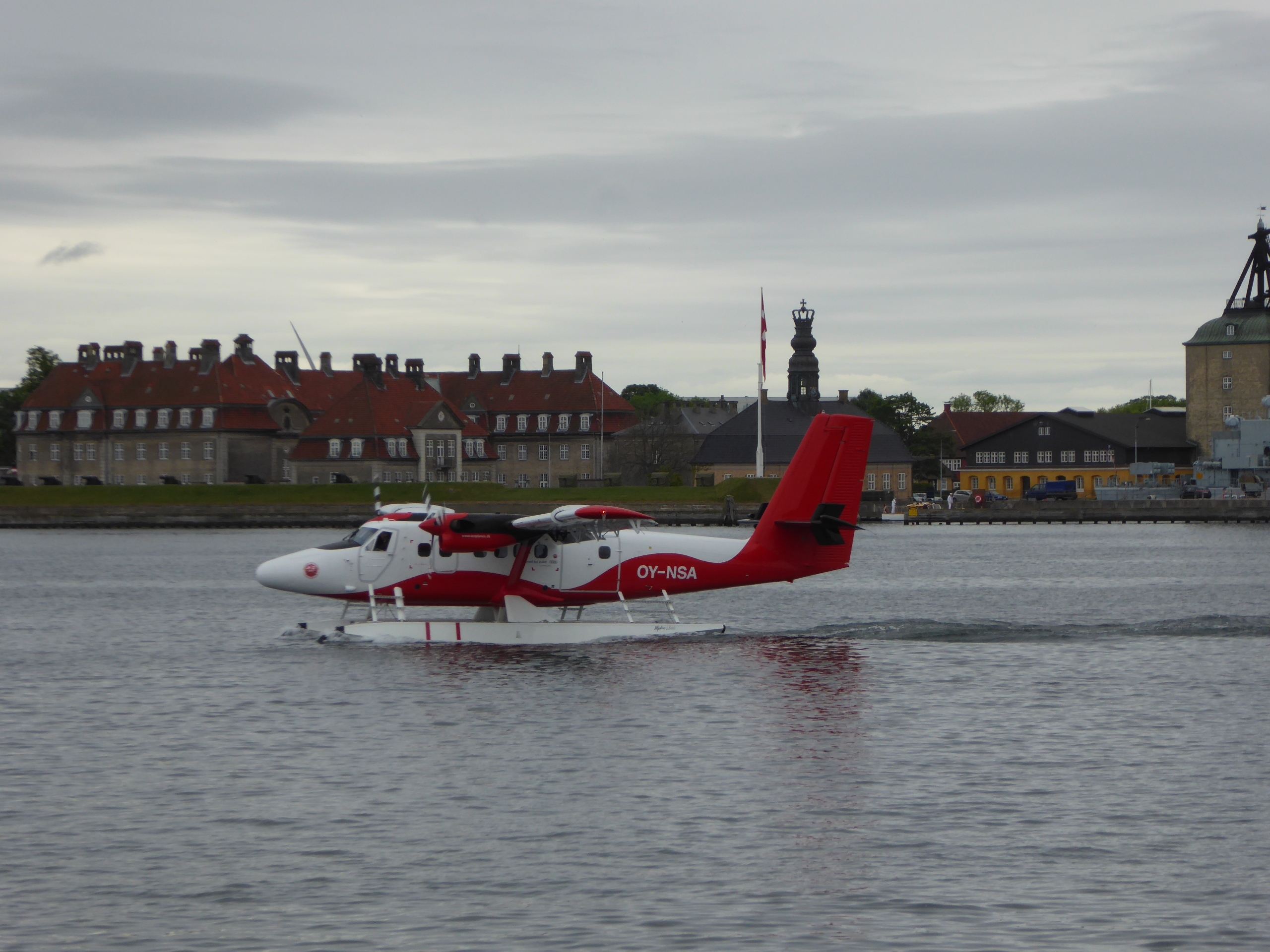
Floats-equipped DHC-6 Twin Otters in waters at Copenhagen

Nordic Seaplanes is a Danish airline which operates a scheduled daily passenger route by seaplane between the ports of Copenhagen and of Aarhus, Denmark. The company was established on June 19, 2015, and started schedules on May 25, 2016. The air carrier has suspended operations and it is not known when they will start again. The concern is said it is looking to electric-propelled aircraft when they will be available on the market.

== Destinations ==
The airline operate to following Habor and airports:

- port of Aarhus (ICAO:EKAC)
- port of Copenhagen (ICAO:EKCC)
- Læsø Airport (ICAO:EKLS)
- Aalborg (ICAO: EKYT)

== Fleet ==
- Two floats-equipped DHC-6 Twin Otters
