= Copenhagen AirTaxi =

Danish airline

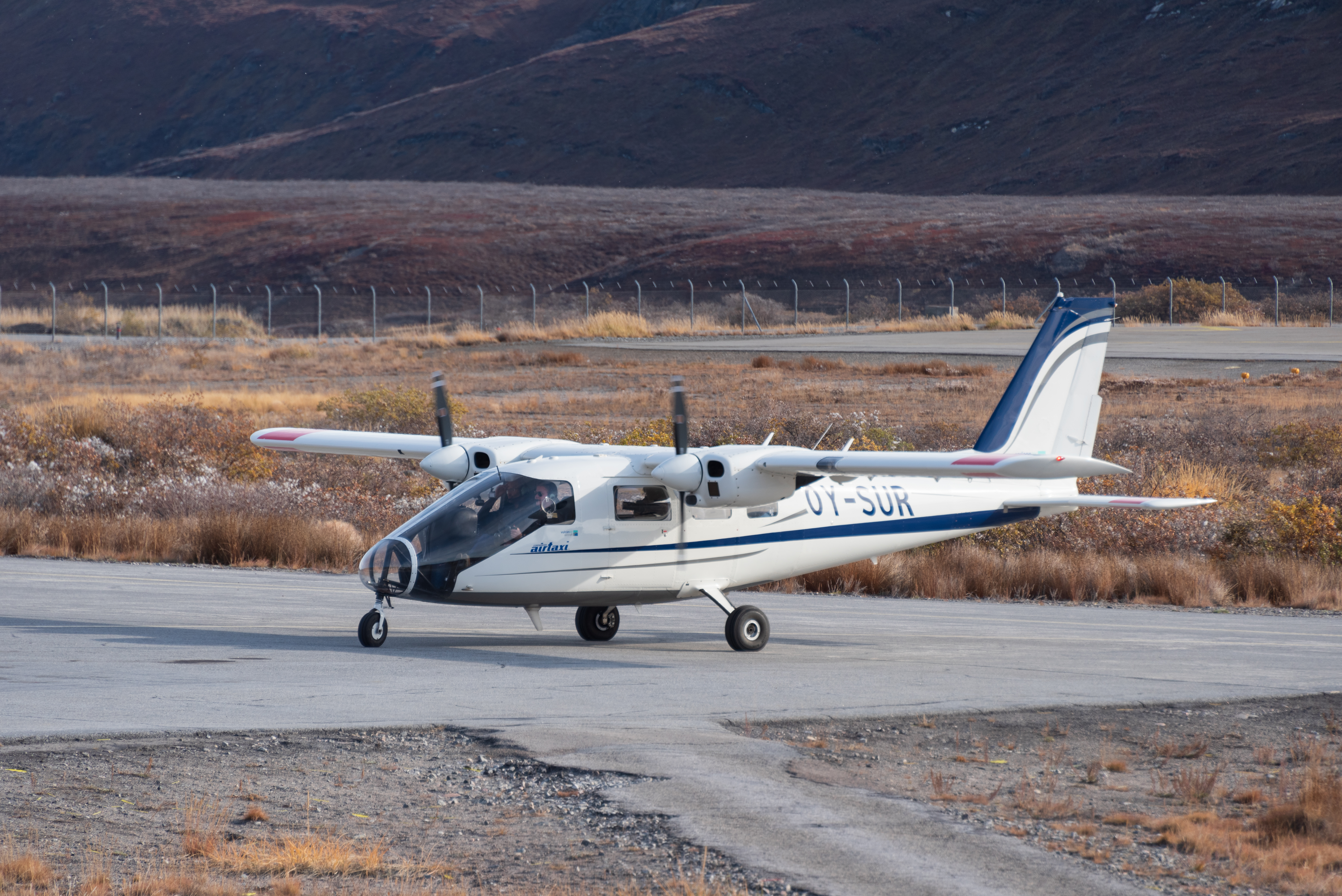
- Partenavia P68 Observer operating in association with AirZafari.
IATA	ICAO	Call sign
–	CAT	AIRCAT
- Founded: May 1963
- Fleet size: 19
- Destinations: Roskilde, Anholt, Læsø (+charter)
- Headquarters: Roskilde, Denmark
- Key people: Kenneth Arly Larsen
- Website: https://www.aircat.dk/

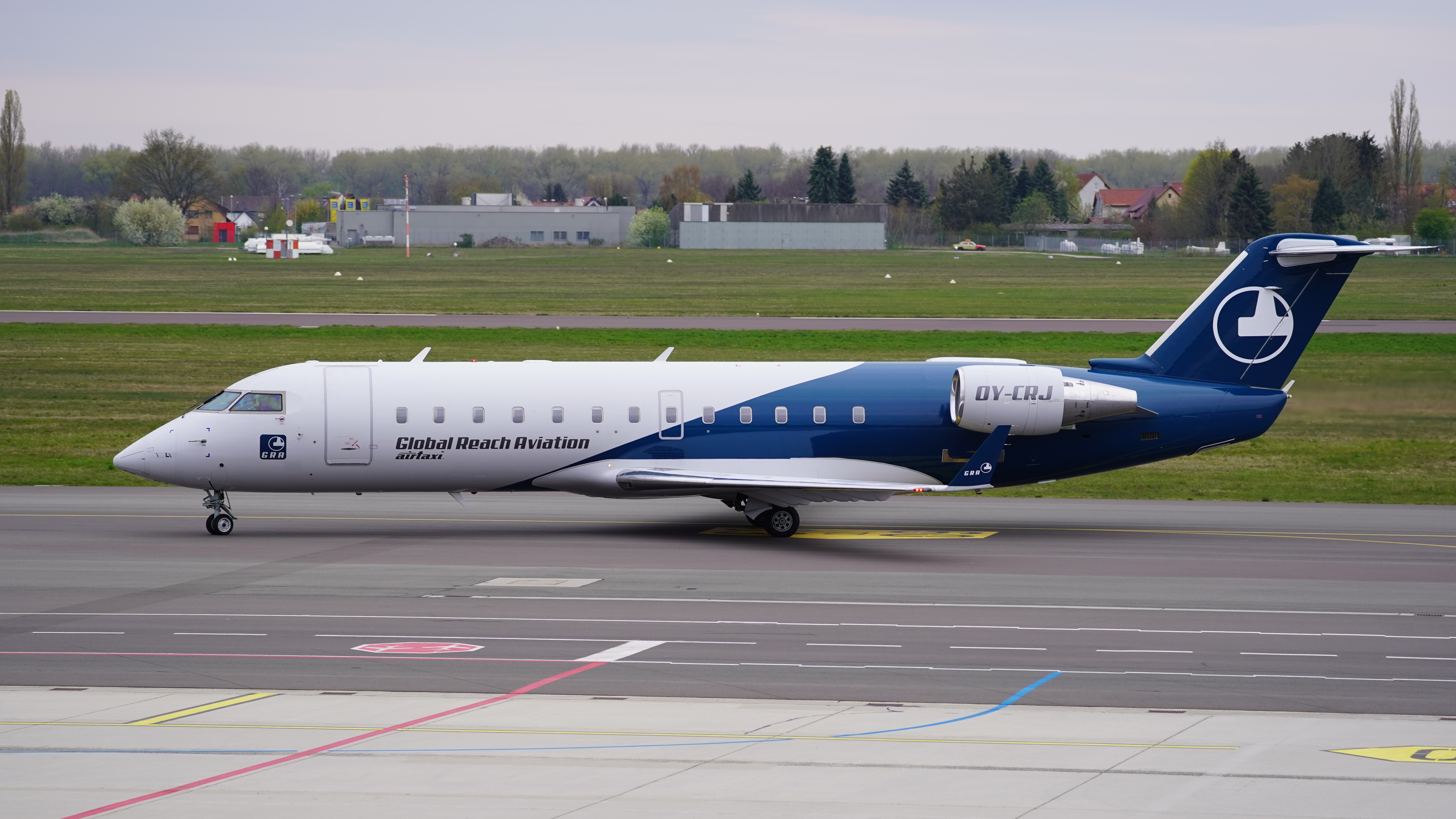
Bombardier CRJ-200LR

Copenhagen AirTaxi is an aviation company and flight school based in Roskilde, Denmark. It provides a range of services, including operating regularly scheduled flights from Copenhagen Airport, Roskilde (ICAO: EKRK) to the Danish islands of Anholt and Læsø; managing the airfield on Anholt, and is also a major airtaxi operator in Denmark, operating from EKRK. CAT is an experienced flight school with flight training leading to a private and commercial pilots license. With large modern facilities based in Roskilde, the school trains the future generation of professional pilots in Denmark. CAT also has a large maintenance facility specialized in General Aviation aircraft.

The company was a first-mover in Europe to introduce charter flights (airtaxi) on single engine turboprop aircraft under new legislation CAT SET-IMC. In 2017, CAT introduced the Pilatus PC-12 business aircraft to its fleet. The aircraft reaches destinations all over Europe, and have exceptional performance for short field operations.

The scheduled route between Roskilde – Anholt – Læsø is operated by a 10-seat Britten-Norman BN-2 Islander, but this may be substituted or augmented with one of the company's 6-seat Partenavia P.68's

In 2020 Copenhagen AirTaxi started operating a Boeing 737-800 on behalf of charter air carrier Air Seven and in their full colors.

== Fleet ==
For use by the resident flight school, airtaxi, scheduled flights or for rental purposes, the company has a fleet including:

Copenhagen AirTaxi's fleet
Aircraft	In operation	Passengers	Additional
Socata TB9 Tampico	4	3	Flight school, rental
Socata TB10 Tobago	2	4	Flight school, rental, sightseeing
Socata TB20 Trinidad	1	4	Flight school, rental, sightseeing
Cessna 172	1	3	Flight school, rental, sightseeing
Partenavia P68	5	5	Flight school, airtaxi, scheduled flights
Britten-Norman Islander BN2	2	9	Airtaxi, scheduled flights, sightseeing
Robinson 44	1	3	Flight school, sightseeing
Pilatus PC-12	4	8	Airtaxi
King Air 350I	1	9	Business flying
Boeing 737-800	4 (as of July 2026)	189	Charters, operated for Airseven
Total	23		

== Scheduled destinations ==
As of February 2025 CAT operates to:

- Roskilde (Copenhagen)
- Læsø
- Anholt

== AirZafari ==
AirZafari is a Greenlandic aviation company whose primary business is sightseeing-flying. The company was founded in 2011 and is operated on the AOC certificate of Copenhagen AirTaxi.
