= FlexFlight =

Danish charter airline

- Challenger 605
IATA	ICAO	Call sign
W2	FXT	Flexflight
- Founded: 2003
- Commenced operations: 2003
- Fleet size: 14
- Headquarters: Roskilde, Denmark
- Key people: Ran Piontek (founder)
- Website: flexflight.dk

FlexFlight is a Danish aircraft operator. It was founded in 2003 by Ran Piontek, Rasmus Wilsom and Christian Honoré in Roskilde, Denmark.

FlexFlight's primary business is aircraft management, and secondary business is worldwide air charter services. Also, FlexFlight partners with various airlines to sell their tickets on pre-existing and scheduled flights. The airline began in 2003 operating twice weekly Piper Chieftain services from Roskilde and Gothenburg City, to the Danish island Laesoe. Today the fleet range from light to heavy jets, as well as eight turboprops - covering worldwide charter and ambulance flights.

== Fleet ==
The FlexFlight fleet consists of the following aircraft (as of May 2023).

FlexFlight fleet
Aircraft	In service	Service
Bombardier Challenger 605	1	Charter
Bombardier Challenger 604	1	Charter & Air Ambulance
Cessna Citation M2	1	Charter
Hondajet Elite II	2	Charter
Pilatus PC-12	5	Charter & Air Ambulance
Cessna 172S Skyhawk SP	1	Schedueled flight and pleasure flight.
Total	13	
