= Roskilde Airport =

Secondary airport serving Copenhagen, Denmark

Copenhagen Airport, Roskilde Københavns Lufthavn, Roskilde

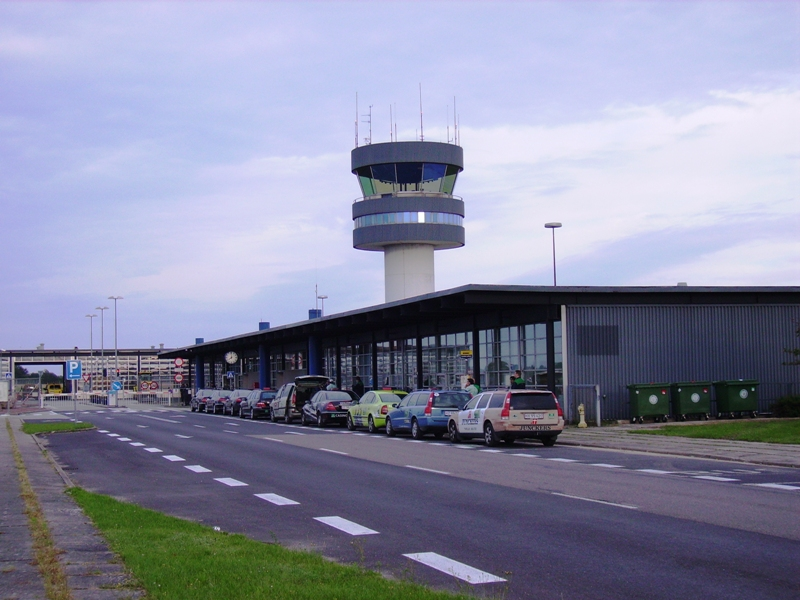
- IATA: RKE; ICAO: EKRK

Summary
- Airport type: Public
- Operator: Copenhagen Airports A/S
- Serves: Copenhagen metropolitan area and Metropolitan Malmö
- Location: Roskilde
- Opened: 1 April 1973; 53 years ago
- Elevation AMSL: 45 m (148 ft)
- Coordinates: 55°35′08″N 12°07′53″E
- Website: www.rke.dk

Map
- Location in Denmark

Runways
Direction	Length		Surface
Direction	m	ft	Surface
03/21	1,500	4,920	Asphalt
11/29	1,799	5,900	Asphalt

Copenhagen Airport, Roskilde (IATA: RKE, ICAO: EKRK) — simply known as Roskilde Airport — is located 4 nmi (7.4 km) southeast of Roskilde near the town Tune.

== History ==
It was opened in 1973 as the first of three planned relief airports around Copenhagen. These plans were shelved shortly after, and the two other relief airports never made it past the planning stage. The airport is owned and operated by Københavns Lufthavne A/S (Copenhagen Airports) which also operates Copenhagen's major airport at Kastrup. The airport had 25,053 passengers in 2003. The airport is fully equipped, but most flights from this airport are taxi-flights, small-plane regular flights to minor domestic islands or business jets.

It was once discussed to move all charter flights from Copenhagen Airport to this airport, but then the European aviation market changed as national airliners were allowed to be challenged by privately owned ones (1990s). The former charter airline companies in Europe then more or less had to either become regular challengers or vanish from the market. Hence, no flights with large aircraft have been moved to the airport. The runway is too short for fully loaded jet airliners such as the Boeing 737.

In 2002 the Ministry for Foreign Affairs Of Denmark reported that Ryanair was in discussions with the airport about beginning scheduled service to London Stansted. It was believed that the location fairly close to the centre of Copenhagen would attract the airline. The talks eventually came to nothing and Ryanair has not stated interest since. In October 2015, Ryanair instead started flights from the much larger and closer located Copenhagen Airport, which opened a low-cost terminal after Ryanair had used Malmö Airport for some years.

As of 2012, Roskilde Airport was planning an expansion of the runways and airport facilities to receive regular flights of low-cost international and charter operators, including aircraft types such as the Boeing 737 and the Airbus A320-family sizes. However, due to lack of commitment from airline carriers, these plans have been postponed until further notice.

== Overview ==
Operational facilities include:

- ILS approach for runways 11 and 21
- RNAV approach for runways 03 and 11
- Fuel: 100LL and Jet A1
- De-icing service
- Fire fighting category 5, 6 and 7 (on prior notice)
- Met office and ATIS
- Parking and hangar facilities
- Aircraft repairs and overhaul

The airport is open around the clock and has immigration and customs facilities for international traffic, but it is used primarily for taxi, business, and training flights and the airport serves as base for several flight schools. It is home to more than half of the Danish fleet of GA aircraft.

== Airlines and destinations ==
The following airlines operate regular scheduled and charter flights at the airport:

Airlines	Destinations
Copenhagen Air Taxi	Anholt, Læsø
Starling Air	Ærø, Ringsted, Svendborg

== Military operations ==
A small Danish Air Force installation is located adjacent to the airport, called Flyvestation Skalstrup. On the airport grounds there is additionally a separate area with a hangar and helipad, for use by the search and rescue Eskadrille 722, which deploys an AW101 Merlin rescue helicopter on permanent alert to cover the area of Sjælland and the Baltic Sea. This facility also covers any other Air Force deployment if needed. Roskilde is now the only airfield used by the armed forces on Sjælland with the closure of Værløse Air Base in 2004. Lately Roskilde Airport has been the departure airport of Danish troops deploying to or returning from overseas locations, primarily Afghanistan, due to its more private and secluded atmosphere, compared to the far busier Copenhagen Airport, Kastrup.

== Ground transportation ==
Bus and train services from around the country to the nearby town of Roskilde are extensive, but bus services to and from the airport are infrequent due to its limited use, and the primary means of getting to/from the airport is by own car or taxi. The road distance to the airport from Roskilde is 8 kilometres (5.0 mi) and from Copenhagen 40 kilometres (25 mi).

== See also ==
- List of the largest airports in the Nordic countries
