= List of Lycoming O-360 variants =

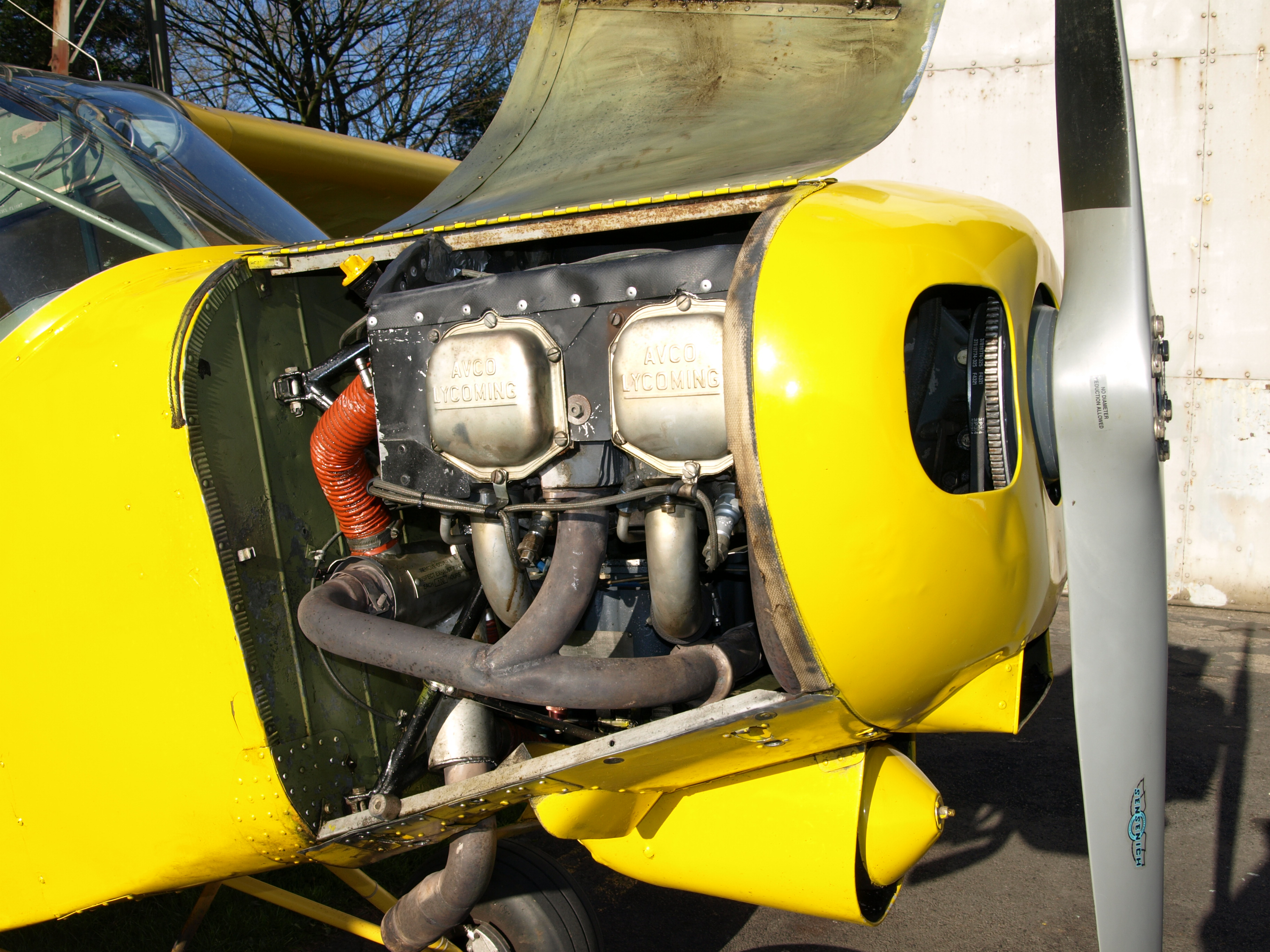
Lycoming O-360-A4A installed in a Piper PA-18

This is a list of the variants of the Lycoming O-360 aircraft engine. There are 167 different models within the O-360 family of engines, with 12 different prefixes.

== Variants ==
=== O-360 ===
O-360-A1A
180 hp (134 kW) at 2700 rpm, Minimum fuel grade 91/96 avgas, compression ratio 8.50:1. The base model. A four-cylinder, horizontally opposed, air-cooled, direct-drive engine which includes provisions for supplying oil through the propeller shaft for installation of a single-acting controllable-pitch propeller. First certified 20 July 1955.
O-360-A1AD
180 hp (134 kW) at 2700 rpm, Minimum fuel grade 91/96 avgas, compression ratio 8.50:1. Same as the A1A except it is equipped with a Bendix D4LN-2021 dual magneto instead of two single magnetos.
O-360-A1C
180 hp (134 kW) at 2700 rpm, Minimum fuel grade 91/96 avgas, compression ratio 8.50:1. Same as the A1A except with a rear-mounted Bendix carburetor and 200 series magnetos.
O-360-A1D
180 hp (134 kW) at 2700 rpm, Minimum fuel grade 91/96 avgas, compression ratio 8.50:1. Same as the A1A except with Bendix 200 series magnetos.
O-360-A1F
180 hp (134 kW) at 2700 rpm, Minimum fuel grade 91/96 avgas, compression ratio 8.50:1. Same as the A1A except with Bendix 1200 impulse coupling, high altitude magnetos.
O-360-A1F6
180 hp (134 kW) at 2700 rpm, Minimum fuel grade 91/96 avgas, compression ratio 8.50:1. Same as the A1F except with counter-weighted crankshaft.

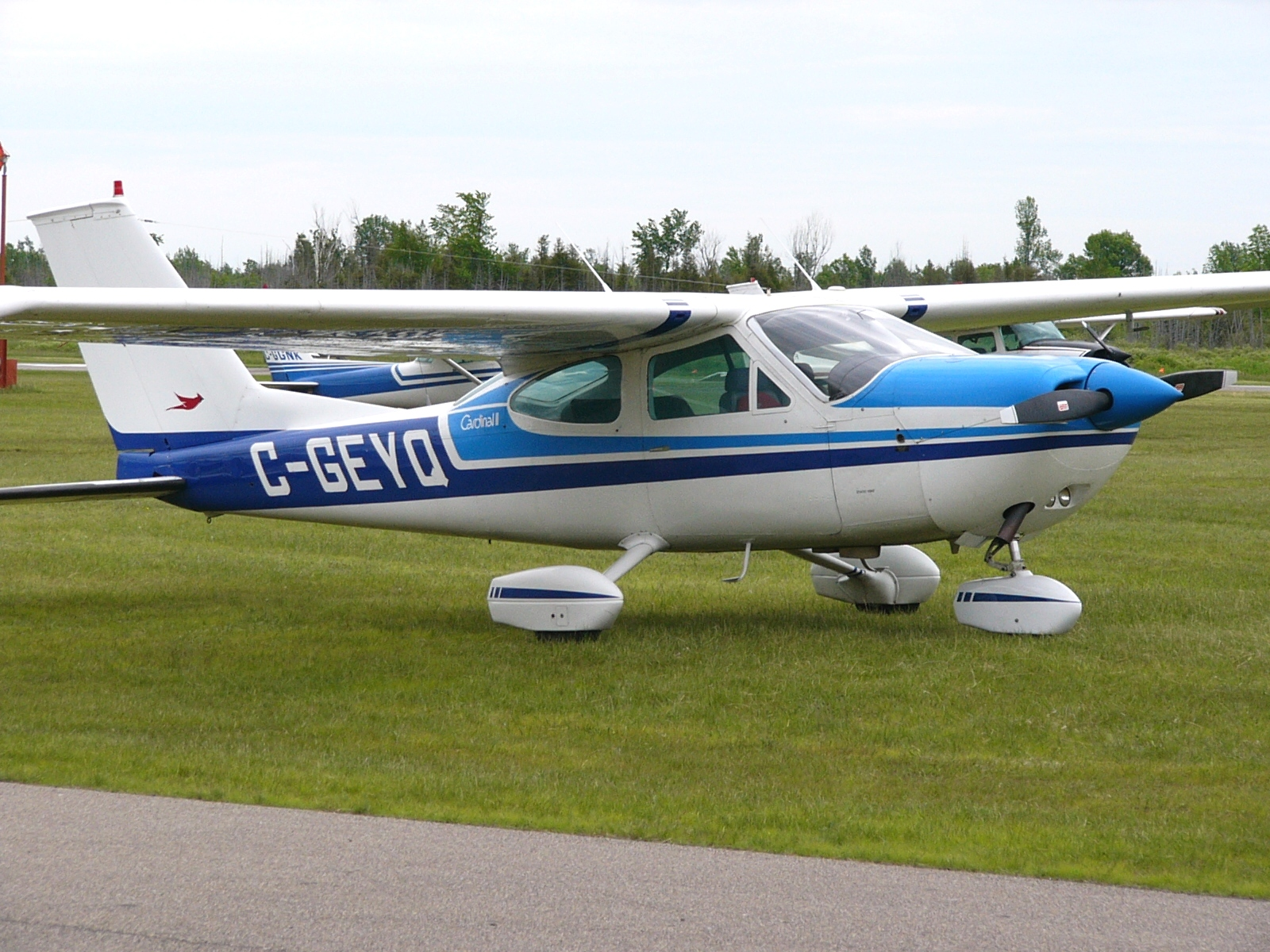
The Cessna 177B Cardinal uses a Lycoming O-360-A1F6D of 180 hp (130 kW).

O-360-A1F6D
180 hp (134 kW) at 2700 rpm, Minimum fuel grade 91/96 avgas, compression ratio 8.50:1. Same as the A1F6 except that it is equipped with one Bendix D4LN-2021 impulse coupling dual magneto instead of incorporating two single magneto.
O-360-A1G
180 hp (134 kW) at 2700 rpm, Minimum fuel grade 91/96 avgas, compression ratio 8.50:1. Same as the A1F except with a horizontal carburetor.
O-360-A1G6
180 hp (134 kW) at 2700 rpm, Minimum fuel grade 91/96 avgas, compression ratio 8.50:1. Same as the A1G except has a crankshaft that is equipped with counterweights.

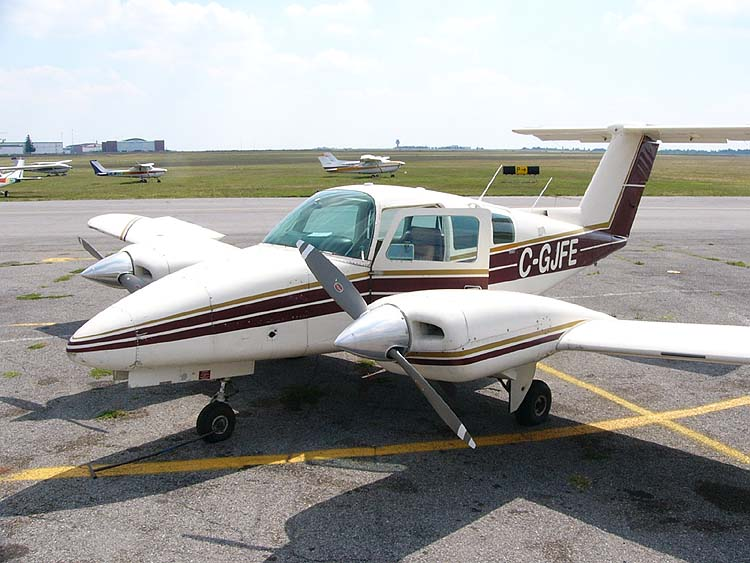
The Beechcraft Duchess uses one 180 hp (130 kW) O-360-A1G6D on the left wing and one LO-360-A1G6D on the right wing.

O-360-A1G6D
180 hp (134 kW) at 2700 rpm, Minimum fuel grade 91/96 avgas, compression ratio 8.50:1. Same as the A1G6 except that it is equipped with a Bendix D4LN-2021 magneto in place of two single magnetos.
O-360-A1H
180 hp (134 kW) at 2700 rpm, Minimum fuel grade 91/96 avgas, compression ratio 8.50:1. Same as the A1G except its crankcase has a propeller governor drive mounted on the left front instead of on the engine accessory housing.
O-360-A1H6
180 hp (134 kW) at 2700 rpm, Minimum fuel grade 91/96 avgas, compression ratio 8.50:1. Same as the A1H except that it has a crankshaft equipped with 6.3 and 8th order pendulum counterweights and it uses Slick magnetos.
O-360-A1LD
180 hp (134 kW) at 2700 rpm, Minimum fuel grade 91/96 avgas, compression ratio 8.50:1. Same as the A1A except that it is equipped with one Bendix D4LN-2021 impulse coupling dual magneto instead of two single magnetos.
O-360-A1P
180 hp (134 kW) at 2700 rpm, Minimum fuel grade 91/96 avgas, compression ratio 8.50:1. Same as the C1G except that it has dynafocal engine mounts.
O-360-A2A
180 hp (134 kW) at 2700 rpm, Minimum fuel grade 91/96 avgas, compression ratio 8.50:1. Same as the A1A except that it has no provisions for a controllable-pitch propeller.

O-360-A2D
180 hp (134 kW) at 2700 rpm, Minimum fuel grade 91/96 avgas, compression ratio 8.50:1. Same as the A1D except that it has no provisions for a controllable-pitch propeller.
O-360-A2E
180 hp (134 kW) at 2700 rpm, Minimum fuel grade 91/96 avgas, compression ratio 8.50:1. Same as the A2D but it is equipped with an AN-type fuel pump drive.
O-360-A2F
180 hp (134 kW) at 2700 rpm, Minimum fuel grade 91/96 avgas, compression ratio 8.50:1. Same as the A1F except has that it has no provisions for a controllable-pitch propeller.
O-360-A2G
180 hp (134 kW) at 2700 rpm, Minimum fuel grade 91/96 avgas, compression ratio 8.50:1. Same as the A1G but it has no provision for a controllable-pitch propeller.
O-360-A2H
180 hp (134 kW) at 2700 rpm, Minimum fuel grade 91/96 avgas, compression ratio 8.50:1. Same as the A1H except does not have propeller governor drive installed.

O-360-A3A
180 hp (134 kW) at 2700 rpm, Minimum fuel grade 91/96 avgas, compression ratio 8.50:1. Same as the A2A except that it has six special length bushings in propeller flange.
O-360-A3AD
180 hp (134 kW) at 2700 rpm, Minimum fuel grade 91/96 avgas, compression ratio 8.50:1. Same as the A3A except that it is equipped with a Bendix D4LN-2021 dual magneto instead of Bendix S4LN-21 and S4LN-20 magnetos.
O-360-A3D
180 hp (134 kW) at 2700 rpm, Minimum fuel grade 91/96 avgas, compression ratio 8.50:1. Same as the A2D except that it has special long propeller attaching bushings for use with Sensenich fixed-pitch propellers.

O-360-A4A
180 hp (134 kW) at 2700 rpm, Minimum fuel grade 91/96 avgas, compression ratio 8.50:1. Same as the A3A except has stiffer crankshaft.
O-360-A4AD
180 hp (134 kW) at 2700 rpm, Minimum fuel grade 91/96 avgas, compression ratio 8.50:1. Same as the A4A except is equipped with a Bendix D4LN-2021 impulse coupling dual magneto instead of two single magnetos.
O-360-A4D
180 hp (134 kW) at 2700 rpm, Minimum fuel grade 91/96 avgas, compression ratio 8.50:1. Same as the A4A except that it has a Bendix S4LN-200 retard breaker and S4LN-204 magnetos.
O-360-A4G
180 hp (134 kW) at 2700 rpm, Minimum fuel grade 91/96 avgas, compression ratio 8.50:1. Same as the A2G except that it has a stiffer crankshaft and solid main bearing journals.
O-360-A4J
180 hp (134 kW) at 2700 rpm, Minimum fuel grade 91/96 avgas, compression ratio 8.50:1. Same as the A4G except that it has different magnetos.
O-360-A4K
180 hp (134 kW) at 2700 rpm, Minimum fuel grade 91/96 avgas, compression ratio 8.50:1. Same as the A4J except that it has Slick 4051 and 4050 magnetos instead of Bendix S4LN-21 and S4LN-204 magnetos.
O-360-A4M
180 hp (134 kW) at 2700 rpm, Minimum fuel grade 91/96 avgas, compression ratio 8.50:1. Same as the A4A but with Slick 4051 and 4050 magnetos instead of Bendix S4LN-21 and S4LN-204 magnetos.
O-360-A4N
180 hp (134 kW) at 2700 rpm, Minimum fuel grade 91/96 avgas, compression ratio 8.50:1. Same as the A4M except that it has a non-machined propeller governor pad on left front of crankcase.
O-360-A4P
180 hp (134 kW) at 2700 rpm, Minimum fuel grade 91/96 avgas, compression ratio 8.50:1. Same as the A4M except that it has short propeller flange bushings.
O-360-A5AD
180 hp (134 kW) at 2700 rpm, Minimum fuel grade 91/96 avgas, compression ratio 8.50:1. Same as the A4AD except that it has six standard length propeller flange bushings instead of six special length bushings.

O-360-B1A
168 hp (125 kW) at 2700 rpm, Minimum fuel grade 80/87 avgas, compression ratio 7.20:1. Same as the A1A except that it has a lower compression ratio and power rating.
O-360-B1B
168 hp (125 kW) at 2700 rpm, Minimum fuel grade 80/87 avgas, compression ratio 7.20:1. Same as the B1A except has Bendix 200 series magnetos.
O-360-B2A
168 hp (125 kW) at 2700 rpm, Minimum fuel grade 80/87 avgas, compression ratio 7.20:1. Same as the B1A except has no provisions for controllable-pitch propeller.
O-360-B2B
168 hp (125 kW) at 2700 rpm, Minimum fuel grade 80/87 avgas, compression ratio 7.20:1. Same as the B1B except that it has no provisions for controllable-pitch propeller.
O-360-B2C
168 hp (125 kW) at 2700 rpm, Minimum fuel grade 80/87 avgas, compression ratio 7.20:1. Same as the B2A except that it has heavier IO-360-A crankshaft and rods.

O-360-C1A
180 hp (134 kW) at 2700 rpm, Minimum fuel grade 91/96 avgas, compression ratio 8.50:1. Same as the A1A except that it has its crankcase machined for conical rubber mount bushings in place of dynafocal mountings.
O-360-C1C
180 hp (134 kW) at 2700 rpm, Minimum fuel grade 91/96 avgas, compression ratio 8.50:1. Same as the C1A except with Bendix 200 series magnetos.
O-360-C1E
180 hp (134 kW) at 2700 rpm, Minimum fuel grade 91/96 avgas, compression ratio 8.50:1. Same as the C1A except that it is equipped with Slick 4051 and 4050 magnetos instead of Bendix S4LN-21 and S4LN-204 magnetos.
O-360-C1F
180 hp (134 kW) at 2700 rpm, Minimum fuel grade 91/96 avgas, compression ratio 8.50:1. Same as the A1G except that it has Slick 4050 and 4051 magnetos and a rear-type engine mounting instead of dynafocal type mount.
O-360-C1G
180 hp (134 kW) at 2700 rpm, Minimum fuel grade 91/96 avgas, compression ratio 8.50:1. Same as the C1A except that the propeller governor drive is located on the left-front of the crankcase, the same as on the O-360-A1H.
O-360-C2A
180 hp (134 kW) at 2700 rpm, Minimum fuel grade 91/96 avgas, compression ratio 8.50:1. Same as the C1A except that it has no provision for controllable-pitch propeller.
O-360-C2B
180 hp (134 kW) at 2700 rpm, Minimum fuel grade 91/96 avgas, compression ratio 8.50:1. Same as the C2A except that it has a rear-mounted Bendix carburetor.
O-360-C2C
180 hp (134 kW) at 2700 rpm, Minimum fuel grade 91/96 avgas, compression ratio 8.50:1. Same as the C2A except that it has Bendix 200 series magnetos.
O-360-C2D
180 hp (134 kW) at 2900 rpm, Minimum fuel grade 91/96 avgas, compression ratio 8.50:1. Same as the C2B except has Bendix 200 series magnetos. First certified.
O-360-C2E
180 hp (134 kW) at 2700 rpm, Minimum fuel grade 91/96 avgas, compression ratio 8.50:1. Same as the C2A except that it is equipped with Slick 4051 and 4050 magnetos instead of Bendix S4LN-21 and S4LN-20 magnetos.
O-360-C4F
180 hp (134 kW) at 2700 rpm, Minimum fuel grade 91/96 avgas, compression ratio 8.50:1. Same as the C1F except has a solid crankshaft and no provision for a prop governor.
O-360-C4P
180 hp (134 kW) at 2700 rpm, Minimum fuel grade 91/96 avgas, compression ratio 8.50:1. Same as the A4M except has short propeller flange bushings and conical engine mounts.

O-360-D1A
168 hp (125 kW) at 2700 rpm, Minimum fuel grade 80/87 avgas, compression ratio 7.20:1. Same as the B1A except that it has a crankcase machined for conical rubber mount bushings in place of dynafocal mountings.
O-360-D2A
168 hp (125 kW) at 2700 rpm, Minimum fuel grade 80/87 avgas, compression ratio 7.20:1. Same as the B2A except that it has a crankcase machined for conical rubber mount bushings in place of dynafocal mountings.
O-360-D2B
168 hp (125 kW) at 2700 rpm, Minimum fuel grade 80/87 avgas, compression ratio 7.20:1. Same as the D2A except has Bendix 200 series magnetos.

O-360-E1AD
180 hp (134 kW) at 2700 rpm, Minimum fuel grade 100 or 100LL avgas, compression ratio 9.00:1. Similar to the A1A except that it has a crankcase with an integral accessory section, front-mounted fuel pump, external mounted oil pump, automatic valve tappets and rocker arms and also a dual magneto.
O-360-E1A6D
180 hp (134 kW) at 2700 rpm, Minimum fuel grade 100 or 100LL avgas, compression ratio 9.00:1. same as the E1AD except that it is equipped with one 6.3 order and one 8th order counterweight.
O-360-E2AD
180 hp (134 kW) at 2700 rpm, Minimum fuel grade 100 or 100LL avgas, compression ratio 9.00:1. Similar to the E1AD except without provision for controllable-pitch propeller.
O-360-E1BD
180 hp (134 kW) at 2700 rpm, Minimum fuel grade 100 or 100LL avgas, compression ratio 9.00:1. Similar to the E1AD except with Bendix D4RN-2200 retard breaker magnetos in place of the Bendix D4RN-2021 impulse coupling magneto.
O-360-E2BD
180 hp (134 kW) at 2700 rpm, Minimum fuel grade 100 or 100LL avgas, compression ratio 9.00:1. Similar to the E1BD except without provision for controllable-pitch propeller.
O-360-F1A6
180 hp (134 kW) at 2700 rpm, Minimum fuel grade 91/96 avgas, compression ratio 8.50:1. Same as the A1G6 except that it has two Slick 4191 magnetos, a propeller governor drive on the crankcase left front and oil sump designed for retracted nose wheel clearance.
O-360-G1A6
180 hp (134 kW) at 2700 rpm, Minimum fuel grade 91/96 avgas, compression ratio 8.50:1. Same as the F1A6 except that it has a machined pad on the right front of the crankcase for installation equipment.

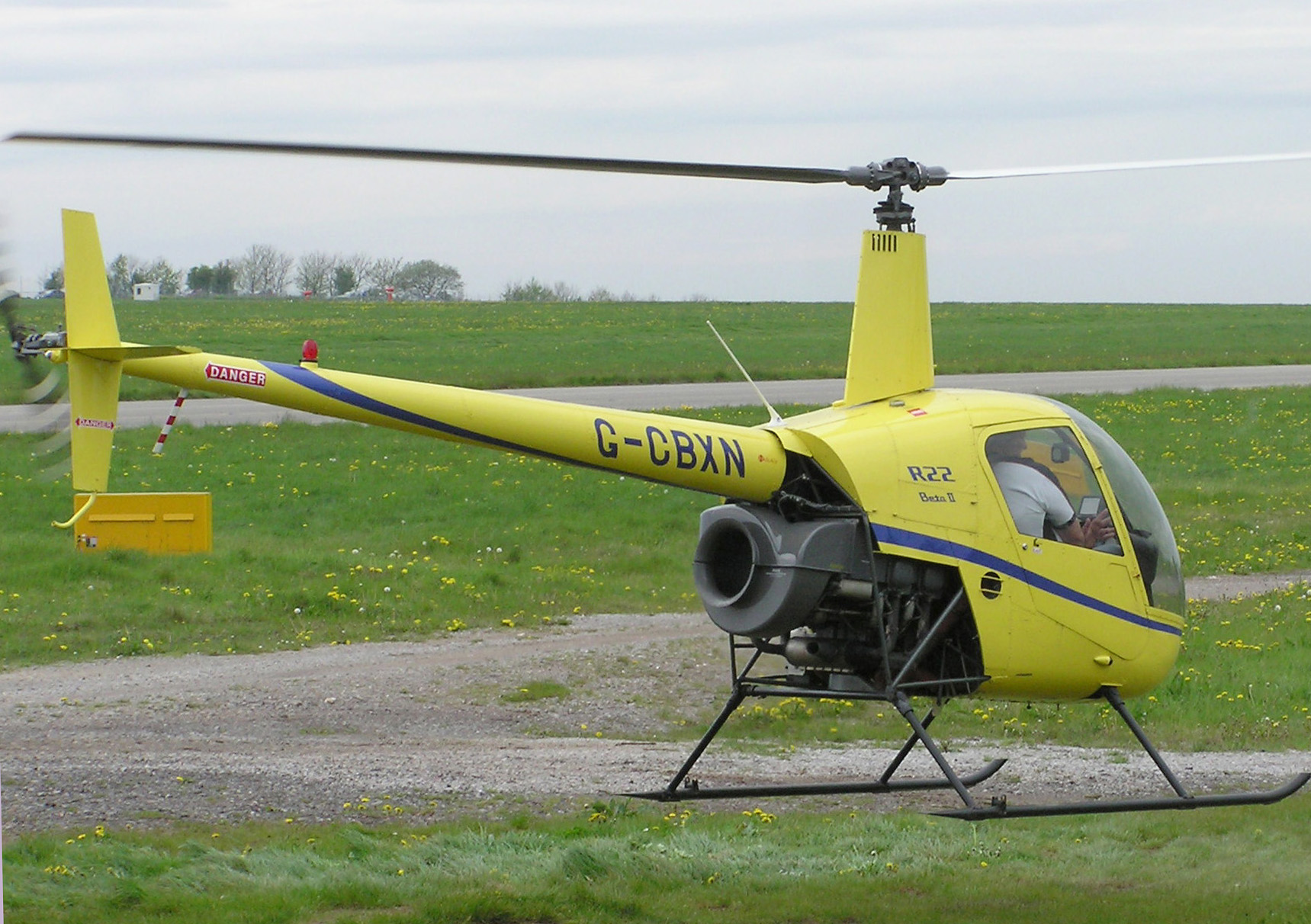
Robinson R22 Beta II with Lycoming O-360-J2A engine.

O-360-J2A
145 hp (108 kW) at 2700 rpm, Minimum fuel grade 91/96 avgas, compression ratio 8.50:1. Same as the C1C except has O-320-B2C prop flange bushings, lightweight cylinders and lower power rating for helicopter use. This engine is used in the Robinson R22 helicopter.

=== HO-360 ===
HO-360-A1A
180 hp (134 kW) at 2900 rpm, Minimum fuel grade 91/96 avgas, compression ratio 8.50:1. Same as the A1D but with dynafocal mounts and a different series Marvel carburetor.
HO-360-B1A
180 hp (134 kW) at 2900 rpm, Minimum fuel grade 91/96 avgas, compression ratio 8.50:1. Same as C2D but with a different cam shaft.
HO-360-B1B
180 hp (134 kW) at 2900 rpm, Minimum fuel grade 91/96 avgas, compression ratio 8.50:1. Same as the B1A but with Bendix 200 series retard breaker magnetos.
HO-360-C1A
180 hp (134 kW) at 2900 rpm, Minimum fuel grade 91/96 avgas, compression ratio 8.50:1. Same as the C2D except that it uses an HA-6 carburetor in place of the PSH-5HD carburetor.

=== LO-360 ===
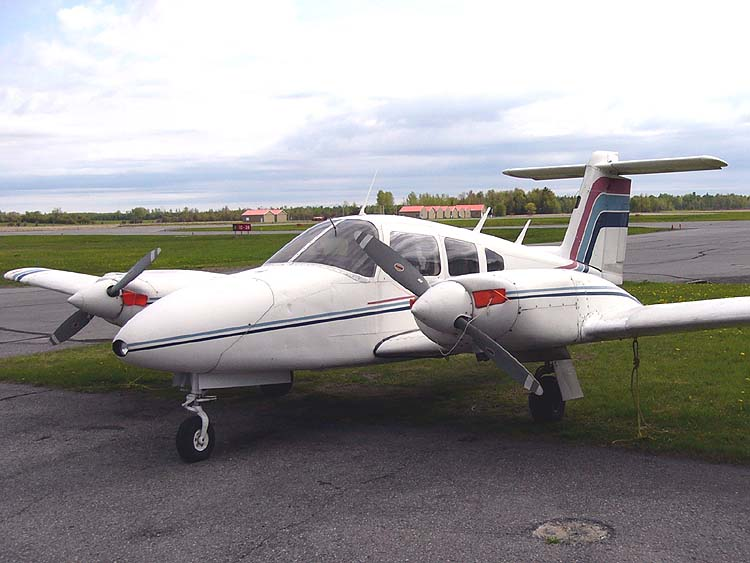
The Piper PA-44 Seminole is fitted with one LO-360-E1A6D or one LO-360-A1H6 on the right wing along with one O-360-E1A6D or O-360-A1H6 on the left wing to eliminate the critical engine on this twin.

LO-360-A1G6D
180 hp (134 kW) at 2700 rpm, Minimum fuel grade 91/96 avgas, compression ratio 8.50:1. Same as the A1G6D except that it has counter-clockwise (reverse) rotation.
LO-360-A1H6
180 hp (134 kW) at 2700 rpm, Minimum fuel grade 91/96 avgas, compression ratio 8.50:1. Same as the A1H except that it has counter-clockwise (reverse) rotation.
LO-360-E1AD
180 hp (134 kW) at 2700 rpm, Minimum fuel grade 100 or 100LL avgas, compression ratio 9.00:1. Similar to the E1AD except has counter-clockwise (reverse) rotation.
LO-360-E1A6D
180 hp (134 kW) at 2700 rpm, Minimum fuel grade 100 or 100LL avgas, compression ratio 9.00:1. Similar to the E1A6D except has counter-clockwise (reverse) rotation.
LO-360-E2AD
180 hp (134 kW) at 2700 rpm, Minimum fuel grade 100 or 100LL avgas, compression ratio 9.00:1. Similar to the E2AD except has counter-clockwise (reverse) rotation.
LO-360-E1BD
180 hp (134 kW) at 2700 rpm, Minimum fuel grade 100 or 100LL avgas, compression ratio 9.00:1. Similar to the E1BD except has counter-clockwise (reverse) rotation.
LO-360-E2BD
180 hp (134 kW) at 2700 rpm, Minimum fuel grade 100 or 100LL avgas, compression ratio 9.00:1. Similar to the E2AD except has counter-clockwise (reverse) rotation.

=== TO-360 ===
TO-360-A1A6D
200 hp (149 kW) at 2575 rpm, Minimum fuel grade 100 or 100LL avgas, compression ratio 8.00:1. Turbosupercharger: Rajay 301E10-2. Base model, a four-cylinder air-cooled, horizontally opposed, direct drive, carbureted, turbocharged engine with oil jets internal piston cooling.
TO-360-C1A6D
210 hp (157 kW) at 2575 rpm, Minimum fuel grade 100 or 100LL avgas, compression ratio 7.30:1. Turbosupercharger: Rajay 301E10-2. Same as the TO-360-A1A6D but with the power output increased, lower compression ratio and carburetor located after the turbocharger instead of before the turbocharger.
TO-360-E1A6D
180 hp (134 kW) at 2575 rpm, Minimum fuel grade 100 or 100LL avgas, compression ratio 8.00:1. Turbosupercharger: AiResearch TA04. Same as the 0-360-E1A6D but with an AiResearch TA402 turbocharger, 8.00:1 compression ratio pistons, piston cooling oil jets and a high pressure fuel pump.
TO-360-F1A6D
210 hp (157 kW) at 2575 rpm, Minimum fuel grade 100 or 100LL avgas, compression ratio 7.30:1. Turbosupercharger: Rajay 301E10-2. Same as the TO-360-C1A6D but with rear type mounting (long type 1.12 inch conical mount).

=== LTO-360 ===
LTO-360-A1A6D
200 hp (149 kW) at 2575 rpm, Minimum fuel grade 100 or 100LL avgas, compression ratio 8.00:1. Turbosupercharger: Rajay 301E10-2. Same as the TO-360-A1A6D But with counter-clockwise (reverse) rotation.
LTO-360-E1A6D
180 hp (134 kW) at 2575 rpm, Minimum fuel grade 100 or 100LL avgas, compression ratio 8.00:1. Turbosupercharger: AiResearch TA04. Same as the TO-360-E1A6D But with counter-clockwise (reverse) rotation.

=== IO-360 ===
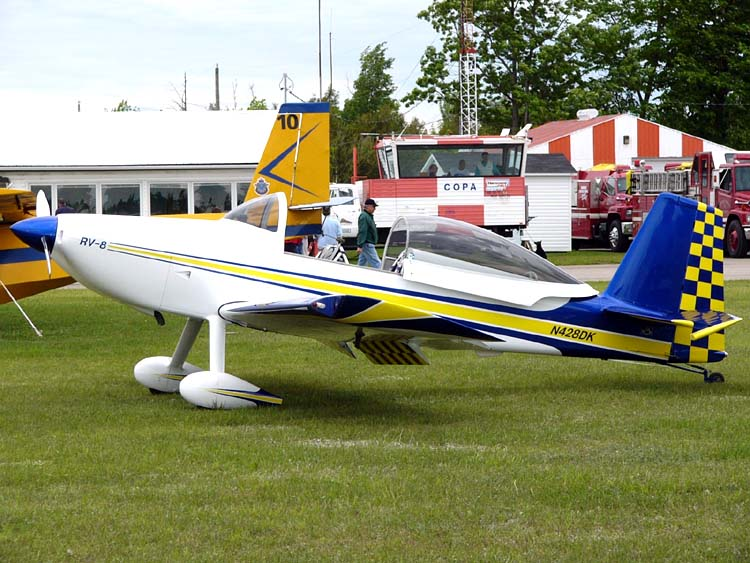
The Van's Aircraft RV-8 homebuilt aircraft is often fitted with a 200 hp IO-360 engine.

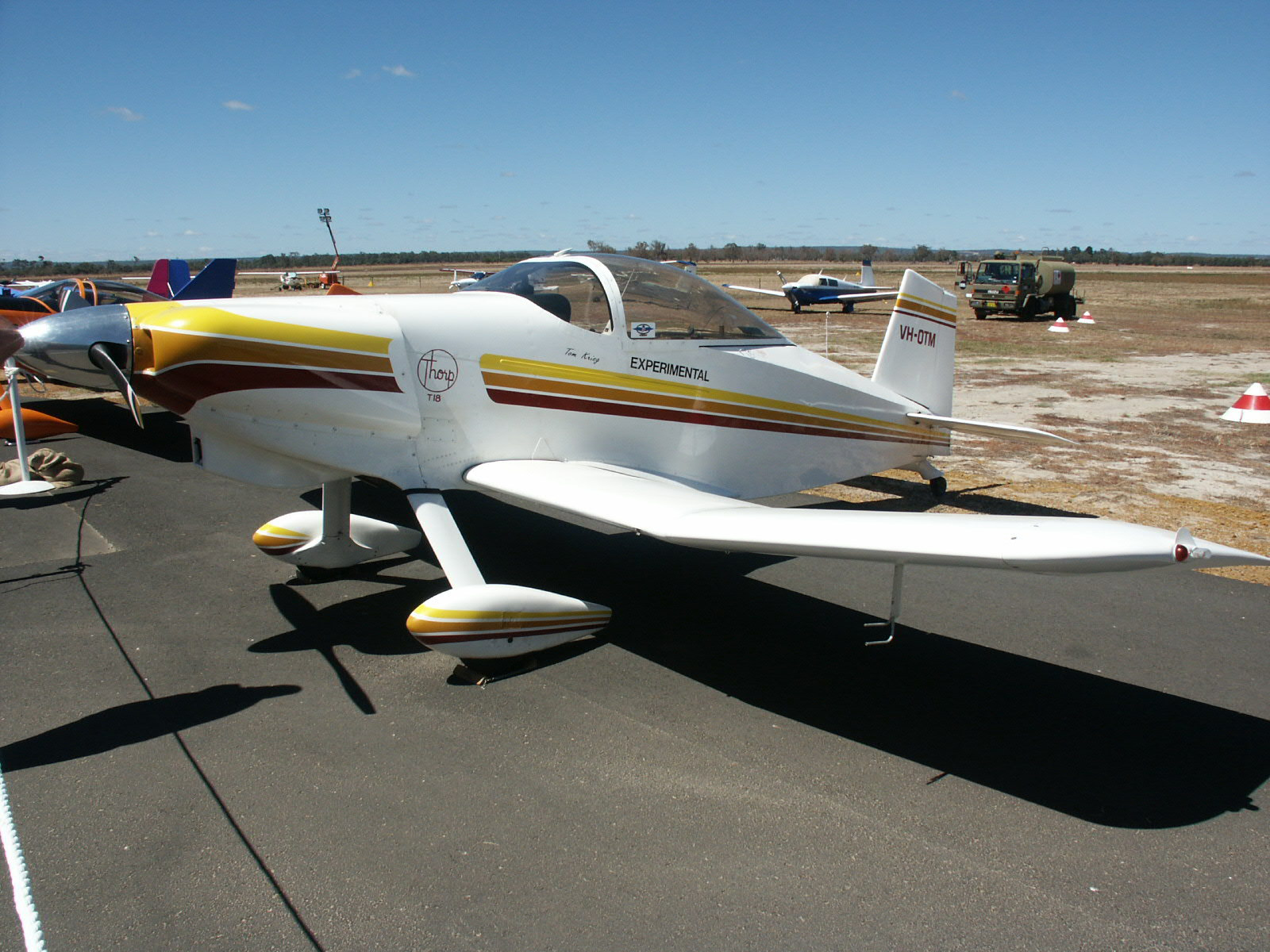
The largest engine that is normally fitted to the Thorp T-18 homebuilt aircraft is the 200 hp IO-360 engine.

IO-360-A1A
200 hp (149 kW) at 2700 rpm, Minimum fuel grade 100 or 100LL avgas, compression ratio 8.70:1. The base fuel-injected model, a four-cylinder air-cooled, horizontally opposed, direct-drive, fuel-injected, tuned induction engine with oil jet internal piston cooling. It includes provision for single-action controllable-pitch propeller.

IO-360-A1B
200 hp (149 kW) at 2700 rpm, Minimum fuel grade 100 or 100LL avgas, compression ratio 8.70:1. Same as the A1A but with impulse coupling magnetos.
IO-360-A1B6
200 hp (149 kW) at 2700 rpm, Minimum fuel grade 100 or 100LL avgas, compression ratio 8.70:1. Same as the A1B but with a crankshaft that has one 6.3 order and one 8th order counterweights.
IO-360-A1B6D
200 hp (149 kW) at 2700 rpm, Minimum fuel grade 100 or 100LL avgas, compression ratio 8.70:1. Same as the A1B6 but with Bendix Series impulse coupling dual magnetos instead of two S-1200 Series magnetos.
IO-360-A1C
200 hp (149 kW) at 2700 rpm, Minimum fuel grade 100 or 100LL avgas, compression ratio 8.70:1. Same as the A1A but with Bendix S-1200 series high altitude magnetos.
IO-360-A1D
200 hp (149 kW) at 2700 rpm, Minimum fuel grade 100 or 100LL avgas, compression ratio 8.70:1. Same as the A1B but with one S-20 series impulse coupling and one S-200 series magnetos in place of the two S-1200 series magnetos.
IO-360-A1D6
200 hp (149 kW) at 2700 rpm, Minimum fuel grade 100 or 100LL avgas, compression ratio 8.70:1. Same as the A1B but with a propeller governor drive located on left front of crankcase in place of on the accessory housing. Incorporates crankshaft equipped with one 6.3 order and one 8th order counterweights.
IO-360-A1D6D
200 hp (149 kW) at 2700 rpm, Minimum fuel grade 100 or 100LL avgas, compression ratio 8.70:1. Same as the A1D6 but with a Bendix D4LN-3021 dual magneto.

IO-360-A2A
200 hp (149 kW) at 2700 rpm, Minimum fuel grade 100 or 100LL avgas, compression ratio 8.70:1. Same as the A1A but with a modified crankshaft to accept a fixed-pitch propeller.
IO-360-A2B
200 hp (149 kW) at 2700 rpm, Minimum fuel grade 100 or 100LL avgas, compression ratio 8.70:1. Same as the A2A but with impulse coupling magnetos.
IO-360-A2C
200 hp (149 kW) at 2700 rpm, Minimum fuel grade 100 or 100LL avgas, compression ratio 8.70:1. Same as the A2A but with Bendix S-1200 series high altitude magnetos.
IO-360-A3B6
200 hp (149 kW) at 2700 rpm, Minimum fuel grade 100 or 100LL avgas, compression ratio 8.70:1. Same as the A1B6D but with the propeller locating bushings rotated 120° clockwise.
IO-360-A3B6D
200 hp (149 kW) at 2700 rpm, Minimum fuel grade 100 or 100LL avgas, compression ratio 8.70:1. Same as the A1B6D but with the propeller locating bushings rotated 120° clockwise.
IO-360-A3D6D
200 hp (149 kW) at 2700 rpm, Minimum fuel grade 100 or 100LL avgas, compression ratio 8.70:1. Same as the A1D6D but with the propeller locating bushings rotated 120° clockwise.

IO-360-B1A
180 hp (134 kW) at 2700 rpm, Minimum fuel grade 91/96 avgas, compression ratio 8.50:1. Same as the A1A but with a Simmonds Type 530 fuel injector and without a tuned induction system.
IO-360-B1B
180 hp (134 kW) at 2700 rpm, Minimum fuel grade 91/96 avgas, compression ratio 8.50:1. Same as the B1A but with a Bendix RSA-5AD1 injector. Fuel pressure limit at inlet to diaphragm pump.
IO-360-B1C
177 hp (132 kW) at 2700 rpm, Minimum fuel grade 91/96 avgas, compression ratio 8.50:1. Same as the HIO-360-B1B externally but with a crankcase machined for No. 1 Dynafocal mounts.
IO-360-B1D
180 hp (134 kW) at 2700 rpm, Minimum fuel grade 91/96 avgas, compression ratio 8.50:1. Same as the B1B but with an AN fuel pump drive. Fuel pressure to diaphragm pump does not apply.
IO-360-B1E
180 hp (134 kW) at 2700 rpm, Minimum fuel grade 91/96 avgas, compression ratio 8.50:1. Same as the B1B except the oil sumps, induction manifolding and alternate magnetos.
IO-360-B1F
180 hp (134 kW) at 2700 rpm, Minimum fuel grade 91/96 avgas, compression ratio 8.50:1. Same as the B1B but with Bendix S 1200 series high altitude magnetos.
IO-360-B1F6
180 hp (134 kW) at 2700 rpm, Minimum fuel grade 91/96 avgas, compression ratio 8.50:1. Same as the B1F but with a crankshaft that has one 6.3 and one 8th order counterweights.
IO-360-B1G6
180 hp (134 kW) at 2700 rpm, Minimum fuel grade 91/96 avgas, compression ratio 8.50:1. Same as the B1E but with a front-mounted governor, provision for bed mounting and a counterweighted crankshaft.

IO-360-B2E
180 hp (134 kW) at 2700 rpm, Minimum fuel grade 91/96 avgas, compression ratio 8.50:1. Same as the B1F but without provisions for a controllable-pitch propeller.
IO-360-B2F
180 hp (134 kW) at 2700 rpm, Minimum fuel grade 91/96 avgas, compression ratio 8.50:1. Same as the B1F but with different front crankshaft oil plug, for fixed-pitch propeller.
IO-360-B2F6
180 hp (134 kW) at 2700 rpm, Minimum fuel grade 91/96 avgas, compression ratio 8.50:1. Same as the B2F but with a crankshaft with one 6.3 and one 8th order counterweights.
IO-360-B4A
180 hp (134 kW) at 2700 rpm, Minimum fuel grade 91/96 avgas, compression ratio 8.50:1. Same as the B1B but has different magnetos and a stiffer crankshaft and solid main bearing journals.
IO-360-C1A
200 hp (149 kW) at 2700 rpm, Minimum fuel grade 100 or 100LL avgas, compression ratio 8.70:1. Same as the A1A but with a rear-mounted injector.

IO-360-C1B
200 hp (149 kW) at 2700 rpm, Minimum fuel grade 100 or 100LL avgas, compression ratio 8.70:1. Same as the C1A but with Bendix 1200 series magnetos.
IO-360-C1C
200 hp (149 kW) at 2700 rpm, Minimum fuel grade 100 or 100LL avgas, compression ratio 8.70:1. Same as the C1B but with a 14-degree fuel injector inlet adapter and an impulse coupling Bendix S4LN-1227 magneto.
IO-360-C1C6
200 hp (149 kW) at 2700 rpm, Minimum fuel grade 100 or 100LL avgas, compression ratio 8.70:1. Same as the C1C but with a crankshaft with one 6.3 order and one 8th order counterweights.
IO-360-C1D6
200 hp (149 kW) at 2700 rpm, Minimum fuel grade 100 or 100LL avgas, compression ratio 8.70:1. Same as the C1B but with an impulse coupled magneto and a crankshaft equipped with one 6.3 order and one 8th order counterweights.
IO-360-C1E6
200 hp (149 kW) at 2700 rpm, Minimum fuel grade 100 or 100LL avgas, compression ratio 8.70:1. Same as the C1C but with different magnetos. This model also has a propeller governor drive on the left front of its crankcase and has a crankshaft equipped with one 6.3 order and one 8th order counterweight.
IO-360-C1E6D
200 hp (149 kW) at 2700 rpm, Minimum fuel grade 100 or 100LL avgas, compression ratio 8.70:1. Same as the C1E6 but with a Bendix D4LN-2021 impulse coupling dual magneto.
IO-360-C1F
200 hp (149 kW) at 2700 rpm, Minimum fuel grade 100 or 100LL avgas, compression ratio 8.70:1. Same as the C1C but with an AN fuel pump and fuel pump drive.
IO-360-C1G6
200 hp (149 kW) at 2700 rpm, Minimum fuel grade 100 or 100LL avgas, compression ratio 8.70:1. Same as the C1D but with two retard magnetos instead of impulse magnetos, a non-machined front governor pad and provision for front bed mounting.

IO-360-D1A
200 hp (149 kW) at 2700 rpm, Minimum fuel grade 100 or 100LL avgas, compression ratio 8.70:1. Same as the C1B but with Dynafocal mounts.
IO-360-E1A
180 hp (134 kW) at 2700 rpm, Minimum fuel grade 91/96 avgas, compression ratio 8.50:1. Same as the B1E but with a retard magneto in place of an impulse coupling type and has Type 2, eighteen degree Dynafocal mounting brackets instead of Type 1, thirty degree brackets.
IO-360-F1A
180 hp (134 kW) at 2700 rpm, Minimum fuel grade 100 or 100LL avgas, compression ratio 8.50:1. Same as the B2F but with a crankshaft with one 6.3 and one 8th order counterweights.
IO-360-J1AD
200 hp (149 kW) at 2700 rpm, Minimum fuel grade 100 or 100LL avgas, compression ratio 8.70:1. Same as the A1B but with Bendix D4LN-2021 dual magneto and provisions for a rear type engine mounting.
IO-360-J1A6D
200 hp (149 kW) at 2700 rpm, Minimum fuel grade 100 or 100LL avgas, compression ratio 8.70:1. Same as the J1AD except crankshaft incorporates one 6.3 order and one 8th order counterweights.
IO-360-K2A
200 hp (149 kW) at 2700 rpm, Minimum fuel grade 100 or 100LL avgas, compression ratio 8.70:1. Same as the A2A except equipped with Bendix S4LN-21-20 magnetos and has provisions for straight conical mounts.
IO-360-L2A
160 hp (119 kW) at 2400 rpm, Minimum fuel grade 91/96 avgas, compression ratio 8.50:1. Same as the B2F but with a lower power rating. An asterisk footnote on Page 3 of the TCDS for the L2A variant states that the "engine has an alternate rating of 180 hp (134 kW) @ 2700 RPM". Used in the Cessna 172R and SP.
IO-360-M1A
180 hp (134 kW) at 2700 rpm, Minimum fuel grade 91/96 avgas, compression ratio 8.50:1. Same as the B1E but with a front inlet fuel injector, propeller governor on front of the crankcase and a retard magneto.
IO-360-M1B
180 hp (134 kW) at 2700 rpm, Minimum fuel grade 91/96 avgas, compression ratio 8.50:1. Same as the M1A but with a rear-mounted propeller governor and impulse magneto.

=== LIO-360 ===
LIO-360-C1E6
200 hp (149 kW) at 2700 rpm, Minimum fuel grade 100 or 100LL avgas, compression ratio 8.70:1. Same as the IO-360-C1E6 except that it has counter-clockwise (reverse) rotation for use on twin-engined aircraft.

=== AIO-360 ===
AIO-360-A1A
200 hp (149 kW) at 2700 rpm, Minimum fuel grade 100 or 100LL avgas, compression ratio 8.70:1. Same as the IO-360-A1A but set up for operation in an inverted position. Differences include a front-mounted propeller governor, two dry oil sumps, dual external oil scavenge pumps, an oil tank, three options of position for fuel injector mounting and provisions for a constant speed propeller.
AIO-360-A1B
200 hp (149 kW) at 2700 rpm, Minimum fuel grade 100 or 100LL avgas, compression ratio 8.70:1. Same as the A1A except it uses an impulse coupling magneto.
AIO-360-A2A
200 hp (149 kW) at 2700 rpm, Minimum fuel grade 100 or 100LL avgas, compression ratio 8.70:1. Same as the A1A but uses a fixed-pitch propeller.
AIO-360-A2B
200 hp (149 kW) at 2700 rpm, Minimum fuel grade 100 or 100LL avgas, compression ratio 8.70:1. Same as the A1A but has one impulse coupling magneto and provision for a fixed-pitch propeller.
AIO-360-B1B
200 hp (149 kW) at 2700 rpm, Minimum fuel grade 100 or 100LL avgas, compression ratio 8.70:1. Same as the A1B except with a front-mounted fuel injector.

=== AEIO-360 ===
AEIO-360-A1A
200 hp (149 kW) at 2700 rpm, Minimum fuel grade 100 or 100LL avgas, compression ratio 8.70:1. Same as the IO-360-A1A but it is equipped with an inverted oil system kit for aerobatic flight.
AEIO-360-A1B
200 hp (149 kW) at 2700 rpm, Minimum fuel grade 100 or 100LL avgas, compression ratio 8.70:1. Same as the IO-360-A1B but it is equipped with an inverted oil system kit for aerobatic flight.
AEIO-360-A1B6
200 hp (149 kW) at 2700 rpm, Minimum fuel grade 100 or 100LL avgas, compression ratio 8.70:1. Same as the IO-360-A1B6 but it is equipped with an inverted oil system kit for aerobatic flight.
AEIO-360-A1C
200 hp (149 kW) at 2700 rpm, Minimum fuel grade 100 or 100LL avgas, compression ratio 8.70:1. Same as the IO-360-A1C but it is equipped with an inverted oil system kit for aerobatic flight.
AEIO-360-A1D
200 hp (149 kW) at 2700 rpm, Minimum fuel grade 100 or 100LL avgas, compression ratio 8.70:1. Same as the IO-360-A1D but it is equipped with an inverted oil system kit for aerobatic flight.

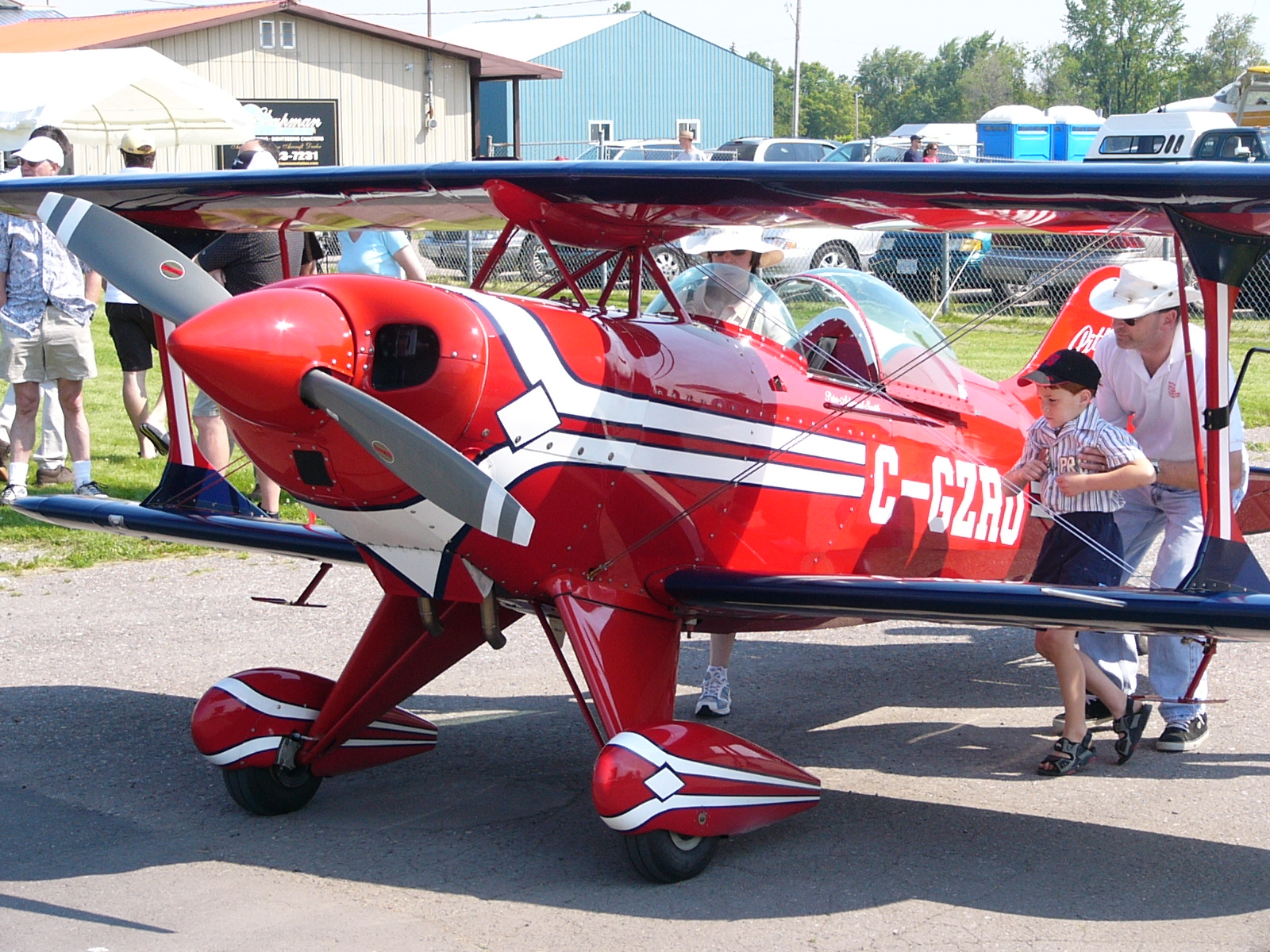
The Aerotek-built Pitts Special S-1T is equipped with a Lycoming AEIO-360-A1E.

AEIO-360-A1E
200 hp (149 kW) at 2700 rpm, Minimum fuel grade 100 or 100LL avgas, compression ratio 8.70:1. Same as the AEIO-360-A1A but with the propeller governor drive on left front of crankcase and Bendix S4LN-21/-20 magnetos.
AEIO-360-A1E6
200 hp (149 kW) at 2700 rpm, Minimum fuel grade 100 or 100LL avgas, compression ratio 8.70:1. Same as AEIO-360-A1E but the crankshaft has one 6.3 order and one 8th order counterweights
AEIO-360-A2A
200 hp (149 kW) at 2700 rpm, Minimum fuel grade 100 or 100LL avgas, compression ratio 8.70:1. Same as the IO-360-A2A but with an inverted oil system kit for aerobatic flight.
AEIO-360-A2B
200 hp (149 kW) at 2700 rpm, Minimum fuel grade 100 or 100LL avgas, compression ratio 8.70:1. Same as the IO-360-A2B but with an inverted oil system kit for aerobatic flight.
AEIO-360-A2C
200 hp (149 kW) at 2700 rpm, Minimum fuel grade 100 or 100LL avgas, compression ratio 8.70:1. Same as the IO-360-A2C but with an inverted oil system kit for aerobatic flight.
AEIO-360-B1B
180 hp (134 kW) at 2700 rpm, Minimum fuel grade 91/96 avgas, compression ratio 8.50:1. Same as the IO-360-B1B but with an inverted oil system kit for aerobatic flight.
AEIO-360-B1D
180 hp (134 kW) at 2700 rpm, Minimum fuel grade 91/96 avgas, compression ratio 8.50:1. Same as the IO-360-B1D but with an inverted oil system kit for aerobatic flight.
AEIO-360-B1F
180 hp (134 kW) at 2700 rpm, Minimum fuel grade 91/96 avgas, compression ratio 8.50:1. Same as the IO-360-B1F but with an inverted oil system kit for aerobatic flight.
AEIO-360-B1F6
180 hp (134 kW) at 2700 rpm, Minimum fuel grade 91/96 avgas, compression ratio 8.50:1. Same as the IO-360-B1F6 but with an inverted oil system kit for aerobatic flight.
AEIO-360-B1G6
180 hp (134 kW) at 2700 rpm, Minimum fuel grade 91/96 avgas, compression ratio 8.50:1. Same as the AEIO-360-B1F6 except equipped with Slick 4051 and 4050 magnetos.
AEIO-360-B2F
180 hp (134 kW) at 2700 rpm, Minimum fuel grade 91/96 avgas, compression ratio 8.50:1. Same as the IO-360-B2F but with an inverted oil system kit for aerobatic flight.
AEIO-360-B2F6
180 hp (134 kW) at 2700 rpm, Minimum fuel grade 91/96 avgas, compression ratio 8.50:1. Same as the IO-360-B2F6 but with an inverted oil system kit for aerobatic flight.
AEIO-360-B1H
180 hp (134 kW) at 2700 rpm, Minimum fuel grade 91/96 avgas, compression ratio 8.50:1. Same as AEIO-360-H1B except has Dynafocal mounting.
AEIO-360-B4A
180 hp (134 kW) at 2700 rpm, Minimum fuel grade 91/96 avgas, compression ratio 8.50:1. Same as the IO-360-B4B but with an inverted oil system kit for aerobatic flight.

AEIO-360-EXP

AEIO-360-H1A
180 hp (134 kW) at 2700 rpm, Minimum fuel grade 91/96 avgas, compression ratio 8.50:1. Same as the AEIO-360-B1G6 but without counterweights and has provision for commercial (straight) engine mount.
AEIO-360-H1B
180 hp (134 kW) at 2700 rpm, Minimum fuel grade 91/96 avgas, compression ratio 8.50:1. Same as the AEIO-360-H1A but with the propeller governor drive on left front of crankcase.

=== HIO-360 ===
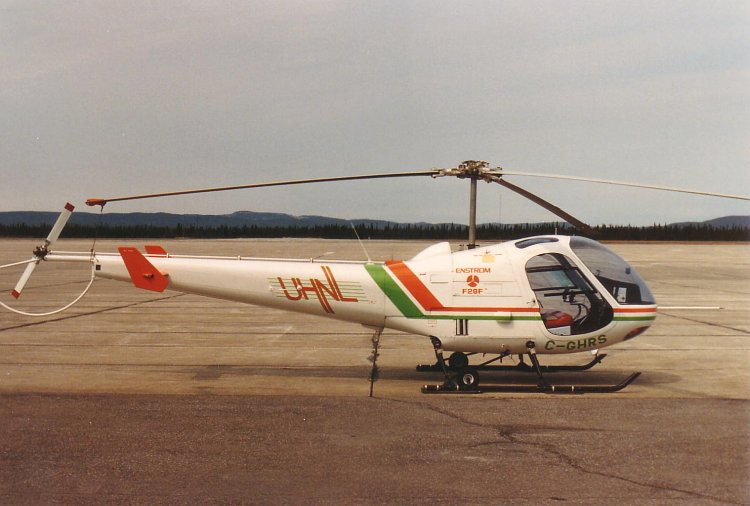
The Enstrom F-28F is equipped with a Lycoming HIO-360-F1AD engine.

HIO-360-A1A
180 hp (134 kW) at 2900 rpm, Minimum fuel grade 100 or 100LL avgas, compression ratio 8.70:1. Same as the IO-360-A1A except that it has a Bendix RSA-5AB1 fuel injector, Bendix S4LN-200 magnetos and lacks provision for propeller governor drive.
HIO-360-A1B
180 hp (134 kW) at 2900 rpm, Minimum fuel grade 100 or 100LL avgas, compression ratio 8.70:1. Same as the HIO-360-A1A but with conical mounts, no AMC unit on the fuel injector and a 90° fuel injector mount.
HIO-360-B1A
180 hp (134 kW) at 2900 rpm, Minimum fuel grade 91/96 avgas, compression ratio 8.50:1. Same as the HIO-360-A1A except for the compression ratio and does not have tuned induction.
HIO-360-B1B
180 hp (134 kW) at 2900 rpm, Minimum fuel grade 91/96 avgas, compression ratio 8.50:1. Same as the HIO-360-B1A except has an AN fuel pump drive.
HIO-360-C1A
205 hp (153 kW) at 2900 rpm, Minimum fuel grade 100 or 100LL avgas, compression ratio 8.70:1. Same as the IO-360-A1A except it has a rear-mounted fuel injector.
HIO-360-C1B
205 hp (153 kW) at 2900 rpm, Minimum fuel grade 100 or 100LL avgas, compression ratio 8.70:1. Same as the HIO-360-C1A except it incorporates Bendix S-1200 series magnetos.
HIO-360-D1A
190 hp (142 kW) at 3200 rpm, Minimum fuel grade 100 or 100LL avgas, compression ratio 10:1. Same as the HIO-360-C1A except incorporates narrow crankpin crankshaft and different fuel injector.
HIO-360-E1AD
190 hp (142 kW) at 2900 rpm, Minimum fuel grade 100 or 100LL avgas, compression ratio 8.00:1. Same as the HIO-360-C1A except with a lower compression ratio piston, equipped with dual magneto and incorporates features suitable for turbocharging. When equipped with the Enstrom Helicopter Corporation turbocharger Kit Number SK-28-121000 or equivalent, these engines are capable of delivering 205 hp (153 kW) at 3000 rpm and a manifold pressure of 36.5 inches Hg absolute.
HIO-360-E1BD
190 hp (142 kW) at 2900 rpm, Minimum fuel grade 100 or 100LL avgas, compression ratio 8.00:1. Same as the HIO-360-E1AD but with a Bendix D4LN-2200 (retard breaker) dual magneto. Eligible for turbosupercharging. When equipped with the Enstrom Helicopter Corporation turbocharger Kit Number SK-28-121000 or equivalent, these engines are capable of delivering 205 hp (153 kW) at 3000 rpm and a manifold pressure of 36.5 inches Hg absolute.
HIO-360-F1AD
190 hp (142 kW) at 3050 rpm, Minimum fuel grade 100 or 100LL avgas, compression ratio 8.00:1. Same as the HIO-360-E1AD but with a large crankshaft, high crush thin wall bearings and a large base circle camshaft. Eligible for turbosupercharging. When equipped with modified Enstrom turbocharger Kit No. SK-28-121000, this engine is capable of delivering 225 hp (168 kW) at 3050 rpm at a manifold pressure of 39 inches Hg to a critical altitude of 12,000 ft (3,658 m).
HIO-360-G1A
180 hp (134 kW) at 2700 rpm, Minimum fuel grade 91/96 avgas, compression ratio 8.00:1. Same as the HO-360-C1A but with PAC RSA-5AD1 fuel injection system

=== LHIO-360 ===
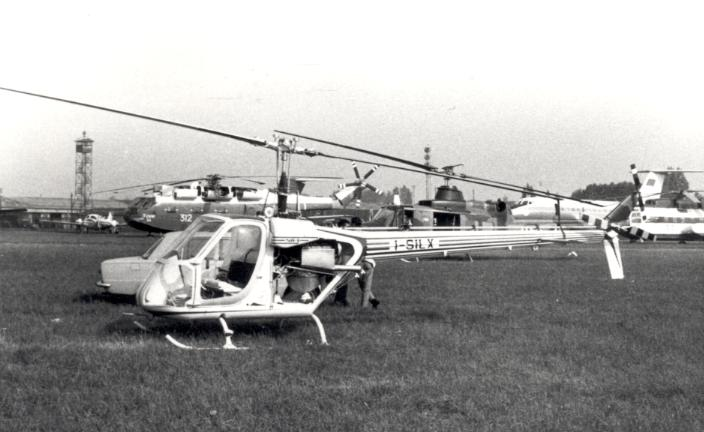
The Silvercraft SH-4 was equipped with an LHIO-360-C1A engine

LHIO-360-C1A
205 hp (153 kW) at 2900 rpm, Minimum fuel grade 100 or 100LL avgas, compression ratio 8.70:1. Same as the HIO-360-C1A but with counter-clockwise (reverse) rotation.
LHIO-360-C1B
205 hp (153 kW) at 2900 rpm, Minimum fuel grade 100 or 100LL avgas, compression ratio 8.70:1. Same as the HIO-360-C1B except with counter-clockwise (reverse) rotation.
LHIO-360-F1AD
190 hp (142 kW) at 3050 rpm, Minimum fuel grade 100 or 100LL avgas, compression ratio 8.00:1. Same as the HIO-360-F1AD but with counter-clockwise (reverse) rotation. Eligible for turbosupercharging. When equipped with modified Enstrom turbocharger Kit No. SK-28-121000, this engine is capable of delivering 225 hp (168 kW) at 3050 rpm at a manifold pressure of 39 inches Hg to a critical altitude of 12,000 ft (3,658 m).

=== TIO-360 ===
TIO-360-A1A
200 hp (149 kW) at 2575 rpm, Minimum fuel grade 100 or 100LL avgas, compression ratio 7.30:1. Turbosupercharger: Bendix RSA-5AD1. Base TIO-360 model: a four-cylinder air-cooled, horizontally opposed direct drive, fuel-injected, tuned induction, turbocharged engine with internal piston cooling oil jets.
TIO-360-A1B
200 hp (149 kW) at 2575 rpm, Minimum fuel grade 100 or 100LL avgas, compression ratio 7.30:1. Turbosupercharger: AiResearch T04. Same as the A1A except that it has a straight tubular casting in the induction system and no pressure differential door on 14° down fuel injector adapter.
TIO-360-A3B6
200 hp (149 kW) at 2575 rpm, Minimum fuel grade 100 or 100LL avgas, compression ratio 7.30:1. Turbosupercharger: AiResearch T04. Same as the A1B but with one 6.3 order and one 8th order counterweights and a pressurized ignition system for high altitude operation.
TIO-360-C1A6D
210 hp (157 kW) at 2575 rpm, Minimum fuel grade 100 or 100LL avgas, compression ratio 7.30:1. Turbosupercharger: Rotomaster 3BT1EE10J2. Same as the T0-360-C1A6D except for a Bendix RSA-5AD1 fuel injector instead of Marvel-Schebler HA-6 carburetor.

== See also ==
- Continental IO-360
