= List of aircraft (Te) =

This is a list of aircraft in alphabetical order beginning with 'Te'.

== Te ==
=== Team Mini-Max ===
- Team Mini-Max 1030F MAX 103
- Team Mini-Max 1100F Mini-MAX
- Team Mini-Max 1100R Mini-MAX
- Team Mini-Max 1500R Sport
- Team Mini-Max 1600R Sport
- Team Mini-Max 1550V V-MAX
- Team Mini-Max 1650R EROS
- Team Mini-Max 1700R Hi-MAX
- Team Mini-Max AeroMax

=== Team Rocket ===
(Team Rocket of Texas)

- Team Rocket F1 Rocket
- Team Rocket F2 Rocket

=== Team Tango ===
(Williston, FL)

- Team Tango Foxtrot 4
- Team Tango Tango 2

=== Tech Aero ===
(Glisolles, France)

- Tech Aero TR 200

=== TechHaus ===
(Lady GaGa art house)

- TechHaus Volantis

=== Technic'air ===
(Belvès, France)

- Technic'air Strato Light
- Technic'air Strato Micro
- Technic'air Fly Roller
- Technic'air Fly Roller Light
- Technic'air Flyroller Magnum Biplace

=== Technoavia ===
- Technoavia SM92 Finist
- Technoavia Rysachok
- Technoavia SP-91 Slava
- Technoavia SM-94
- Technoavia SP-95
- Technoavia SM-2000P

=== Technoflug ===
- Technoflug Piccolo
- Technoflug TKF-2 Carat

=== TechProAviation ===
(Olomouc, Czech Republic)

- TechProAviation Merlin 100

=== Tecma Sport ===
(La Roche-sur-Foron, France and more recently Saint-Pierre-en-Faucigny)

- Tecma Boomerang
- Tecma Colt
- Tecma F1
- Tecma F1 Evolution
- Tecma F1 Tempo
- Tecma FX
- Tecma Ixbo
- Tecma Mambo
- Tecma Medil
- Tecma Medium
- Tecma Mirage
- Tecma Nimbus
- Tecma Nuage
- Tecma Spirale
- Tecma Sport
- Tecma T2
- Tecma U2

=== Tecnam ===
(Construzione Aeronautiche Tecnam)

- Tecnam P92
- Tecnam P96 Golf
- Tecnam P2002
- Tecnam P2004
- Tecnam P2006T
- Tecnam P2008
- Tecnam P2010
- Tecnam P2012 Traveller
- Tecnam Astore
- Tecnam MMA
- Tecnam P-Jet
- Tecnam P-Mentor
- Tecnam Snap

=== Tefft ===
(Leon Tefft, Chicago, IL)

- Tefft Contester A-1

=== Tellier Brothers ===
(Société Alphonse Tellier et Cie à Neuilly)

- Tellier 1909 (T.1)
- Tellier 200hp Hispano-Suiza
- Tellier 200hp Cannon
- Tellier 350hp Sunbeam (T.4)
- Tellier 2x 250hp Hispano-Suiza (T.5)
- Tellier 1100hp Lorraine
- Tellier T.1
- Tellier T.2
- Tellier T.3
- Tellier T.4
- Tellier T.5
- Tellier T.6
- Tellier T.7
- Tellier T.8
- Tellier T.c.6
- Tellier 1918 4-engined flying boat (Vonna)
- Tellier-Nieuport S

=== Teman Aircraft ===
- Teman BiFly
- Teman Mono-Fly
- Teman SuperFly

=== Temco Aircraft ===
(Texas Engineering & Mfg Co Inc (Fdr: Robert McCulloch, H L Howard), Dallas, TX)

- Temco 24
- Temco 33 Plebe
- Temco 51
- Temco 58
- Temco D-16
- Temco GC-1B Swift
- Temco TE-1 Buckaroo
- Temco T-35 Buckaroo
- Temco TT-1 Pinto
- Temco D-16 (Twin Navion)
- Temco Riley 55

=== Tennessee Propellers ===
(Normandy, TN)

- Tennessee Propellers Scout

=== Teradako-ken ===
- Teradako-ken TK-3

=== Teratorn ===
(Teratorn Aircraft, Inc., Clear Lake, IA)

- Teratorn Aircraft Teratorn
- Teratorn T/A
- Teratorn Tierra
- Teratorn Tierra II

=== Tereshchyenko ===
(Fedor Fedorovich Tereshchyenko)

- Tereshchyenko 1909 monoplane
- Tereshchyenko Zembinsky monoplanes
- Tereshchyenko No. 5
- Tereshchyenko No. 5bis
- Tereshchyenko No. 6
- Tereshchyenko No. 7

=== Terle ===
(Joseph Terle, Long Island, NY)

- Terle Sportplane

=== Termite ===
(Termite Aircraft (Fdr: Wilbur L Smith), Bloomington, IL)

- Termite 1957 monoplane

=== Terrafugia ===
(Terrafugia (Pres: Carl Dietrich), Woburn, MA)

- Terrafugia Transition
- Terrafugia TF-X

=== Terrell & Larson ===
(E E Terrell & B Larsen, 3145 Cuthbert St, Oakland, CA)

- Terrell & Larson 1929 Biplane

=== Terrier ===
(Airworthy Airplane Co, Chicago, IL)

- Terrier 1928 Monoplane

=== Terril ===
(Howard L Terril, Torrance, CA)

- Terril Poopsi-Doll HLT-100
- Terril Shushonik
- Terril Special HLT-101

=== Teruo Kago ===
(Teruo Kago)

- Teruo Kago TK-1

=== Tervamäki ===
(Jukka Tervamäki)

- Tervamäki JT-1
- Tervamäki JT-2
- Tervamäki-Eerola ATE-3
- Tervamäki JT-5
- Tervamäki JT-6

=== Terzi Aerodyne ===
- Pietro Terzi Lucy THM
- Terzi T-9 Stiletto
- Terzi T30 Katana

=== Tesori ===
(Robert Tesori)

- Tesori Scale Reggiane

=== Tessier ===
(Rene Tessier)

- Tessier Biplane

=== TeST ===
(TeST sro (Division of Comp-Let sro), Velké Meziříĉi)

- TeST TST-1 Alpin
- TeST TST-3 Alpin T
- TeST TST-5 Variant
- TeST TST-6 Duo
- TeST TST-7 Junior
- Test TST-8DM Alpin
- TeST TST-9 Junior
- TeST TST-10 Atlas
- TeST TST-12
- TeST TST-13 Junior
- TeST TST-14 Bonus
- TeST TST-14J BonusJet

=== Teston ===
(Georgia)

- Teston Low-Wing

=== Texas ===
(Texas A&M College Aircraft Research Center. / Fred E. Weick)

- Texas Ag-1
- Texas Ag-2
- Texas Ag-3

=== Texas ===
- Williams Texas-Temple Sportsman

=== Texas Aircraft Manufacturing ===
(Hondo, Texas)

- Texas Aircraft Colt
- Texas Aircraft eColt
- Texas Aircraft Stallion

=== Texas Helicopter ===
(Texas Helicopter Corporation )

- Texas Helicopter M74 Wasp
- Texas Helicopter M74A
- Texas Helicopter M79S Wasp II
- Texas Helicopter M79T Jet Wasp II
