= List of aircraft manufacturers (T–Z) =

This is a list of aircraft manufacturers sorted alphabetically by International Civil Aviation Organization (ICAO)/common name. It contains the ICAO/common name, manufacturers name(s), country and other data, with the known years of operation in parentheses.

The ICAO names are listed in bold. Having an ICAO name does not mean that a manufacturer is still in operation today. Just that some of the aircraft produced by that manufacturer are still flying.

== T ==
- **TAI**, Turkish Aerospace Industries – Turkey
- **Taifun**, Taifun Experimental Design Bureau – Russia
- Taiwan Dancer, Nangang Village, Dayuan District, Taoyuan City, Taiwan
- **Tamarind**, Tamarind International Ltd – United States
- Tampier, Tampier – France
- **Taneja**, Taneja Aerospace and Aviation Ltd – India
- **Tapanee**, Tanapee Aviation Inc – Canada
- **Taylor (1)**, Taylor Aircraft Company – United States
- **Taylor (2)**, Moulton B. Taylor – United States
- **Taylor (3)**, C. Gilbert Taylor – United States
- **Taylor (3)**, Taylor Aero Inc – United States
- **Taylor (4)**, John F. Taylor – United Kingdom
- **Taylor Kits**, Taylor Kits Corporation – United States
- **Taylorcraft (1)**, Taylorcraft Aircraft – United States
- **Taylorcraft (1)**, Taylorcraft Aviation Company – United States
- **Taylorcraft (1)**, Taylorcraft Aviation Corporation – United States
- **Taylorcraft (1)**, Taylorcraft Inc – United States
- **Taylorcraft (2)**, Taylorcraft Aeroplanes (England) Ltd – United Kingdom, (1938–1946) > Auster
- **Taylor-Young**, Taylor-Young Airplane Company – United States
- **TBM**, TBM Corporation – France/United States
- **TBM**, TBM SA – France
- **Teal**, Teal Aircraft Corporation – United States
- **Team Rocket**, Team Rocket Inc – United States
- **Team Tango**, Revolution Aviation Inc., Williston, Florida, United States
- **Tech'aero**, Tech'Aero – France
- Technic'air, Belvès, France
- **Technoavia**, Nauchno-Kommerchesky Firma Technoavia – Russia
- **Technoflug**, Technoflug Leichtflugzeugbau GmbH – Germany
- Tecma Sport, La Roche-sur-Foron, France
- **Tecnam**, Costruzioni AeronauticheTecnam Srl – Italy
- **Ted Smith**, Ted R. Smith & Associates – United States
- **Ted Smith**, Ted Smith Aerostar Corporation – United States
- **Ted Smith**, Ted Smith Aircraft Company Inc – United States
- **Temco**, Temco Aircraft Corporation – United States
- **Temco**, Texas Engineering & Manufacturing Company Inc – United States
- **Tennessee Valley**, Tennessee Valley Aviation Products Ltd – United States
- **Teratorn Aircraft**, Clear Lake, Iowa, United States
- **Terr-Mar**, Terr-Mar Aviation Corporation – Canada
- **Terzi**, Terzi Aerodine – Italy
- **Texas Airplane**, Texas Airplane Factory – United States
- **Texas Helicopter**, Texas Helicopter Corporation – United States
- Thomas-Martin, Thomas-Martin – Unknown
- Thaden Metal Aircraft Company, United States
- **The Airplane Factory**, Tedderfield Airpark, Eikenhof, Johannesburg South, South Africa
- **Theiss Aviation**, Salem, Ohio, United States
- **Thorp**, John W. Thorp – United States
- **Thorp**, Thorp 211 Aircraft Company Inc – United States
- **Thorp**, Thorp Aero Inc – United States
- **Thorp**, Thorp Aircraft – United States
- **Thorp**, Thorp Engineering Company – United States
- **Thrush**, Thrush Aircraft Inc – United States
- **Thruster Air Services**, Langworth, Lincoln, England, United Kingdom
- **Thunder Wings**, Thunder Wings, Division of Thunder Development Inc – United States
- **Thurston**, Thurston Aeromarine Corporation – United States
- **Thurston**, Thurston Aircraft Corporation – United States
- **Tiger**, Tiger Aircraft LLC – United States
- Time to Fly, Kaunas, Lithuania
- **Time Warp**, Time Warp Aircraft Inc – United States
- **Tipsy**, Ernest Oscar Tips – Belgium
- **Titan**, Titan Aircraft Company – United States
- **TM Aircraft**, TM Aircraft – United States
- TNCA, Talleres Nacionales de Construcciones Aeronáuticas – Mexico
- Tomark, Tomark s.r.o., Prešov, Slovakia
- **Toyota**, Toyota Motor Corporation – Japan
- **Tradewind Turbines**, Tradewind Turbines Corporation – United States
- Trago Mills, Trago Mills – United Kingdom
- **Transall**, Arbeitsgemeinschaft Transall – Germany/France
- **Transavia Corporation**, Transavia Corporation Pty Ltd – Australia
- **Transavia**, Transavia Division of Transfield (NSW) Pty Ltd – Australia
- Trans-Florida, Trans Florida Aviation – United States, > Cavalier Aircraft
- **Travel Air**, Travel Air Company – United States, (1924–1931) > Curtiss-Wright Aeronautical Corporation
- **Travel Air**, Travel Air Manufacturing Company Inc – United States
- **Trecker**, Trecker Aircraft Corporation – United States
- Trekking Parapentes, Saint-Mathieu-de-Tréviers, France
- Triavio, (Triavio SRL), Catania, Italy
- **Tridair**, Tridair Helicopters Inc – United States
- **Trident**, Trident Aircraft Ltd – Canada
- Trio-Twister, Eichwalde, Germany
- **TRI-R**, Tri-R Technologies Inc – United States
- Triumph, Triumph Group Inc – United States
- Trixy Aviation Products GmbH, Dornbirn, Austria
- Tucker, Tucker Aviation Company – United States
- Tugan Aircraft, Tugan Aircraft Company Limited – Australia, (?-1936) > Commonwealth Aircraft Corporation
- **Tupolev**, Aviatsionny Nauchno-Tekhnishesky Kompleks Imeni A N Tupoleva OAO – Russia
- **Tupolev**, Tupolev OKB – Russia
- **Turbine Design**, Turbine Design Inc – United States
- **Turner**, E. L. Turner – United States
- **TUSAS**, TUSAS Aerospace Industries Inc – Turkey
- **TUSAS**, TUSAS Havacilik ve Uzay Sanayi AS – Turkey
- **TUSCO**, Tulsa Manufacturing Corporation – United States
- **TWI**, TWI Flugzeuggesellschaft mbH – Germany

== U ==
- U&C UAS – Prague, Czech Republic
- **Udet**, Udet-Flugzeugbau GmbH – Germany
- **Uetz**, Walter Uetz Flugzeugbau – Switzerland
- **UL-Jih**, Kaplice, Czech Republic
- **UFO**, Ultimate Flying Object Inc – New Zealand
- **Ullmann**, Ullmann Aircraft Company – United States
- **Ultimate**, Ultimate Aircraft Division of Ultimate Aerobatics Ltd – Canada
- **Ultravia**, Ultravia Aero International Inc – Canada
- **Umbaugh**, Umbaugh Aircraft Corporation – United States
- **Umbra**, Aeronautica Umbra – Italy
- **UNC**, UNC Helicopter – United States
- **Unikomtranso**, Unikomtranso AO – Russia
- **Unis**, Unis Obchodni spol sro – Czech Republic
- **United Canada**, United Aircraft of Canada – Canada
- **United Aircraft Corporation**, United Aircraft Corporation – Russia
- **United Consultant**, United Consultant Corporation – United States
- UP International GmbH, Garmisch-Partenkirchen, Germany, formerly known as UP Europe, UP Products and Ultralite Products
- **Urban**, Urban Air sro – Czech Republic
- **Utilicraft Aerospace Industries**, Utilicraft Aerospace Industries – United States
- U-Turn GmbH, Villingen-Schwenningen, Germany
- **UTVA**, UTVA Fabrika Aviona – Yugoslavia, (1937–Present)
- **UTVA**, UTVA-Sour Metalne Industrije, RO Fabrika Aviona – Yugoslavia

== V ==
- **Valentin**, Valentin Flugzeugbau GmbH – Germany
- **Valladeau**, Valladeau – France
- **Valmet**, Valmet Aviation Industries – Finland
- **Valmet**, Valmet OY, Kuoreveden Tehdas (Kuorevesi Works) – Kuorevesi, Finland
- **Valmet**, Valmet OY, Lentokonetehdas (Aircraft Factory) – Tampere, Finland
- Valtion Lentokonetehdas (VL; Government Aircraft Factory) – Helsinki and Tampere, Finland
- Valtion Metallitehtaat (VMT; Government Metal Factories) – Finland
- Vancil, Belton, South Carolina, United States
- **Van's**, Van's Aircraft Inc – United States
- **Vardax**, Vardax Corporation – United States
- **Varga**, Varga Aircraft Corporation – United States
- **VAT**, Vertical Aviation Technologies Inc – United States
- **VEB**, Vereinigung Volkseigener Betriebe Flugzeugbau Dresden – Germany
- VEF, Valsts Elektrotehniska Fabrika – Latvia, (State Electrotechnical Plant)
- Veljekset Karhumaki, Veljekset Karhumaki OY – Finland
- **Velocity**, Velocity Inc – United States
- **Venture**, Venture Light Aircraft Resources LLC – United States
- **Venus**, Venus Aerospace – United States
- **Verilite**, Verilite Aircraft Company Inc – United States
- **Vertol**, Vertol Aircraft Company – United States, (1956–1960) > Boeing
- VFW, Vereinigte Flugtechnische Werke GmbH – Germany
- Verville Aircraft – United States
- **VFW**, VFW-Fokker GmbH – Germany
- **Vickers**, Vickers (Aviation) Ltd – United Kingdom
- **Vickers**, Vickers-Armstrongs (Aircraft) Ltd – United Kingdom
- **Vickers-Slingsby**, Vickers-Slingsby Division of Vickers Ltd Offshore Engineering Group – United Kingdom
- **Victa**, Victa Ltd – Australia
- Victory Aircraft, Victory Aircraft Company – Canada, (?-1945) > Avro Canada
- **Vidor**, Giuseppe Vidor – Italy
- **Viking Air**, North Saanich, British Columbia, Canada
- **Viking Aircraft Inc**, Panama City Beach, Florida, United States
- **Viking Aircraft LLC**, Elkhorn, Wisconsin, United States
- **Viking**, Viking Aircraft Ltd – United States
- **Viper**, Viper Aircraft Corporation – United States
- **Visionaire**, VisionAire Corporation – United States
- **Vitek**, Kompaniya Vitek – Russia
- Voisin, Appareils d'Aviation Les Frères Voisin – France, (Les Frères Voisin)
- **Volaircraft**, Volaircraft Inc – United States
- **Volmer**, Volmer Aircraft – United States
- **Volmer**, Volmer Jensen – United States
- **Volpar**, Volpar Inc – United States
- Vortech, Inc., Fallston, Maryland, United States
- **Vought**, Vought Aircraft Company – United States, (1961–1976)
- **Vought**, Vought Corporation – United States
- **Vought-Sikorsky**, Vought-Sikorsky Division of United Aircraft – United States
- **VSR**, VSR – United States
- **VSTOL**, V-STOL Aircraft Corporation – United States
- **VTOL Aircraft**, VTOL Aircraft Pty Ltd – Australia
- Vulcan Motor and Engineering, Vulcan Motor and Engineering Company Ltd. – United Kingdom
- **VulcanAir**, VulcanAir SpA – Italy
- **Vultee**, Vultee Aircraft Division of Avco – United States, (?-1943) > Convair
- **Vultee**, Vultee Aircraft Inc – United States

== W ==
- **WACO**, Weaver Aircraft Company – United States
- **Waco**, Advance Aircraft Company – United States
- **Waco**, Waco Aircraft Company – United States
- **WACO Classic Aircraft**, Waco Classic Aircraft Corporation – United States
- **Wagaero**, WagAero Inc, Lyons, Wisconsin, United States
- Walkerjet, Třemošná, Czech Republic
- **Wallerkowski**, Heinz Wallerkowski – Germany
- **WAR**, War Aircraft Replicas – United States
- **WAR**, War Aircraft Replicas International Inc – United States
- **Warner (1)**, Richard Warner Aviation Inc – United States
- Warner Aircraft Corporation (c1930s) – United States
- **Warner Aerocraft**, United States
- Wasp Systems, later Wasp Flight Systems, Crook, Cumbria, United Kingdom
- **Wassmer**, Société des Etablissements Benjamin Wassmer – France
- **Wassmer**, Wassmer Aviation SA – France
- Watanabe, Watanabe Aircraft Plant – Japan, > Kyūshū
- **Watson**, Gary Watson – United States
- **Weatherly**, Weatherly Aviation Company Inc – United States
- Wedell-Williams, Wedell-Williams Air Service Corporation – United States
- Weir, G. and J. Weir – United Kingdom
- **Wendt**, Wendt Aircraft Engineering – United States
- Werft Warnemünde, Werft Warnemünde – Germany, (1917–1925) > Arado
- Weser Flugzeugbau GmbH, Weser Flugzeugbau GmbH – Germany, (Weserflug)
- West Australian Airways, West Australian Airways – Australia
- **Western**, Western Aircraft Supplies – Canada
- **Westland**, GKN Westland Helicopters Ltd – United Kingdom
- **Westland**, Westland Aircraft Ltd – United Kingdom
- **Westland**, Westland Helicopters Ltd – United Kingdom
- Weymann-Lepere, Weymann-Lepere (Societe des Avions) – France
- **Whatley**, Vascoe Whatley Jr – United States
- **Wheeler**, Wheeler Aircraft Company – United States
- **Wheeler**, Wheeler Technology Inc – United States
- **White**, E. Marshall White – United States
- **White Lightning**, White Lightning Aircraft Corporation – United States
- Whittlesey Body, Whittlesey Body Co. Inc. – United States
- **Wilden**, Helmut Wilden – Germany
- Wills Wing, Santa Ana, California, United States
- **Windecker**, Windecker Industries Inc – United States
- **Windexair**, Windexair AB – Sweden
- Winds Italia, Bologna, Italy
- **Windspire Inc.**, Long Green, Maryland, United States
- Windtech Parapentes, Gijón, Spain
- Windward Performance, Windward Performance – United States
- **Wing Aeronautical Solutions**, Wing Aeronautical Solutions – Portugal
- Wing, Wing Aircraft Company – United States
- Wings of Change, Fulpmes, Austria
- Wings Of Freedom, Hubbard, Ohio, United States
- **Wingtip To Wingtip**, Wingtip to Wingtip LLC – United States
- **Witteman-Lewis**, Witteman-Lewis Aircraft Company- United States
- Wittman, Steve J. Wittman – United States
- **Wolf**, Donald S. Wolf – United States
- **Wolfsberg**, Wolfsberg Aircraft Corporation NV – Belgium
- **Wolfsberg**, Wolfsberg-Evektor SRO – Czech Republic
- **Wolfsberg**, Wolfsberg Letecká továrna SRO – Czech Republic
- **Wombat Gyrocopters**, St Columb, Cornwall, United Kingdom
- **Woods**, H. L. Woods – United States
- Worldwide Ultralite Industries, United States
- **Wren**, Wren Aircraft Corporation – United States
- Wright Aeronautical, Wright Aeronautical – United States, (1919–1929)
- Wright Company, Wright Company – United States, (1909–1916)
- Wright-Martin, Wright-Martin – United States, (1916–1919)
- WRM Motors of Oxford, WRM Motors of Oxford – United Kingdom, (William Richard Morris)
- Wrobel, Gerard Wrobel, Beynes, Alpes-de-Haute-Provence, France
- WSK, Wytwórnia Sprzetu Komunikacyjnego – Poland
- **Wuhan**, Wuhan Helicopter General Aviation Corporation – China
- **Wüst**, Wüst GmbH – Germany
- Wytwórnia i Naprawa Konstrukcji Lekkich (Wytwórnia i Naprawa Konstrukcji Lekkich) – Poland, (1996–1999)
- **WZL 3**, Wojskowe Zaklady Lotnicze Nr. 3 – Poland

== X ==
- **Xian**, Xian Aircraft Company – China
- Xplorer UltraFlight, Cape Town, South Africa
- **XtremeAir**, Cochstedt, Germany

== Y ==
- **Yakovlev**, Moskovskii Mashinostroitelnyy Zavod "Skorost" Imeni A. S. Yakovleva – Russia
- **Yakovlev**, Opytno-Konstruktorskoye Byuro Imeni A S Yakovleva OAO – Russia
- **Yakovlev**, Yakovlev Aviatsionnoye Korporatsiya OAO – Russia
- **Yakovlev**, Yakovlev OKB – Russia
- **Yalo**, Zaklad Naprawy i Budowy Sprzetu Latajacego Yalo SC – Poland
- **Yermolaev**, Yermolaev OKB-240 - Russia
- Yokosuka Naval Arsenal, Yokosuka Naval Arsenal – Japan, (aka First Naval Air Technical Arsenal)

== Z ==
- **Zenair**, Zenair Ltd – Canada
- **Zenith**, Zénith Aircraft Company – United States
- Zero Gravity Paragliders, JM International Company Limited, Seoul, South Korea
- **ZLIN Aircraft**, ZLIN Aircraft a.s. – Czech Republic
- **Zivko**, Zivko Aeronautics Inc – United States
- Zlin Aviation, Zlin Aviation s.r.o. – Czech Republic
- Zmaj, Fabrika aviona Zmaj – Yugoslavia

== See also ==
- Aircraft
- List of aircraft engine manufacturers
- List of aircraft manufacturers
