= Tellier T.6 =

French patrol flying boat of World War I

Tc.6

General information
- Type: Patrol flying boat
- National origin: France
- Manufacturer: Tellier
- Primary user: French navy
- Number built: 55

History
- Introduction date: 1917
- First flight: 1917
- Developed from: Tellier T.2; Tellier T.3

The Tellier T.6, also known as the Tellier TC.6 was a French flying boat produced for maritime patrol during World War I. It was a development of the Tellier T.3 with added cannon armament (Hence the C in the TC version of the designation) and a lengthened fuselage. Fifty-five examples served with the French Navy in the Atlantic and Mediterranean from 1917 until the end of the war. After the armistice, some examples served as training aircraft until 1922.

== Design ==
Like the T.2 and T.3 from which it was developed, the T.6 was a two-and-a-half bay, equal-span, un-staggered biplane flying boat. The lower wings were mounted to the top of the fuselage sides, and wire bracing was used between the wings, and between the wings and the fuselage. It had a conventional tail, also braced with wire. Outrigger floats were carried underneath the tips of the lower wings. A single engine was mounted in the interplane gap, driving a pusher propeller.

The T.6's cannon armament consisted of a single 47-millimetre (1 3/4 in) Hotchkiss model 1885 naval gun carried on a transverse mount in an open position at the bow. This mounting allowed for the cannon to be depressed up to 55°. The open cockpit for the pilot was aft of this, just in front of the wing cellule.

The hull was covered in plywood, and the wings and tail surfaces in canvas.

== Development ==
The development of the T.6 was a response to a very specific military problem. By 1917, German submarines posed a threat to Allied ships in several parts of the Atlantic and Mediterranean. The small bombs carried by the flying boats deployed against them were only effective with a direct hit, but the bomb sights of the time were not accurate enough to make this likely. Cannon armament seemed to offer a solution to this problem, and in Spring 1917, the Centre d'Aéronautique Maritime de Camaret fitted a Donnet-Denhaut flying boat with a 37-millimetre (1 1/2 in) cannon for trials. This aircraft proved underpowered for this use, so the Navy requested Tellier to modify a T.3 to carry an even larger gun.

The 47-mm cannon, its gunner, plus twenty or thirty rounds of ammunition added around 700 kilograms (1,500 lb) to the bow, which substantially altered the aircraft's centre of gravity. Tellier compensated for this by adding a 0.87-metre (2 ft 10 in) stretch to the rear fuselage. The fuselage interior was also reinforced to better withstand the cannon recoil. Even so, the T.6 inherited a weak structure from the T.3, and required further strengthening when the type entered service.

The prototype T.6 was tested at Saint-Raphaël for its air- and seaworthiness and for its ability to fire its cannon in flight. The type was accepted for military service, and the Navy placed an order for 85 T.6s in July 1917, together with an extra 20 T.3s. Total orders eventually reached 110 aircraft, but only 55 were delivered by the armistice.

== Operational history ==
T.6s served alongside T.3s and other flying boats at Saint-Raphaël, Bayonne, Brest-Camaret, Cherbourg, Lorient, and throughout the Mediterranean, including Africa, Corsica, Italy and Greece. Squadron records of the time generally refer to aircraft by their identification number within the squadron, but since these squadrons operated a mixture of types, it is difficult now to be certain which types of flying boats participated in which actions.

In operational use, the T.6 proved less effective than hoped. The cannon proved difficult to aim, its sights were inadequate, and gunners were not well-enough trained to use the weapon. In February 1918, the Centre d'aviation maritime de Cherbourg recommended that a "bomb-launcher" for 52-kilogram (115 lb) bombs be fitted to the T.6s, and that the aircraft take off with only 60% of their normal fuel loads to offset the weight penalty. Such launchers were fitted to newly-built T.6s from August 1918 onwards, but the armament problem had not been resolved by the armistice..

After the war, the cannons were removed from surviving T.6s, and some were used for training until 1922.

== Specifications ==
Data from Davilla and Soltan 2002, p.535

General characteristics

- Crew: two
- Length: 12.71 m (41 ft 8 in)
- Wingspan: 15.60 m (51 ft 2 in)
- Height: 3.40 m (11 ft 2 in)
- Wing area: 47 m^{2} (510 sq ft)
- Empty weight: 1,210 kg (2,668 lb)
- Gross weight: 2,670 kg (5,886 lb)
- Powerplant: 1 × Hispano-Suiza 8Ac V-8, water-cooled piston engine, 150 kW (200 hp)

Performance

- Maximum speed: 125 km/h (78 mph, 67 kn)
- Endurance: 3 hours
- Time to altitude: 500 metres (1,600 ft) in 7 minutes
  1,000 metres (3,300 ft) in 13 minutes
  200 metres (660 ft) in 29 minutes

Armament

- Guns: 1 × Hotchkiss canon de 47 mm modèle 1885 with 20–30 rounds of ammunition

== Notes ==
=== Bibliography ===
- Balous, Miroslav (2011). "Tellier T.6". Letectvi + kosmonautika. No. 7. Bratislava: Magnet Press. pp. 24–25.
- Borget, Michel (June 1996). "Des coques et des ailes 2 – Alphonse Tellier, constructeur d'hydro-aéro". Le Fana de l'Aviation. No. 319. Paris: Editions Lariviere. pp. 22–35.
- Davilla, James J.; Soltan, Arthur M. (2002). French aircraft of the First World War. Boulder, Colorado: Flying Machines Press.
- Hornát, Jiří (1991). "Tellier T.3 (Tellier 200 HP) Tc.6 (Tellier Canon)". Letectvi + kosmonautika. Vol. 67, no. 2. Prague: Magnet Press. pp. 39/79.
- Taylor, Michael J. H. (1993). Jane's Encyclopedia of Aviation. London: Studio Editions.
