= Texas Aircraft Stallion =

Ultralight aircraft

Stallion
- Stallion prototype in flight

General information
- Type: Light-sport aircraft
- National origin: Brazil/United States
- Manufacturer: Texas Aircraft Manufacturing
- Designer: INPAER Caio Jordão (Designer)
- Status: Under development (2023)
- Number built: 2 (July 2023)

History
- Manufactured: 2023
- First flight: 2023

The Texas Aircraft Stallion is a Brazilian and American special light-sport aircraft under development by INPAER of Campinas, São Paulo, Brazil, for production by its sister company, Texas Aircraft Manufacturing of Hondo, Texas. The chief designer is Caio Jordão. Intended for personal use and flight training, the design is expected to be first publicly shown at Sun 'n Fun in Lakeland, Florida in April 2024. The aircraft is intended to be supplied complete and ready-to-fly.

As of July 2023 one prototype had been built and flown by INPAER in Brazil.

== Design and development ==
The aircraft was designed to comply with the Brazilian and American light-sport aircraft rules as expected to be modified under the Federal Aviation Administration's proposed Modernization of Special Airworthiness Certificates (MOSAIC) rules. These new rules are expected to allow four seat LSAs up to a gross weight of 3,000 lb (1,361 kg), with a maximum 61 kn (113 km/h; 70 mph) stall speed to be allowed in the US. Since Brazil has already approved the new regulations, the company expects to have the aircraft approved under the new rules in Brazil by mid-2024 and then in the US later.

The design features a strut-braced high-wing; a four-seat, enclosed cabin, accessed by extra-wide doors; fixed tricycle landing gear with wheel pants and a single engine in tractor configuration.

The aircraft is made from aluminum sheet over a welded 4130 steel cabin space frame. Standard engines available will be the 200 hp (149 kW) Lycoming IO-360 and 260 hp (194 kW) Lycoming IO-540 air-cooled, four-stroke powerplants.

Flight testing of the first prototype was underway in July 2023, at INPAER's plant in Campinas, Sao Paulo, Brazil.

== Specifications (Stallion SLSA) ==
Data from Manufacturer, AVweb

General characteristics

- Crew: one
- Capacity: three passengers
- Empty weight: 1,653 lb (750 kg)
- Gross weight: 2,866 lb (1,300 kg)
- Fuel capacity: 79 U.S. gallons (300 L; 66 imp gal)
- Powerplant: 1 × Lycoming IO-360 four cylinder, air-cooled, four stroke aircraft engine, 200 hp (150 kW)

Performance

- Maximum speed: 160 kn (180 mph, 300 km/h)
- Cruise speed: 145 kn (167 mph, 269 km/h)
- Stall speed: 52 kn (60 mph, 96 km/h) with flaps down
- Never exceed speed: 203 kn (234 mph, 376 km/h)
- Range: 1,144 nmi (1,316 mi, 2,119 km)

== See also ==
- Texas Aircraft Colt
