= Wills Wing XC =

American hang glider

XC
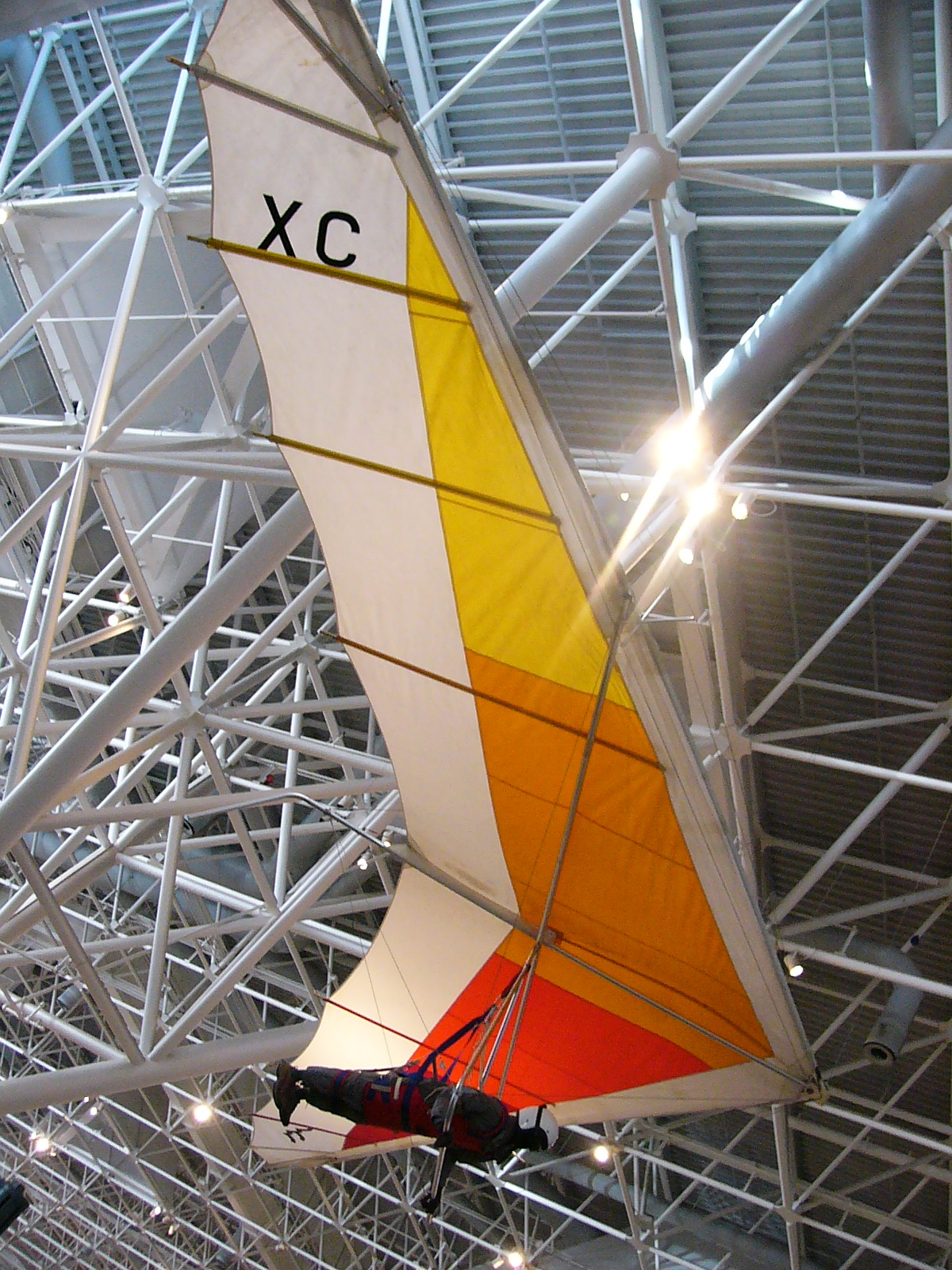
- Wills Wing XC at the Canada Aviation and Space Museum

General information
- Type: Hang glider
- National origin: United States
- Manufacturer: Wills Wing
- Status: Production completed

History
- Manufactured: 1977-1980
- Introduction date: 1977

The Wills Wing XC (Cross Country) is an American high-wing, single-place, hang glider that was designed and produced by Wills Wing of Santa Ana, California. Now out of production, when it was available the aircraft was supplied complete and ready-to-fly.

The XC was Wills Wing's third hang glider model produced.

== Design and development ==
The aircraft is made from aluminum tubing, with the single-surface wing covered in Dacron sailcloth and cable braced from a single kingpost.

The XC models are each named for their rough wing area in square feet.

== Variants ==
XC-132
Very small-sized model for lighter pilots. Pilot hook-in weight range is 120 to 220 lb (54 to 100 kg).
XC-142
Small-sized model for lighter pilots. Pilot hook-in weight range is 140 to 240 lb (64 to 109 kg).
XC-155
Mid-sized model for medium-weight pilots. Pilot hook-in weight range is 170 to 280 lb (77 to 127 kg).
XC-185
Large-sized model for heavier pilots. The wing has a span of 10.9 m (35.8 ft). The glider empty weight is 25 kg (55 lb).

== Aircraft on display ==
- Canada Aviation and Space Museum - XC-185

== Specifications (XC-185) ==
Data from Canada Aviation and Space Museum

General characteristics

- Crew: one
- Length: 11 ft 2 in (3.4 m)
- Wingspan: 35 ft 9 in (10.9 m)
- Empty weight: 55 lb (25 kg)
