= Walkerjet =

- Company type: Privately held company
- Industry: Aerospace
- Founded: 1998
- Founder: Victor Procházka
- Headquarters: Tatiná, Czech Republic
- Products: Paramotors
- Website: www.walkerjet.cz

Walkerjet is a Czech aircraft manufacturer based in Tatiná and founded by Victor Procházka. The company specializes in the design and manufacture of paramotors in the form of ready-to-fly aircraft for the US FAR 103 Ultralight Vehicles rules and the European microlight category.

The company was founded in 1998 by Procházka after he had been involved in ultralight aviation since the late 1980s. The company was initially located in Třemošná, but in 2005 the company moved into a new building in Tatiná, a small village located close to Plzeň.

By the mid-2000s the company offered a wide range of paramotors, including the Swedish Radne Raket 120-powered Walkerjet Spider, the German Solo 210-powered Super Hawk and the Simon series all powered by the Italian Simonini Mini 2 Plus engine. The company also once built a dedicated flight training paramotor, the Walkerjet Schoolboy with a reinforced chassis. The company later designed its own Fly engine series and its more recent paramotor designs, the Walkerjet XC 100 evo and the XC 200 evo, use these in place of the earlier powerplants from other manufacturers.

== Aircraft ==
Summary of aircraft built by Walkerjet
Model name	First flight	Number built	Type
Walkerjet Schoolboy	2000s		training paramotor
Walkerjet Simon	2000s		paramotor
Walkerjet Spider	2000s		paramotor
Walkerjet Super Hawk	2000s		paramotor
Walkerjet XC 100 evo	2010s		paramotor
Walkerjet XC 200 evo	2010s		paramotor
