= Terzi T-9 Stiletto =

Italian two-seat light aircraft

T-9 Stiletto

General information
- Type: Two-seat light sport monoplane
- National origin: Italy
- Manufacturer: Terzi Aerodyne
- Designer: Pietro Terzi

History
- First flight: December 1990

The Terzi T-9 Stiletto is an Italian two-seat light aircraft designed by Milanese aeronautical engineer Pietro Terzi who built a demonstrative prototype at his firm Terzi Aerodyne based in Milan, Italy.

== Design and development ==
The Stiletto is a two-seat low-wing monoplane designed under FAR 23 regulations, that meets the FAA (LSA) Light Sport Aircraft rules. It is mainly metal construction but has a glassfibre cabin enclosure. It has a fixed nosewheel landing gear and is powered by a nose-mounted Rotax 912A piston engine. The cantilever wings and the demountable tailboom of aluminium alloy structure carrying the empennages can be detached for transport and storage.

== Specifications ==
Data from Taylor.

General characteristics

- Crew: 1
- Capacity: 1
- Length: 6.85 m (22 ft 6 in)
- Wingspan: 10.26 m (33 ft 8 in)
- Height: 2.3 m (7 ft 7 in)
- Wing area: 12.3 m^{2} (132 sq ft)
- Aspect ratio: 8.558
- Empty weight: 380 kg (838 lb)
- Max takeoff weight: 650 kg (1,433 lb)
- Powerplant: 1 × Rotax 912A piston, 58 kW (78 hp)
- Propellers: 2-bladed fixed pitch

Performance

- Maximum speed: 200 km/h (124 mph, 108 kn) 75% power
- Stall speed: 74 km/h (46 mph, 40 kn) with flaps
