= Technoflug Piccolo =

German motor glider

Piccolo
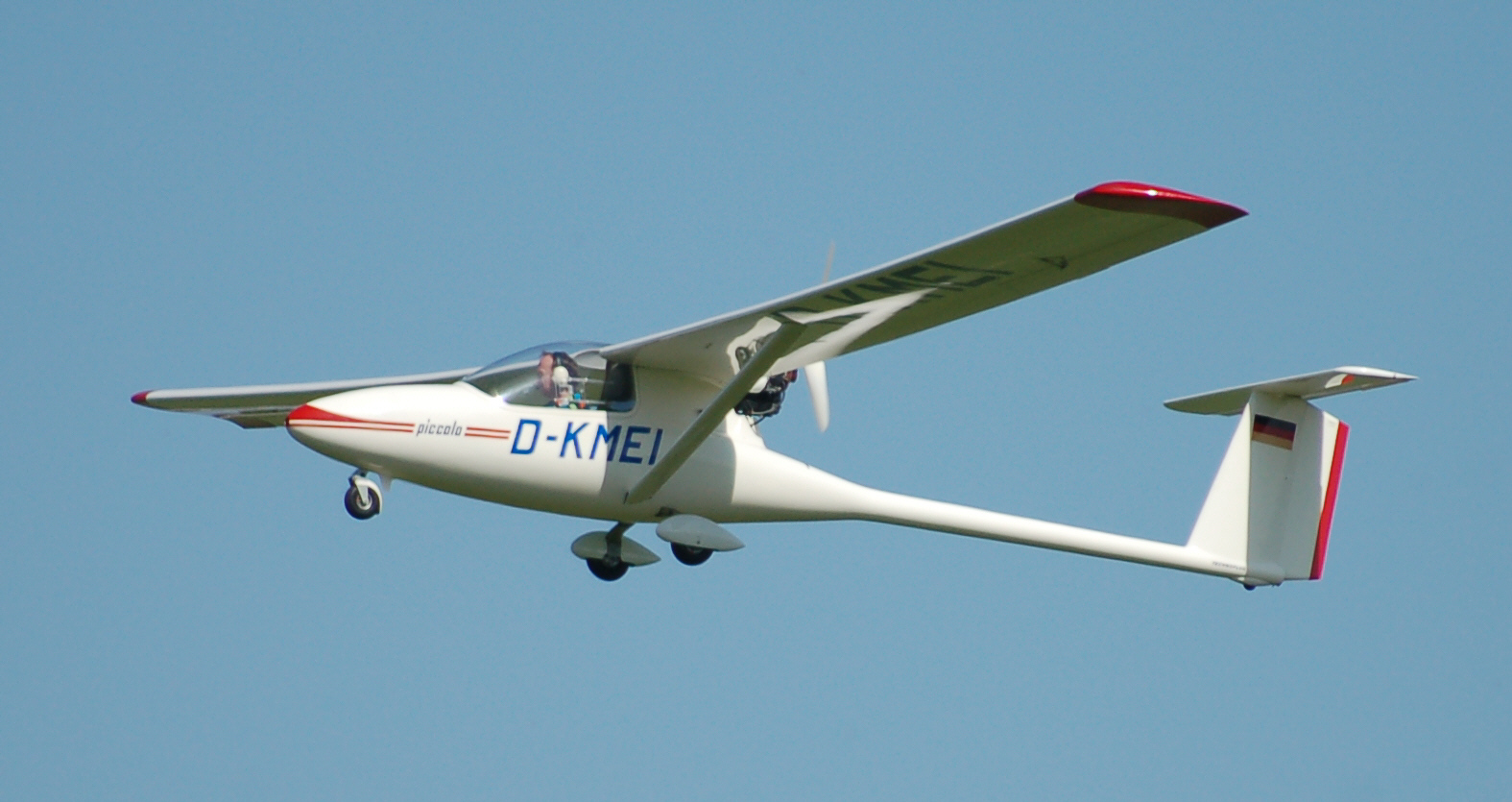

General information
- Type: Motor glider
- National origin: Germany
- Manufacturer: Technoflug
- Status: in production
- Number built: 120

History
- First flight: 1980

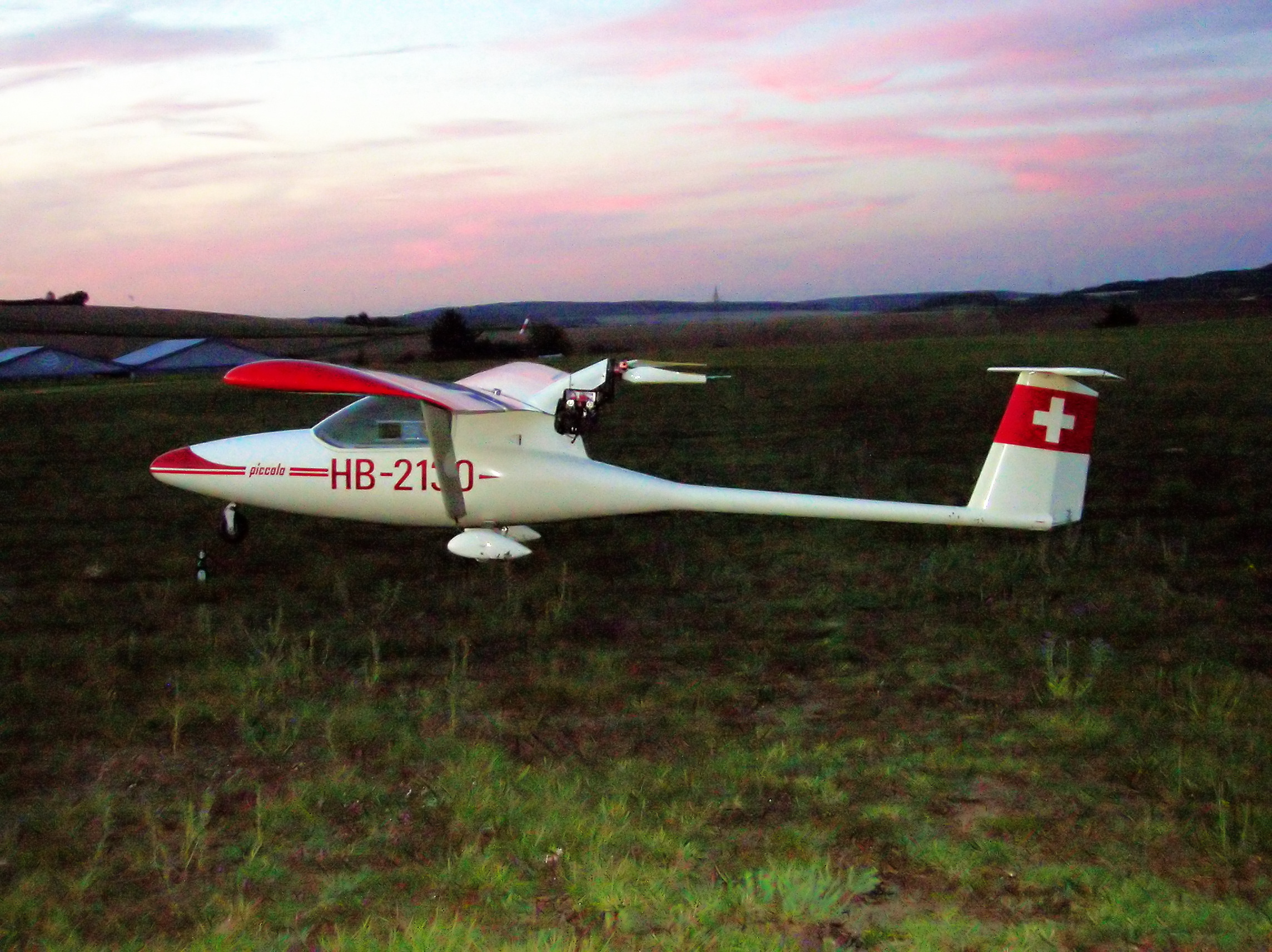
Technoflug Piccolo

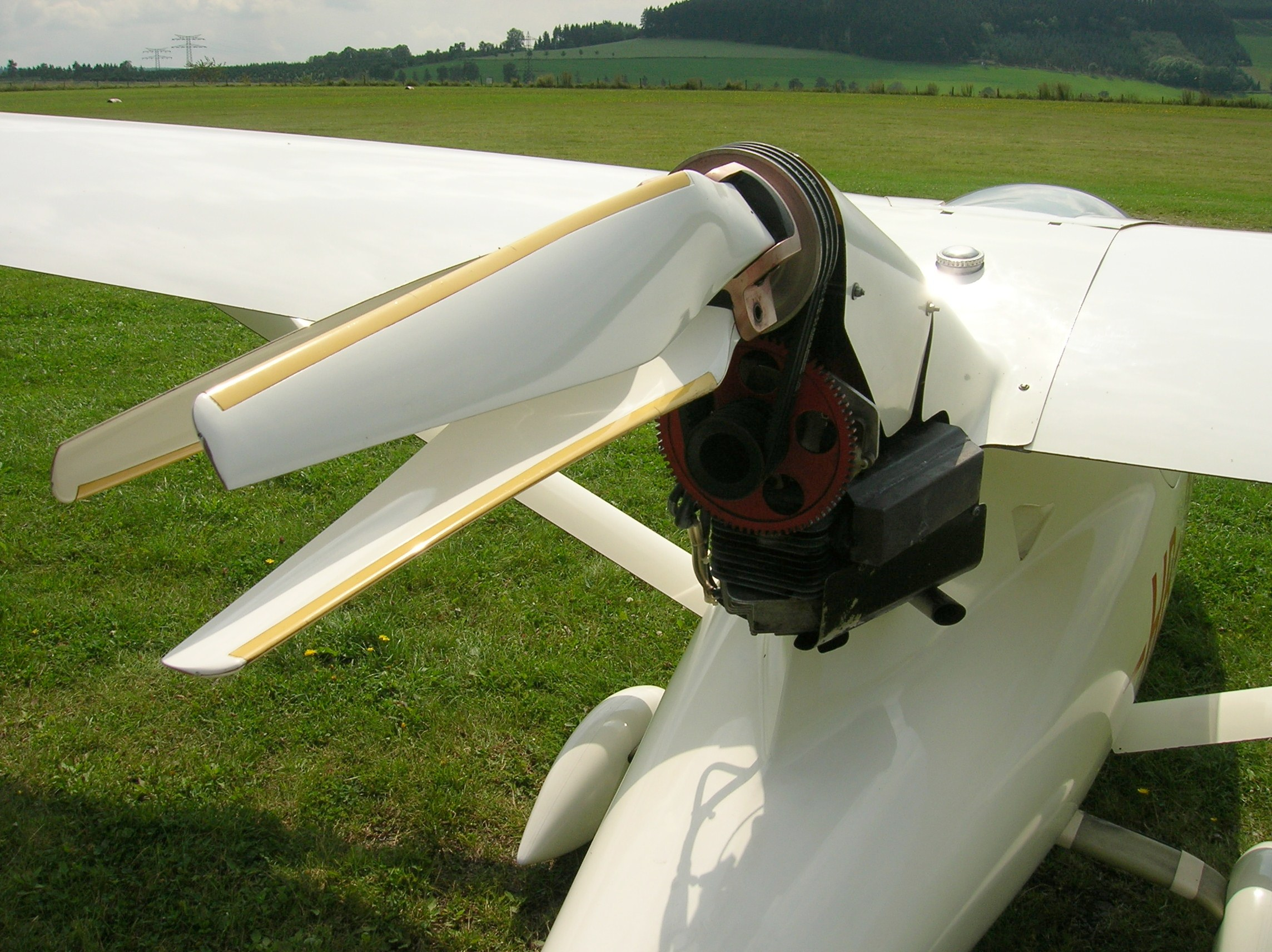
Technoflug Piccolo showing folding three-bladed propeller

The Technoflug Piccolo is a German high-wing, T-tailed, single-seat motor glider that was designed and produced by Technoflug of Schramberg. It first flew in 1980.

== Design and development ==
The Piccolo motorglider was the company's premier product, followed up by the Technoflug Carat, a touring motorglider.

The Piccolo is built from composites. The pusher configuration engine is mounted behind the cockpit and above the tail boom. The propeller is a three-bladed design which folds by aerodynamic drag for soaring flight, extending by centrifugal effect on engine start. The landing gear is of tricycle configuration and features optional wheel pants to reduce drag. The 13.3 m (43.6 ft) span wing is strut-braced and gives the aircraft a 23:1 glide ratio at 70 km/h (43 mph). The wings fold for storage and ground transport.

When the Piccolo was available in 2003 the price was US$29,266 for a complete aircraft. The company no longer produces whole aircraft and now provides contracted parts manufacture, computer-aided design and engineering services to other companies.

== Specifications (Piccolo) ==
Data from World Directory of Leisure Aviation 2003-04

General characteristics

- Crew: one
- Wingspan: 13.3 m (43 ft 8 in)
- Wing area: 10.6 m^{2} (114 sq ft)
- Empty weight: 180 kg (397 lb)

Performance

- Never exceed speed: 150 km/h (93 mph, 81 kn)
- Maximum glide ratio: 23:1 at 70 km/h (43 mph)
- Rate of sink: 0.9 m/s (180 ft/min)

== See also ==
- List of gliders
