= Tessier Biplane =

Single place homebuilt biplane

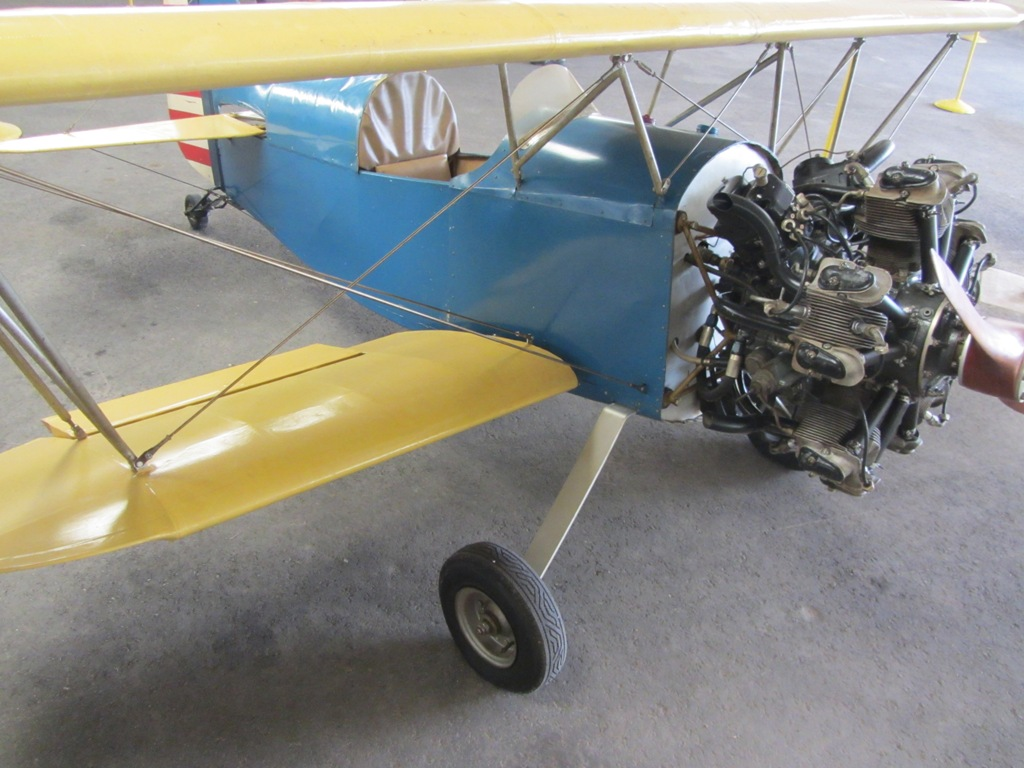

General information
- Type: Homebuilt aircraft
- National origin: United States
- Designer: Rene Tessier

History
- Introduction date: 1963

The Tessier Biplane is a single place homebuilt biplane.

== Development ==
The Tessier biplane is a single place tube and fabric construction aircraft with conventional landing gear. The wing spar is wood and ribs are plywood. The original engine was a Volkswagen air-cooled engine which was replaced with a Lawrance L-5 radial engine.

== Aircraft on display ==
The original Tessier Biplane belongs to the EAA AirVenture Museum, but is neither airworthy nor on display.

== Specifications (Tessier Biplane) ==
Data from EAA

General characteristics

- Crew: 1
- Powerplant: 1 × Lawrance Aero Engine Company L-5 Five cylinder radial engine
- Propellers: 2-bladed

Performance

== See also ==
Aircraft of comparable role, configuration, and era

- Smith Miniplane
