= Team Tango Tango 2 =

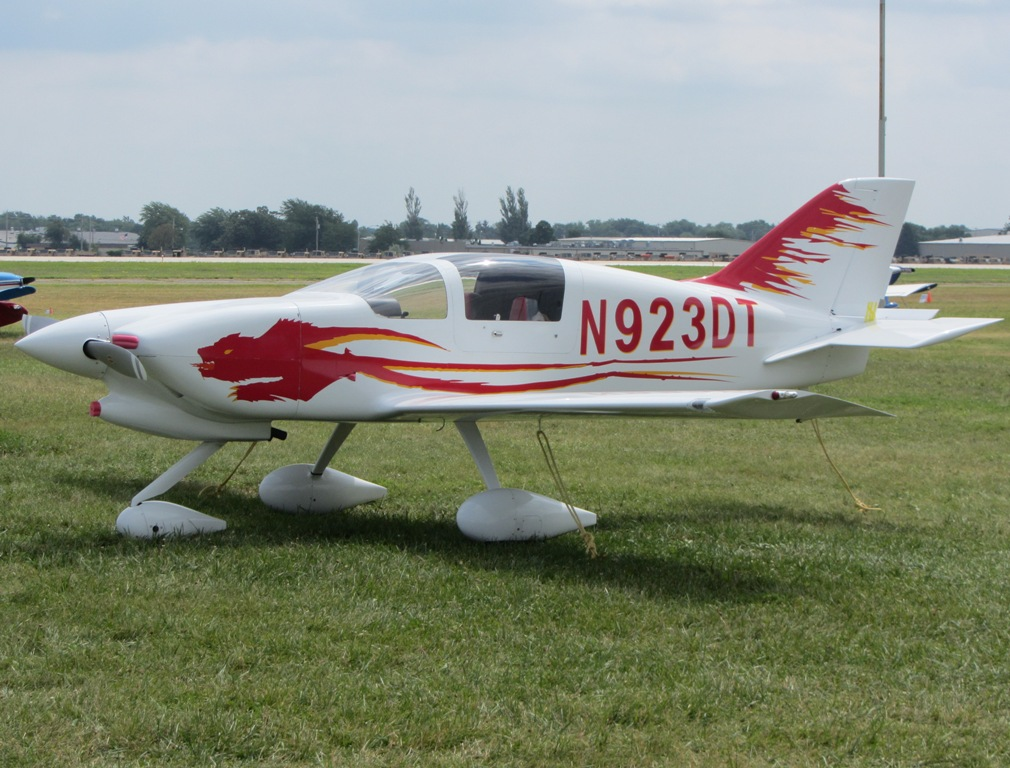

General information
- Type: Homebuilt aircraft
- National origin: United States of America
- Manufacturer: Team Tango
- Number built: 18 (Tango 2, Dec 2013); 1 (Tango XR, Dec 2011)

History
- First flight: 1996
- Variant: Team Tango Foxtrot

The Team Tango Tango 2 is an American low-wing composite homebuilt aircraft, marketed as a kit for amateur construction by Team Tango of Williston, Florida.

== Design and development ==
The Tango 2 was developed from the 1983 Aero Mirage TC-2 design. The Tango 2 is a side-by-side two-seat composite aircraft that can be flying in as little as 1000 hours of build time. Current aircraft have been built with engines ranging from the 150 HP O-320 Lycoming to the Geared Drives 205 hp EcoTech 2.2 liter supercharged Cobalt SS power package, with the most popular the 180 hp IO-360 Lycoming. Cruise speeds run from 170 knots with the 150 hp/fixed pitch combo to 195 knots on a 200 hp Lycoming equipped with a constant speed prop. Both the fuselage and the main wing and horizontal spars are molded as single pieces for exceptional strength and ease of building. With the XR version it is possible to fly from coast to coast, non-stop, on a west-to-east route.

The design was further developed into a four-seat aircraft, the Team Tango Foxtrot.

== Variants ==
Tango 2
Base model
Tango XR
Extended range aircraft with 90 gallon wet wing fuel tanks.

== Specifications (Tango 2) ==
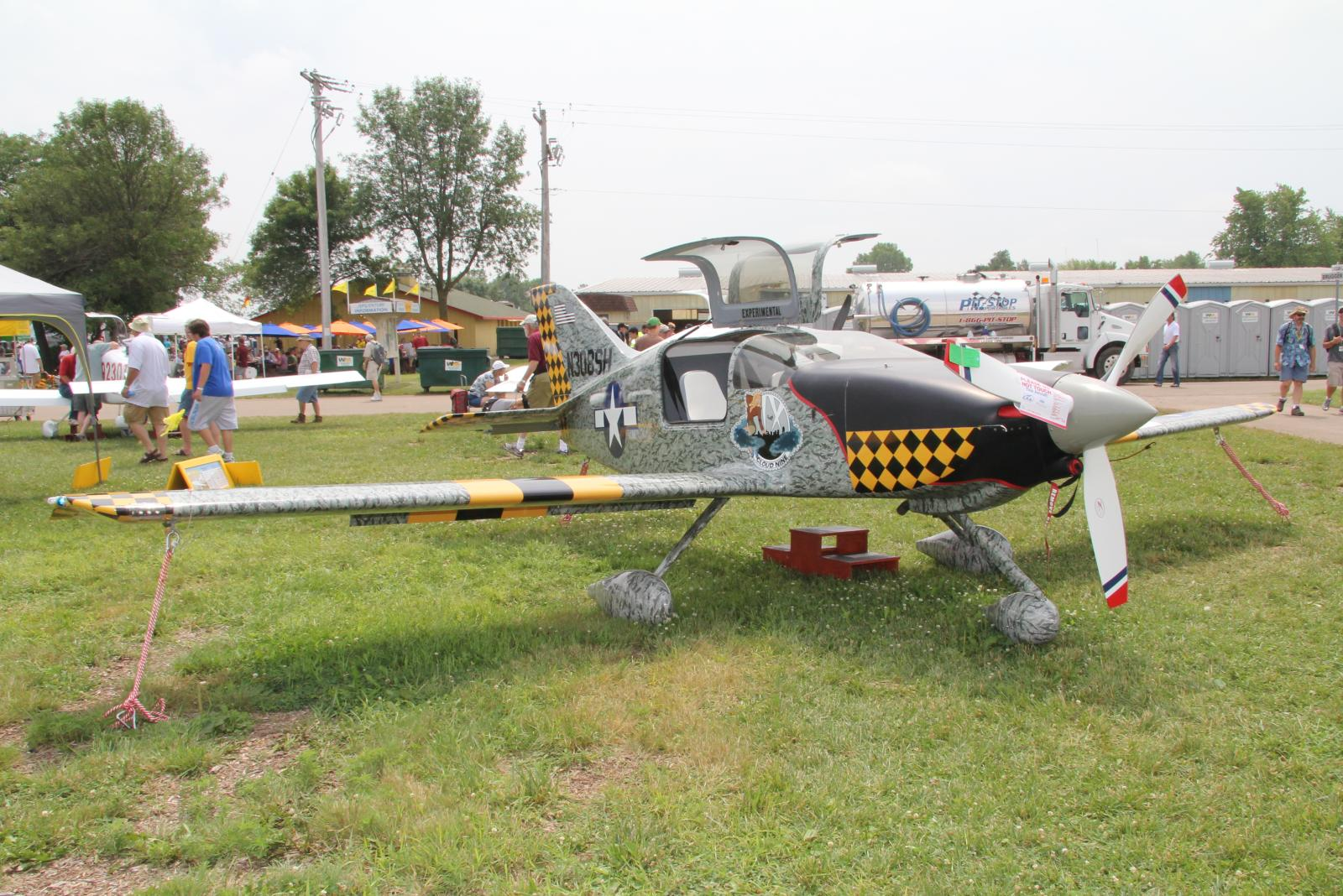
Tango 2 at EAA AirVenture 2011

Data from Team Tango

General characteristics

- Capacity: 2
- Length: 20 ft 7 in (6.27 m)
- Wingspan: 26 ft (7.9 m)
- Height: 6.75 ft (2.06 m)
- Wing area: 78 sq ft (7.2 m^{2})
- Empty weight: 1,150 lb (522 kg)
- Gross weight: 2,000 lb (907 kg)
- Fuel capacity: 58 gal
- Powerplant: 1 × Lycoming IO-360 four cylinder, air-cooled, four stroke aircraft engine, 180 hp (130 kW)

Performance

- Maximum speed: 184 kn (212 mph, 341 km/h)
- Cruise speed: 180 kn (210 mph, 340 km/h)
- Stall speed: 51 kn (59 mph, 95 km/h)
- Never exceed speed: 200 kn (230 mph, 370 km/h)
- Range: 1,250 nmi (1,440 mi, 2,320 km)

== See also ==
Aircraft of comparable role, configuration, and era

- Glasair I
