= Tecma Sport =

French aircraft manufacturer

- Company type: Privately held company
- Industry: Aerospace
- Founded: circa 1982
- Headquarters: Saint-Pierre-en-Faucigny, France
- Products: Hang gliders, paragliders, ultralight trikes
- Website: www.tecma-sport.com

Tecma Sport is a French aircraft manufacturer based in Saint-Pierre-en-Faucigny and formerly in La Roche-sur-Foron. The company specializes in the design and manufacture of hang gliders and paragliders in the form of ready-to-fly aircraft. The company also makes ultralight trikes and hang glider harnesses.

The company seems to have been founded about 1982, when it produced the Tecma Mirage and Tecma Spirale hang glider models.

The company produces a wide range of hang gliders, including the Tecma F1 Tempo series and Tecma FX in the mid-2000s. The two-place Tecma Medium has been in production since 1985.

== Aircraft ==
Summary of aircraft built by Tecma Sport
Model name	First flight	Number built	Type
Tecma Boomerang	1988		Hang glider
Tecma Colt	1986		Hang glider
Tecma F1	1992		Hang glider
Tecma F1 Evolution	1994		Hang glider
Tecma F1 Tempo			Hang glider
Tecma FX			Hang glider
Tecma Ixbo	1998		Hang glider
Tecma Mambo	1994		Hang glider
Tecma Medil	1992		Two place hang glider
Tecma Medium	1985		Two place hang glider
Tecma Mirage	1982		Hang glider
Tecma Nimbus	2005		Hang glider
Tecma Nuage	1987		Hang glider
Tecma Spirale	1982		Hang glider
Tecma Sport 2			Hang glider
Tecma T2			Hang glider supplied by Wills Wing
Tecma U2			Hang glider supplied by Wills Wing
Tecma Aloha			paraglider
Tecma Dolpo			paraglider
Tecma Klipo			Ultralight trike
