= Team Tango Foxtrot =

American homebuilt aircraft

Foxtrot
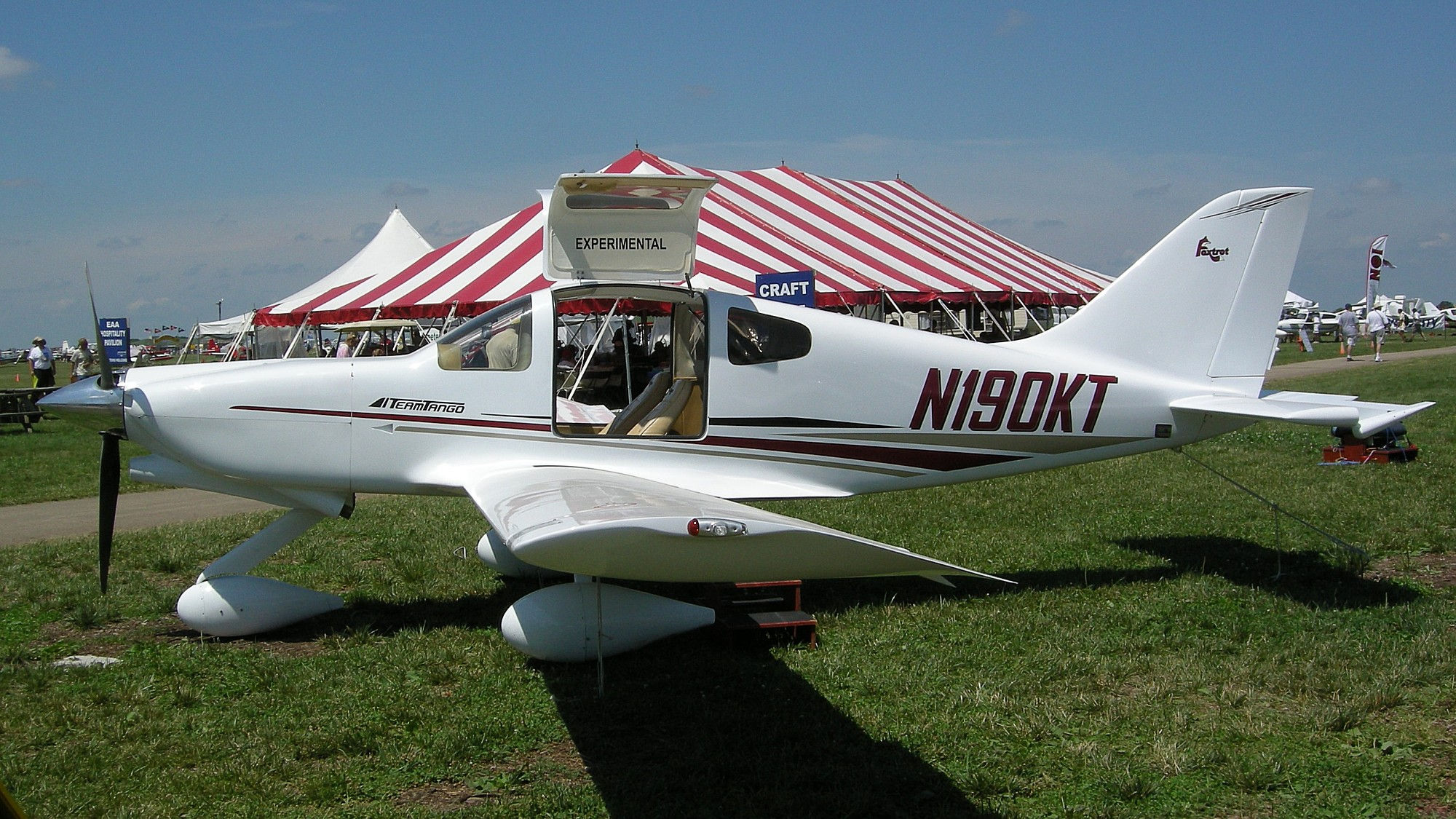

General information
- Type: Amateur-built aircraft
- National origin: United States
- Manufacturer: Team Tango
- Status: In production (2012)
- Number built: 3 (2011)

History
- Developed from: Team Tango Tango 2

The Team Tango Foxtrot, or Foxtrot 4, is an American amateur-built aircraft, designed and produced by Team Tango of Williston, Florida. The aircraft is supplied as a kit for amateur construction, with or without factory builder assistance.

== Design and development ==
The Foxtrot was developed as a four-seat version of the Tango 2 and shares many of the two-seater's features. The Foxtrot has a cantilever low-wing, a four-seat enclosed cockpit, fixed tricycle landing gear and a single engine in tractor configuration. The rear seats have limited visibility.

The aircraft is made from composites. Its 32 ft (9.8 m) span wing employs a NACA 64-415 airfoil, has an area of 128 sq ft (11.9 m^{2}) and mounts flaps. The engines recommended are Lycoming Engines of 200 to 350 hp (149 to 261 kW).

== Operational history ==
By October 2012 three examples had been registered in the United States with the Federal Aviation Administration.

== Specifications (Foxtrot) ==
Data from Bayerl

General characteristics

- Crew: one
- Capacity: three passenger
- Wingspan: 32 ft 0 in (9.75 m)
- Wing area: 128 sq ft (11.9 m^{2})
- Airfoil: NACA 64-415
- Empty weight: 1,398 lb (634 kg)
- Gross weight: 2,579 lb (1,170 kg)
- Fuel capacity: 110 U.S. gallons (420 L; 92 imp gal)
- Powerplant: 1 × Lycoming O-540 six cylinder, air-cooled, four stroke aircraft engine, 350 hp (260 kW)
- Propellers: 3-bladed constant speed

Performance

- Maximum speed: 229 mph (368 km/h, 199 kn)
- Cruise speed: 216 mph (348 km/h, 188 kn)
- Stall speed: 57 mph (92 km/h, 50 kn)
- Rate of climb: 2,400 ft/min (12 m/s)
- Wing loading: 20.1 lb/sq ft (98.3 kg/m^{2})
