= Tecnam P-Jet =

Light jet aircraft under development

P-Jet

General information
- Type: Light jet
- National origin: Italy
- Manufacturer: Tecnam
- Status: In development

The Tecnam P-Jet is an Italian light turbofan aircraft in development by Tecnam.

== Design and development ==
The P-Jet, under development to be used as a light military trainer or reconnaissance aircraft, is a side-by-side single engine turbofan aircraft with retractable tricycle landing gear and a twin rudder arrangement.

== Specifications (P-Jet) ==
Data from AVWEEK

General characteristics

- Crew: 2
- Wingspan: 8.5 m (28 ft)
- Powerplant: 1 × Podded turbofan

Performance
