= Tatiná =

- Municipality
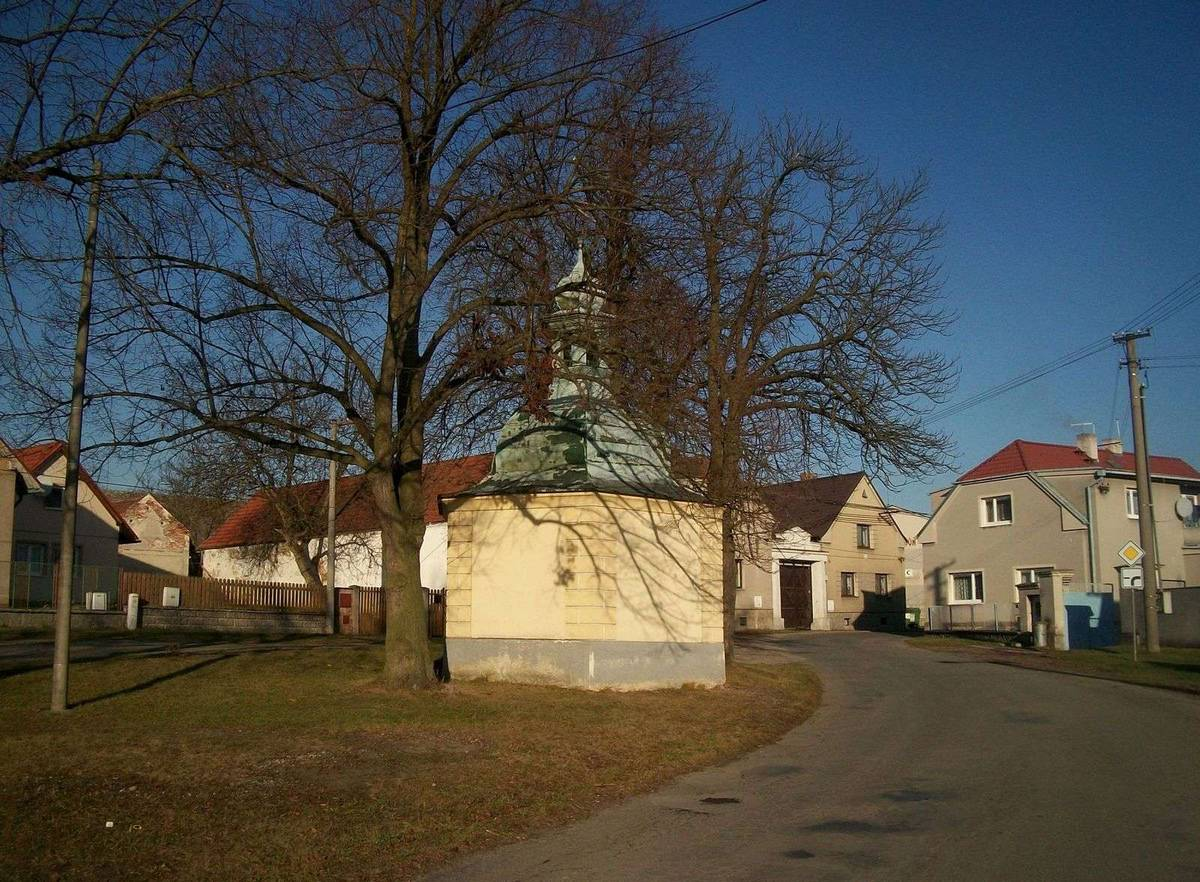
- Chapel

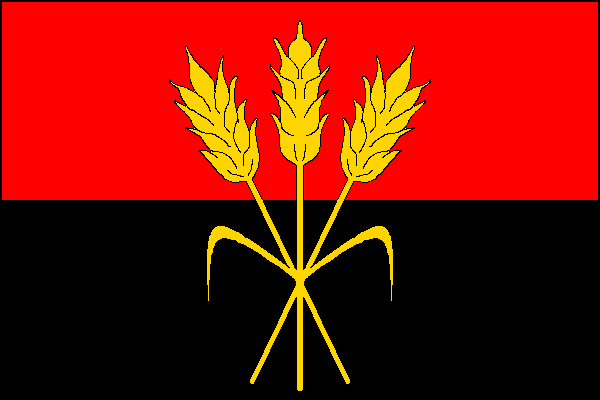
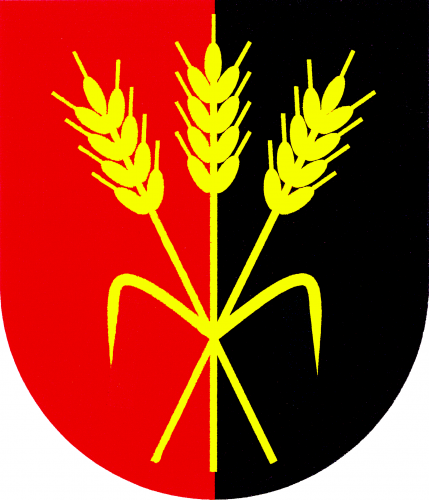
- Flag Coat of arms

- Location in the Czech Republic
- Coordinates: 49°50′55″N 13°17′59″E
- Country: Czech Republic
- Region: Plzeň
- District: Plzeň-North
- First mentioned: 1379

Area
  - Total: 4.40 km^{2} (1.70 sq mi)
- Elevation: 437 m (1,434 ft)

Population (2026-01-01)
  - Total: 237
  - Density: 53.9/km^{2} (140/sq mi)
- Time zone: UTC+1 (CET)
  - Summer (DST): UTC+2 (CEST)
- Postal code: 330 11
- Website: www.tatina.cz

Tatiná is a municipality and village in Plzeň-North District in the Plzeň Region of the Czech Republic. It has about 200 inhabitants.

Tatiná lies approximately 13 kilometres (8 mi) north-west of Plzeň and 85 km (53 mi) west of Prague.

== Demographics ==
Historical population
| Year | Pop. | ±% |
|---|---|---|
| 1869 | 185 | — |
| 1880 | 187 | +1.1% |
| 1890 | 229 | +22.5% |
| 1900 | 240 | +4.8% |
| 1910 | 300 | +25.0% |
| 1921 | 307 | +2.3% |
| 1930 | 293 | −4.6% |
| 1950 | 245 | −16.4% |
| 1961 | 262 | +6.9% |
| 1970 | 244 | −6.9% |
| 1980 | 231 | −5.3% |
| 1991 | 212 | −8.2% |
| 2001 | 223 | +5.2% |
| 2011 | 236 | +5.8% |
| 2021 | 248 | +5.1% |
Source: Censuses
