= Tellier T.3 =

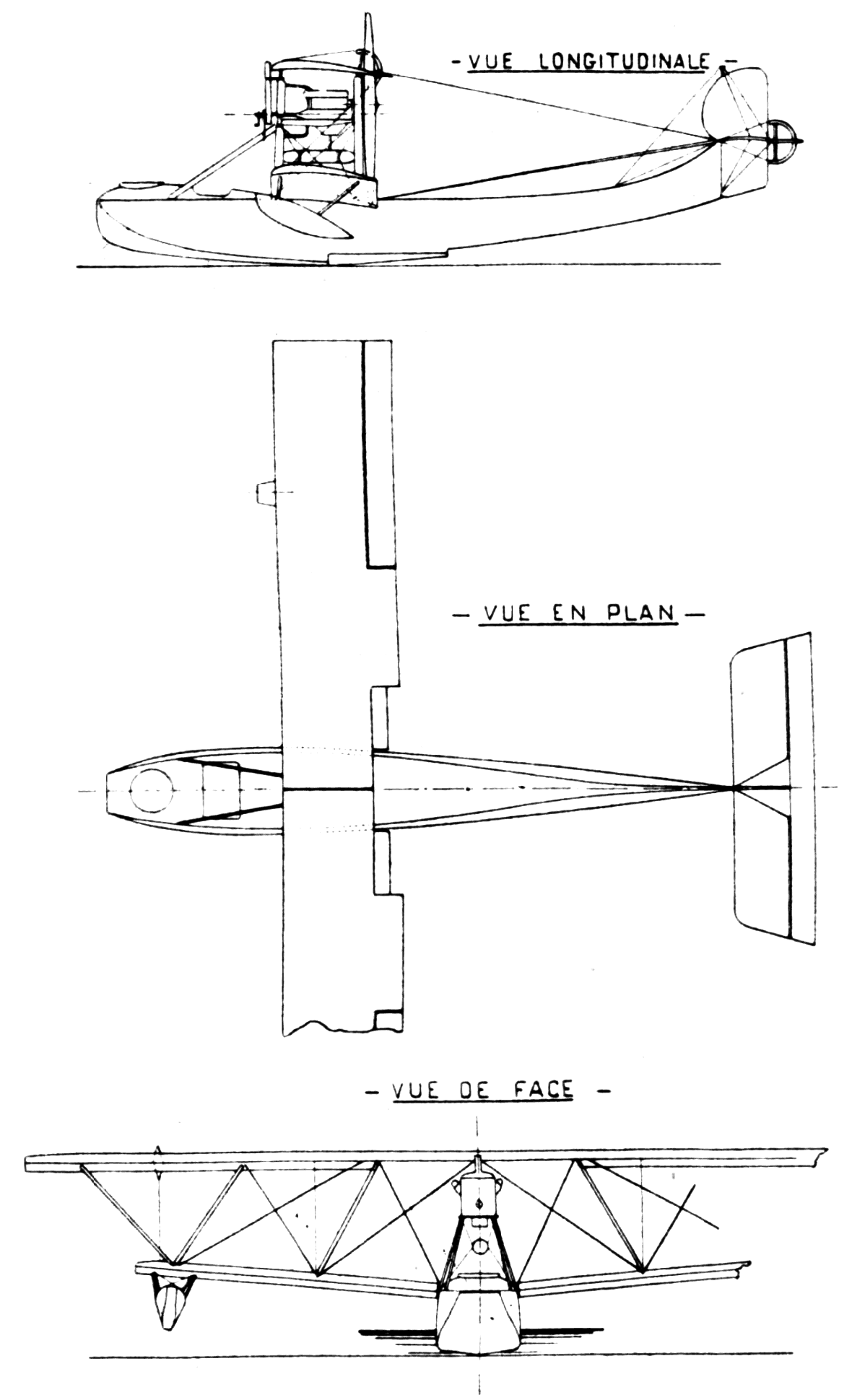

General information
- Type: Patrol flying-boat
- National origin: France
- Manufacturer: Société Alphonse Tellier et Cie à Neuilly (Tellier) / Société Anonyme des Établissements Nieuport (Nieuport)
- Designer: Alphonse Tellier
- Primary user: French Naval Aviation
- Number built: ~100 T.3 + 55 T.c.6

History
- First flight: 1917
- Developed from: Tellier T.2
- Developed into: Tellier T.6

The Tellier T.3 was a French two-seat patrol biplane flying-boat designed and built by Société Alphonse Tellier et Cie à Neuilly (Tellier) and also produced by Société Anonyme des Établissements Nieuport (Nieuport).

== Design and development ==
Based on the earlier Tellier T.2 the T.3 was a two-bay, unequal-span biplane flying boat powered by a 200 hp (149 kW) Hispano-Suiza 8Ac engine in pusher configuration, with the pilot sitting ahead of the engine and the gunner/observer in the nose with a forward-facing Vickers machine gun.

Following test flights by both the Aviation Militaire and the Aéronavale, the Aéronavale ordered ten aircraft and the British Royal Naval Air Service (RNAS) ordered two for gun and camouflage trials at the Isle of Grain. A total of 100 aircraft were built, including 47 by Nieuport, who took over the assets of Tellier.

A development of the T.3 was armed with a cannon in the nose and was designated the T.c.6.

Production of two-seat Tellier T.3s was also carried out in Russia, but no aircraft were assembled. Ten Tellier T.3s were assembled from the wartime parts, in the nascent Soviet Union, at GAZ No.3 (GAZ - Gosudarstvenny Aviatsionnyy Zavod – state aviation plant/factory).

== Variants ==
T.3
Production aircraft built by Tellier and Nieport; Approx 190 T.3s were built, including ten in Russia / Soviet Union.

== Operators ==
France

- French Naval Aviation

United Kingdom

- Royal Naval Air Service

United States

- United States Navy (3 purchased)

== Specifications (T.3) ==
Data from British and Allied Aircraft Manufacturers of the First World War, French aircraft of the First World War

General characteristics

- Crew: 3
- Capacity: 560 kg (1,230 lb) payload
- Length: 11.83 m (38 ft 10 in)
- Wingspan: 15.6 m (51 ft 2 in)
- Height: 3.6 m (11 ft 10 in)
- Wing area: 47 m^{2} (510 sq ft)
- Empty weight: 1,150 kg (2,535 lb)
- Gross weight: 1,796 kg (3,960 lb)
- Powerplant: 1 × Hispano-Suiza 8Ac V-8 water-cooled piston engine, 150 kW (200 hp)
- Propellers: 2-bladed wooden fixedpitch pusher propeller

Performance

- Maximum speed: 130 km/h (81 mph, 70 kn) to 135 km/h (84 mph; 73 kn)
- Endurance: 4 hours 30 minutes
- Time to altitude: 500 m (1,600 ft) in 2 minutes 45 seconds

1,000 m (3,300 ft) in 6 minutes 30 seconds
1,500 m (4,900 ft) in 11 minutes 30 seconds
2,000 m (6,600 ft) in 15 minutes 30 seconds
2,500 m (8,200 ft) in 24 minutes

Armament

- Guns: 1× forward-facing 0.303 in (7.70 mm) Vickers machine gun
- Bombs: 2x 35 kg (77 lb) bombs

== Bibliography ==
- Kotelnikov, V.; Kulikov, V. & Cony, C. (December 2001). "Les avions français en URSS, 1921–1941" [French Aircraft in the USSR, 1921–1941]. Avions: Toute l'Aéronautique et son histoire (in French) (105): 50–56. ISSN 1243-8650.
