= Octans Aircraft =

Airplane manufacturer in the Brazil

- Company type: Private
- Industry: Aerospace
- Predecessor: Octans Aircraft; INPAER; Aerogard
- Founded: 2017
- Headquarters: São João da Boa Vista, São Paulo, Brazil
- Key people: Milton Roberto Pereira (CEO)
- Products: Airplanes
- Website: http://www.octansaircraft.com/

Octans Aircraft is a Brazilian manufacturer of light aircraft, located at São João da Boa Vista, São Paulo.

== History ==
The origins of Octans Aircraft date to 2002, when INPAER (Portuguese: Indústria Paulista de Aeronáutica) was founded as a light aircraft manufacturer, producing more than 240 light sport aircraft. In 2013, banker Milton Roberto Pereira bought a third of the shares in the company and focused the company on the type certified aircraft market. Investments resulted in the modernisation of the company's plant and adopting Siemens Digital Industries Software to speed product development and certification.

Following the restructuring in 2017, the company was renamed Octans Aircraft and a new light aircraft project was announced, the 300A. It was later renamed the Octans Cygnus. In early 2018, Octans Aircraft announced that it has sold INPAER's previous design rights to a former owner. The first Cygnus prototype was completed and the National Civil Aviation Agency of Brazil certification process commenced, with deliveries forecast for the second half of 2021.

== Aircraft ==
Summary of aircraft built by Octans Aircraft
Model name	First flight	Number built	Type
Cygnus	2020	1	Piston

== See also ==
- Aero Bravo
- Companhia Aeronáutica Paulista
- List of aircraft manufacturers
