= Trekking sarl =

French aircraft manufacturer

- Company type: Société à responsabilité limitée
- Industry: Aerospace
- Founded: 1976
- Founder: Axel de Neufville
- Headquarters: Lambesc, France
- Products: Paragliders, paramotors, four-wheel drive truck tents, luggage, photo and video accessories
- Website: trekking.fr

Trekking sarl is a French aircraft manufacturer based in Lambesc. The company specializes in the design and manufacture of paragliders and paramotor wings in the form of ready-to-fly aircraft. The company also produces four-wheel drive truck tents and travel luggage, as well as photo and video accessories.

The company was founded in 1976 by Axel de Neufville in Marseille. It is organized as a société à responsabilité limitée (sarl), a French private limited company.

== Divisions ==
Trekking Parapentes is the division that constructs paragliders and paramotoring wings and is based in Saint-Mathieu-de-Tréviers, although it was originally in Lambesc.

The division that makes travel luggage, money belts and accessories is based in Lambesc.

The division that makes truck-top tents for four-wheel drive trucks is based in Saint-Cannat.

== Aircraft ==
Summary of aircraft built by Trekking:

- Trekking B-Bus
- Trekking Carver
- Trekking Elise
- Trekking Just One
- Trekking K2
- Trekking Sebring
- Trekking Senso
- Trekking Sport
- Trekking Trek
- Trekking Xenos
