= Tecnam Astore =

Italian sport aircraft

Astore
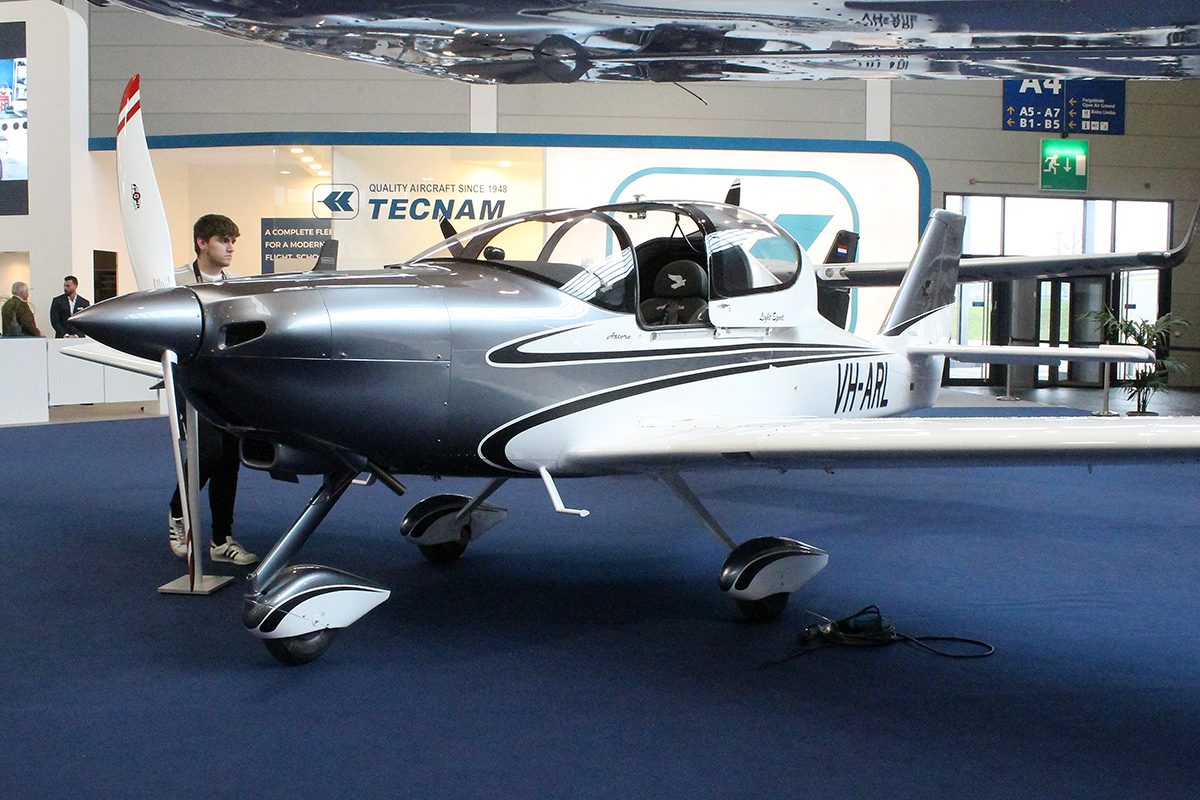
- Prototype Astore

General information
- Type: Light-sport aircraft
- National origin: Italy
- Manufacturer: Tecnam
- Designer: Luigi Pascale
- Status: In production
- Number built: 30 (2014)

History
- Manufactured: 2013-present
- First flight: June 2013

The Tecnam Astore (English: Goshawk) is an Italian, low wing, two-seater, light-sport aircraft, under development by Tecnam of Naples. It was first flown in early June, 2013, and introduced at the AERO Friedrichshafen show in 2013. It is supplied complete and ready-to-fly.

The Astore replaced the Tecnam P2002 Sierra in ultralight production, although not the certified P2002JF model.

== Design and development ==
The aircraft was designed to comply with the US Light Sport Aircraft (LSA) rules. It features a cantilever low-wing, two seats in side-by-side configuration, an enclosed cockpit under a bubble canopy, fixed tricycle landing gear with wheel pants and a single engine in tractor configuration.

The aircraft is made from aluminum sheet. Its wing has a span of 8.65 m (28.4 ft) and is equipped with flaps. Standard engines available are the 100 hp (75 kW) Rotax 912ULS and 912iULS, plus the 115 hp (86 kW) Rotax 914 four-stroke powerplants.

The Astore achieved its FAA LSA compliance in April 2014. More than thirty had been delivered by September 2014.

== Operational history ==
Reviewer Marino Boric described the design in a 2015 review as "beautiful".

== Specifications (Astore) ==
Data from AOPA, Pew and Tecnam

General characteristics

- Crew: one
- Capacity: one passenger
- Length: 7 m (23 ft 0 in)
- Wingspan: 8.65 m (28 ft 5 in)
- Height: 2.3 m (7 ft 7 in)
- Wing area: 12.2 m^{2} (131 sq ft)
- Gross weight: 600 kg (1,323 lb)
- Fuel capacity: 110 litres (24 imp gal; 29 US gal) in two tanks of 55 litres (12 imp gal; 15 US gal) each
- Powerplant: 1 × Rotax 912ULS four cylinder, liquid and air-cooled, four stroke aircraft engine, 75 kW (101 hp)
- Propellers: 2-bladed fixed pitch

Performance

- Maximum speed: 244 km/h (152 mph, 135 kn)
- Stall speed: 65 km/h (40 mph, 35 kn) flaps down
- Never exceed speed: 280 km/h (170 mph, 150 kn)
- Service ceiling: 4,572 m (15,000 ft)
- g limits: +4/-2
- Rate of climb: 6.1 m/s (1,200 ft/min)

Avionics

- Dual Dynon SkyView multi-function displays
- iPad mini
- Levil AHRS G-mini, with 3D synthetic vision and terrain awareness

== See also ==
- Partenavia Astore Design by Luigi Pascale
