= Texas Aircraft Colt =

American light aircraft

Colt
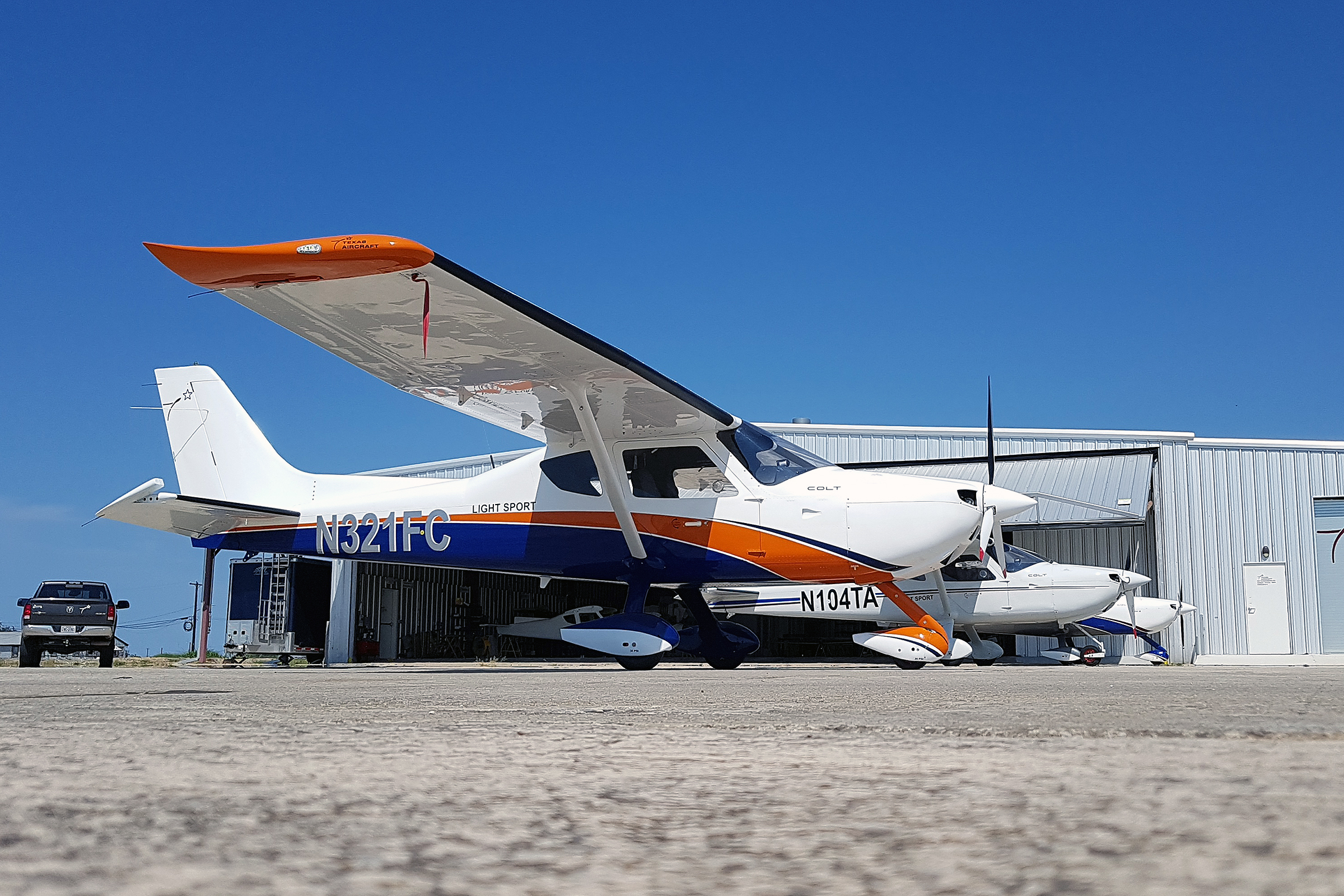

General information
- Type: Light-sport aircraft
- National origin: United States
- Manufacturer: Texas Aircraft Manufacturing
- Designer: Caio Jordão
- Status: In production
- Number built: 7

History
- Manufactured: 2019-present
- Introduction date: July 2019
- First flight: 2018
- Developed from: INPAER Conquest 180

The Texas Aircraft Colt is an American light-sport aircraft built by Texas Aircraft Manufacturing, a company headed by Brazilian Matheus Grande.

Designed by the Brazilian Caio Jordão, the Colt was publicly introduced at AirVenture, in Oshkosh, Wisconsin in July 2019. The aircraft is supplied ready-to-fly.

The design first flew in 2018 and met the ASTM standards as a light-sport aircraft in September 2019. The first customer delivery was in January 2020.

== Design and development ==
The aircraft is based upon the Brazilian Jordão-designed INPAER Conquest 180, developed to comply with the US light-sport aircraft rules. It features a strut-braced high-wing with flaps, a two-seats-in-side-by-side configuration enclosed cockpit accessed by doors, fixed tricycle landing gear with wheel pants and a single engine in tractor configuration.

The aircraft is made with a welded 4130 steel tubing cockpit cage, with the rest of the airframe aluminum construction, covered in aluminum sheet. The Colt has yoke controls, four point harnesses, a Galaxy GRS 6/600 SD Speedy ballistic parachute and a basic glass cockpit. The standard engine used is the 100 hp (75 kW) Rotax 912ULS four-stroke powerplant.

In September 2019 the type completed ASTM testing to qualify for the US light-sport category, and is listed as the "Colt 100" on the Federal Aviation Administration's list of approved special light-sport aircraft.

The company plans to build six to eight aircraft in 2019 and 24 during 2020, at its plant at South Texas Regional Airport in Hondo, Texas. The plant was officially opened in February 2019 and employs many ex-U.S. military aircraft maintenance personal to build the aircraft. Prices have not been announced, but sales are to start in July 2019.

In July 2020 the company announced that it was developing an electric aircraft variant. The eColt will be powered by lithium-sulfur batteries and will have a greater than two-hour endurance, giving a range of 200 nmi (370 km).

In August 2020 the manufacturer announced that the aircraft would be available as the "entry-level Colt", with the Garmin G3X Touch EFIS and Garmin GTN 650 GPS/NAV/COMM/MFD, in response to demand from flight schools that want to use the aircraft for flight training. This model was introduced in November 2020 and includes other cost saving measures, including analog instruments on the right (instructor's) side of the instrument panel, synthetic leather upholstery, an exterior white painted finish with no graphics, plus toe brakes only on the left (pilot) side.

== Operational history ==
The first customer aircraft was delivered to a private owner in January 2020.

In a flight review in February 2020 AVweb's Paul Bertorelli praised the aircraft's handling and cabin ergonomics once seated. He faulted the cabin entrance size, however, writing, "the problem is getting in because the door has an upper sill that forces you to duck to ingress. It proved only a slight problem for my 5-ft. 8-in. frame, but taller pilots or those long of torso may struggle." He also noted the design's limited useful load, "at 836 pounds empty, the Colt has 484 pounds of useful load. That’s two 200-pounders and 14 gallons of gas. That’s fine for a training flight, but not so fine for cross- country flying where you might also wish to carry some baggage. So if you carry full fuel, the people better not weigh more than 300 pounds total." Of the design overall he concluded, "the Colt’s performance is workmanlike, but not exceptional. If it stands out at all, my view is that it’s a little airplane masquerading as a big one. The ergonomics are excellent and the handling is well sorted, especially if the airplane finds a home as a trainer. Teaching landings in it would be a blast."

== Specifications (Colt) ==
Data from Cook, Airframer, Flyer UK

General characteristics

- Crew: one
- Capacity: one passenger
- Powerplant: 1 × Rotax 912ULS four cylinder, liquid and air-cooled, four stroke aircraft engine, 101 hp (75 kW)
- Propellers: 3-bladed ground adjustable pitch

Performance

- Cruise speed: 110 kn (130 mph, 200 km/h)
- Stall speed: 38 kn (44 mph, 70 km/h)

== See also ==
- Texas Aircraft Stallion
