= Team Rocket F1 Rocket =

Type of aircraft

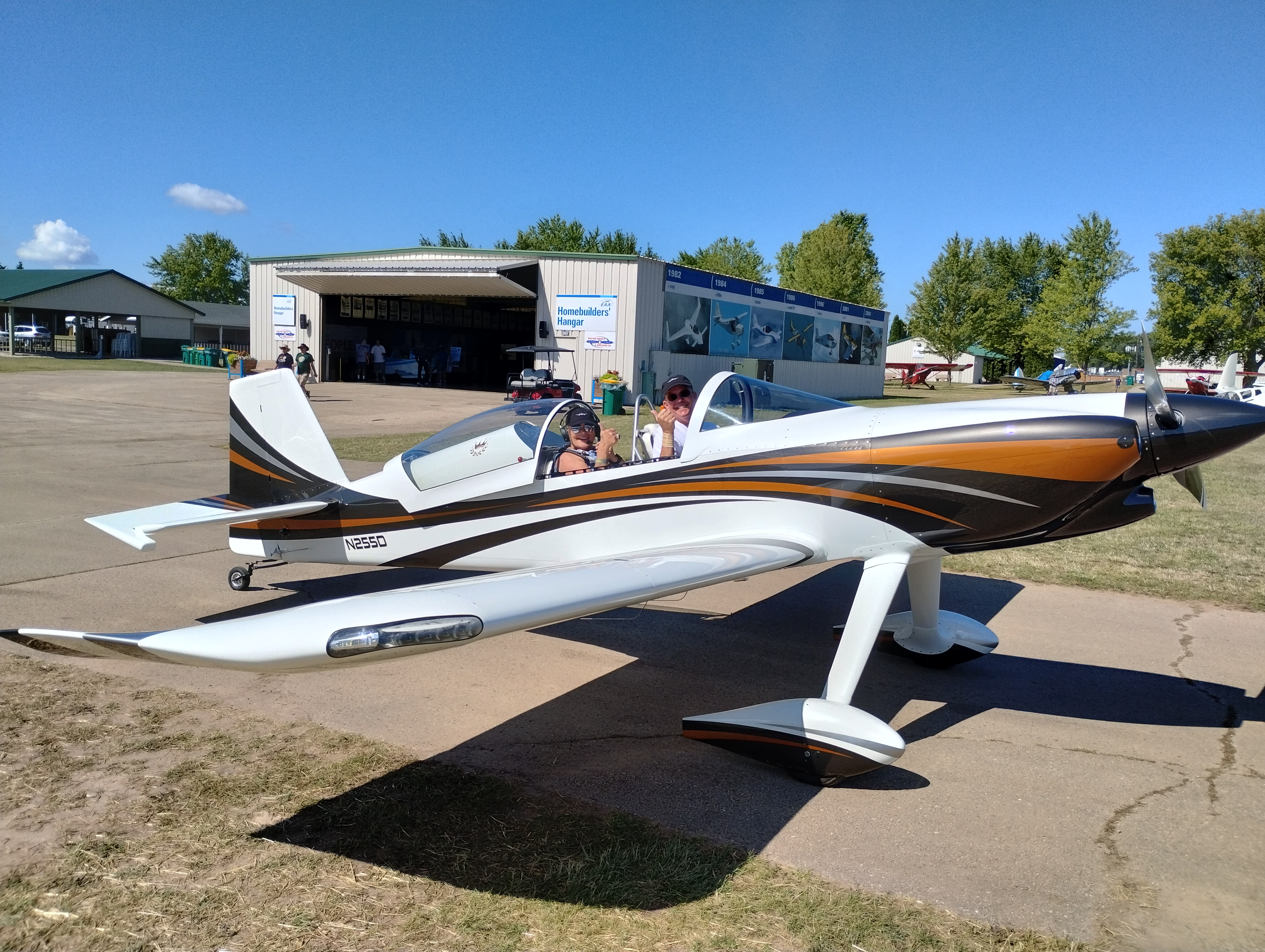
Darryl Hudec's 2023 Airventure Gold Lindy award winning F1 Rocket

The Team Rocket F1 Rocket is a two-seat sport plane formerly built in Czech Republic and marketed as a kit for amateur construction by Team Rocket of Texas, United States. Currently, the aircraft is being produced in the U.S. by Frazier Aviation Products LLC of Indiana.

== Development and design ==
The F1 Rocket is a tandem two-seat low-wing cantilever monoplane built mainly in aluminum. The Rocket has a titanium fixed conventional landing gear with a tailwheel. Designed to be built with a range of nose-mounted engines between 235 and 350 hp (175 and 224 kW) the prototype has a Lycoming IO-540 with a three-bladed propeller. The F1 has tandem seating for two with a rear-sliding canopy and a fixed windscreen. Tip up canopies are also used. The prototype first flew in the United States in November 2000 and by 2003 seven others had flown. By late 2017, over 130 had flown.

== Variants ==
F1 Rocket
Tandem-seat variant using a 6 cylinder Lycoming IO-540 or Continental IO-550 engine of 250-350 HP. The wing on the F1 is similar to the Vans RV-4 wing, a rectangular design with slotted ailerons, and bottom hinged flaps. The canopy may be a slider or flip over design, but most use the slider design.

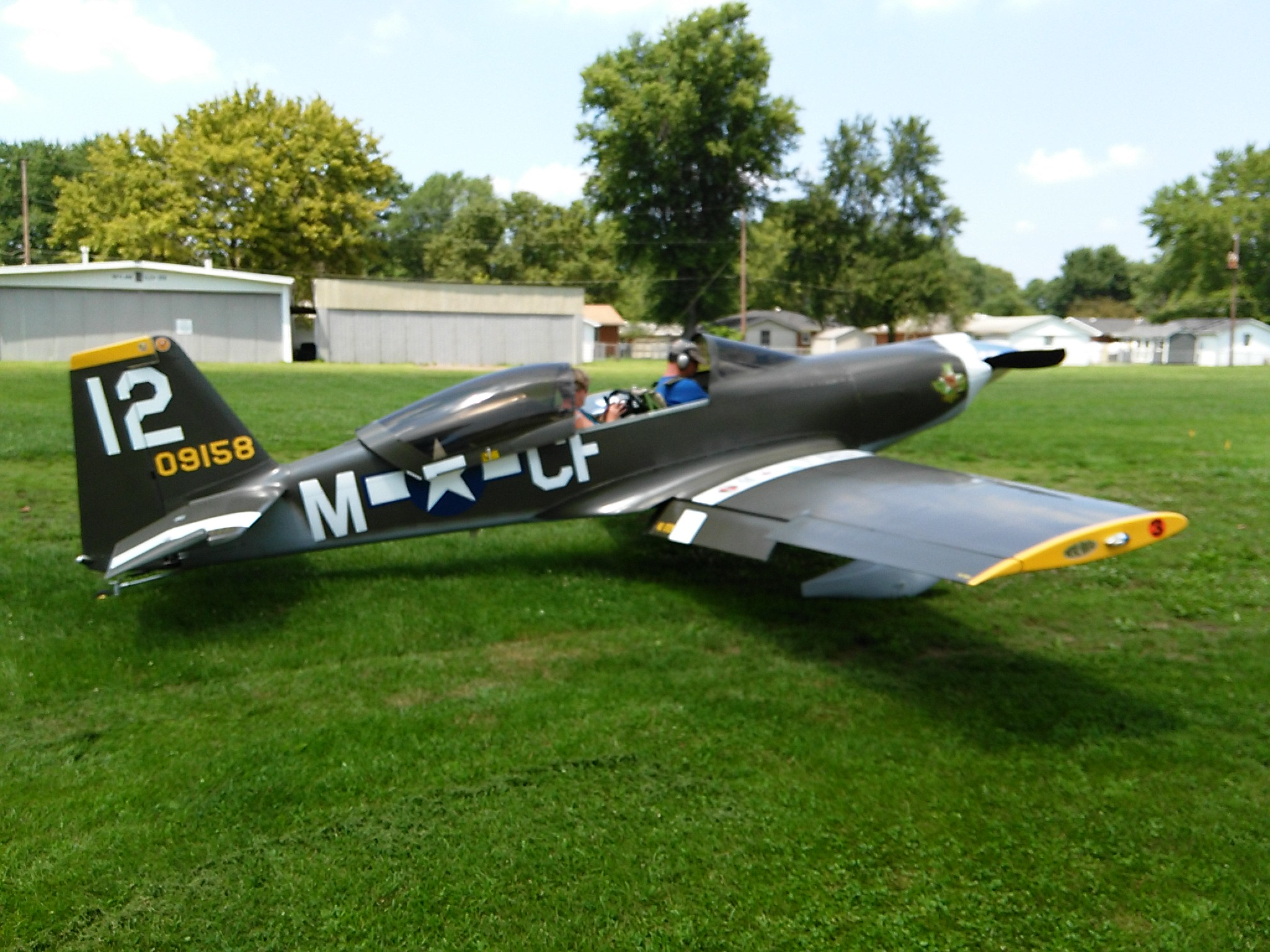
F1 Evo

F1 Evo
Evolutionary variant design, utilized a tapered wing as compared to the rectangular wing on the F1. Significant changes were made to the aileron and flap design. F1 Evo uses the same fuselage and tail as the original F1. The Evo wing is no longer available.

F4 Raider
Tandem-seat variant using a 4-cylinder Lycoming parallel valve engine, or clone, from 180 to 200+ HP.

F-wing variant

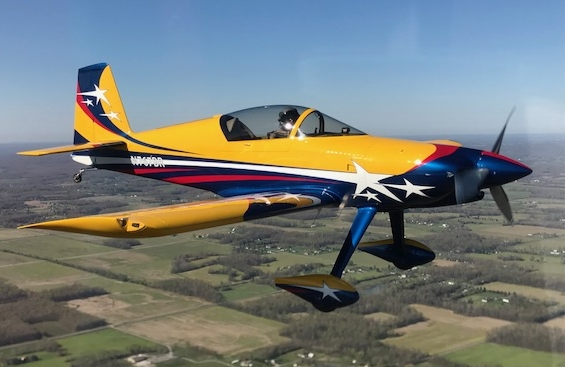
F4 Raider in flight

An entirely new tapered wing, tandem-seat variant using a 4 or 6 cylinder Lycoming parallel valve engine, is in the works . The first flight should occur in early 2025.

== Specifications (F1 Rocket) ==
Data from Jane's All the World's Aircraft 2003-04

General characteristics

- Crew: 2
- Length: 21 ft 0 in (6.40 m)
- Wingspan: 21 ft 6 in (6.56 m)
- Wing area: 106.0 sq ft (9.85 m^{2})
- Empty weight: 1,199 lb (544 kg)
- Max takeoff weight: 2,000 lb (907 kg)
- Powerplant: 1 × Lycoming IO-540 Flat-six piston engine, 260 hp (190 kW)
- Propellers: 3-bladed

Performance

- Maximum speed: 253 mph (407 km/h, 220 kn)
- Cruise speed: 230 mph (370 km/h, 200 kn) 75% Power
- Stall speed: 54 mph (87 km/h, 47 kn)
- Range: 1,150 mi (1,850 km, 1,000 nmi) 55% Power
- Rate of climb: 3,500 ft/min (18 m/s)
