= Wills Wing =

Hang glider manufacturer

Wills Wing Holding, Inc.
- Type: Privately held company
- Industry: Aerospace
- Predecessor: Sport Kites, Inc, Wills Wing, Inc
- Founded: 1973
- Founder: Chris Wills, Bob Wills
- Headquarters: Houston, Texas, United States
- Key people: Alistair Jeffery (Chairman), Rudy Gotes (CEO)
- Products: Hang gliders, hang glider harnesses
- Number of employees: 10+
- Website: www.willswing.org

Wills Wing is an aircraft manufacturer originally based in Orange, California. The company specializes in the design and manufacture of hang gliders in the form of ready-to-fly aircraft, plus hang glider harnesses and accessories.

The company was founded in 1973 by brothers Bob and Chris Wills.

The company sells a line of hang gliders including training and beginner gliders, intermediate and competition wings.

== History ==
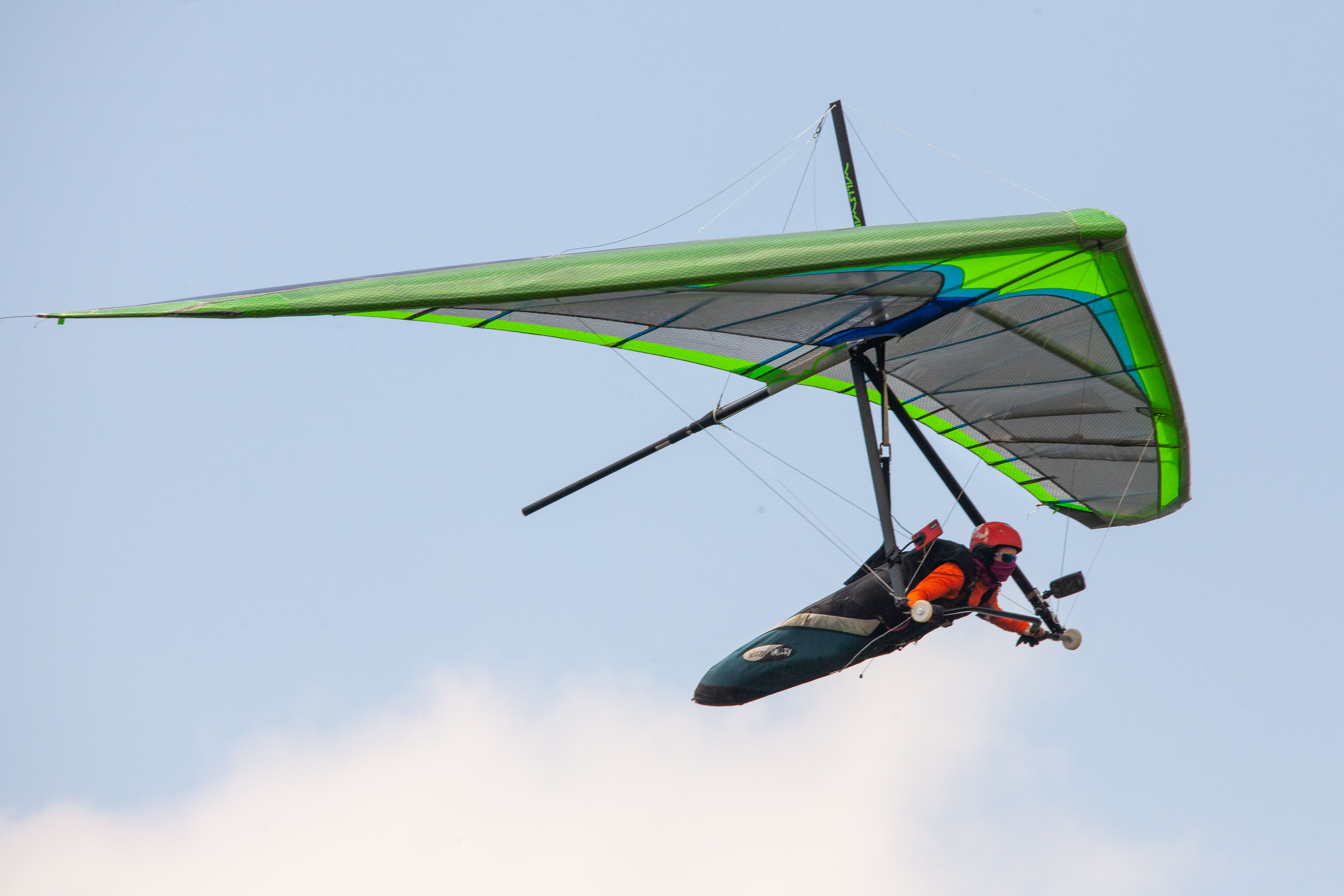
Wills Wing Sport 3 recreational and sports competition hang glider

The company was formed as Sport Kites, Inc in 1973 and started doing business under the name Wills Wing in 1978.

In 1973 Chris Wills took first place and Bob Wills won second place in the first US National Hang Gliding Championships. The next year Bob Wills won first place and Chris Wills took second place at the second US Nationals.

Chris and Bob Wills' brother, Eric Wills, was killed in a hang gliding accident in 1974.

Chris Wills left the company in 1976 to attend medical school and pursue a career as a physician. Bob Wills was killed in a hang gliding accident while making a Jeep commercial on 24 June 1977. The majority ownership of the company was then sold to Rob Kells, Linda and Mike Meier and Steve Pearson.

By 1984 the company had become the largest hang glider manufacturer in North America and then later in the world.

A Wills Wing XC-185 hang glider is on display at the Canada Aviation and Space Museum, in Ottawa, while another Wills Wing glider is in the US Southwest Soaring Museum in Moriarty, New Mexico.

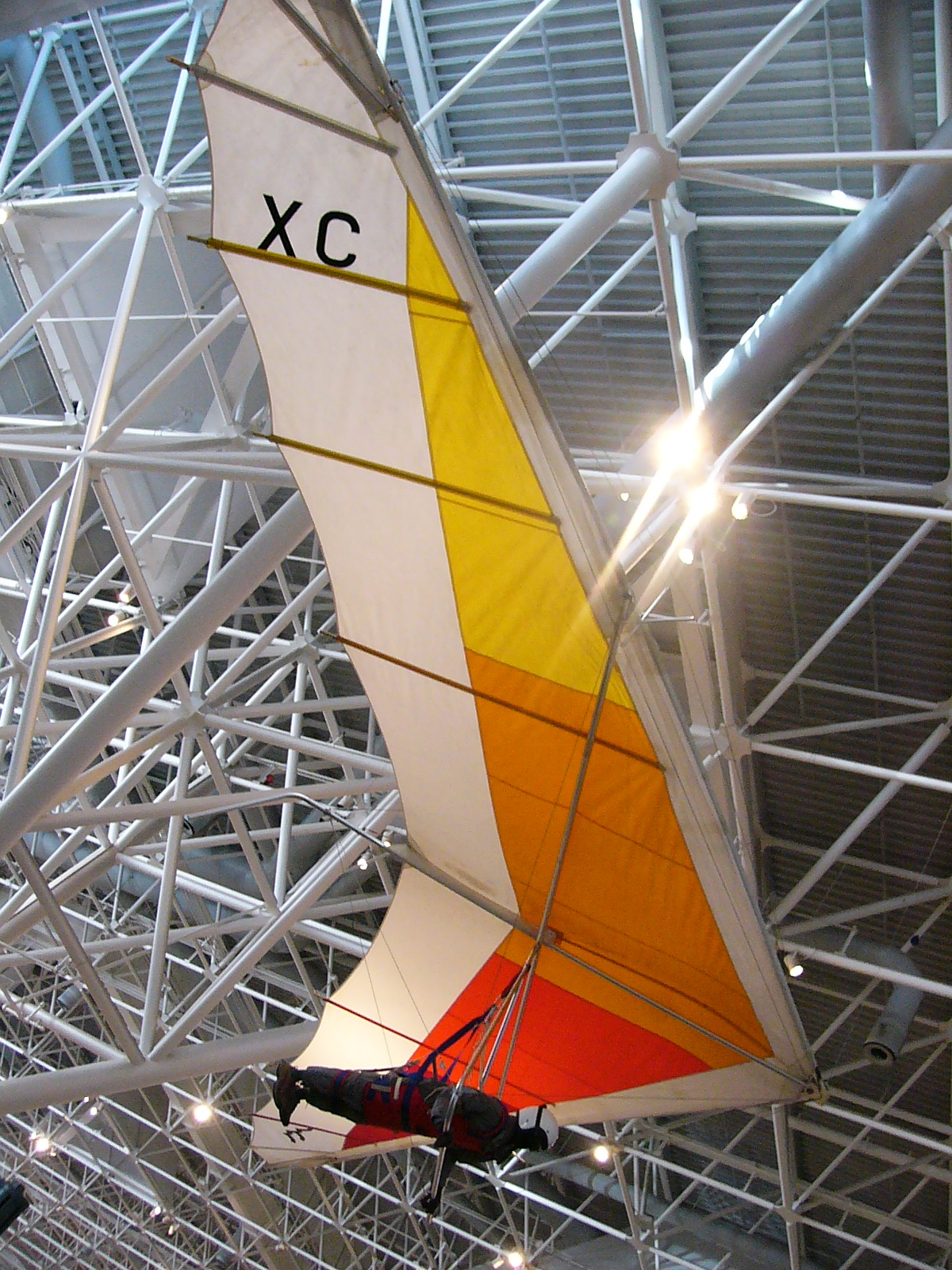
Wills Wing XC-185 on display in the Canada Aviation and Space Museum

In 2012 Wills Wing Team Pilot Dustin Martin set a new world record for Cross Country Open Distance in a Hang Glider of 475 miles flying a Wills Wing T2C 144.

== Opening of new production facility in Valle de Bravo, Mexico ==
In June, 2021 Wills Wing announced that they would be winding down operations at their Orange facility with a successor entity to be formed in Valle de Bravo, Mexico. Valle de Bravo is home to one of the most consistent flying sites in the world, and there is a strong local community of hang gliding pilots. By the end of the year, gliders produced from the new facility were being test flown, and in the following year, shipments were re-established to Wills Wing's network of distributors and dealers. By the end of 2024, more than 500 new gliders had been manufactured at the Valle de Bravo facility.

In June, 2025, the business announced an investment led by Italian based investor, Alistair Jeffery. Mr Jeffery joins Rudy and Jose Gotes and Chris Wills as major shareholders of the business.

== Aircraft ==
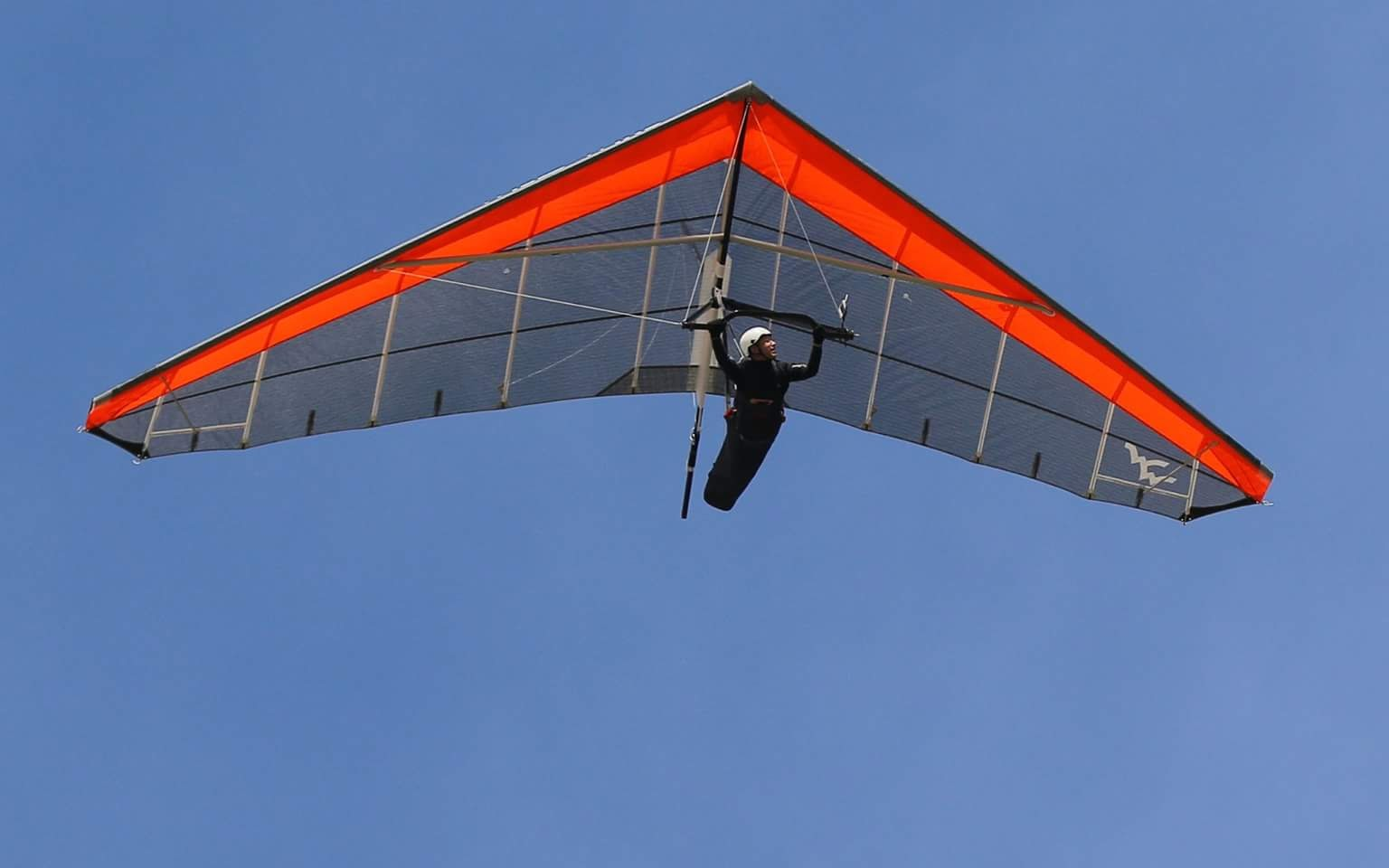
Wills Wing Falcon 4 being test flown by Steve Pearson

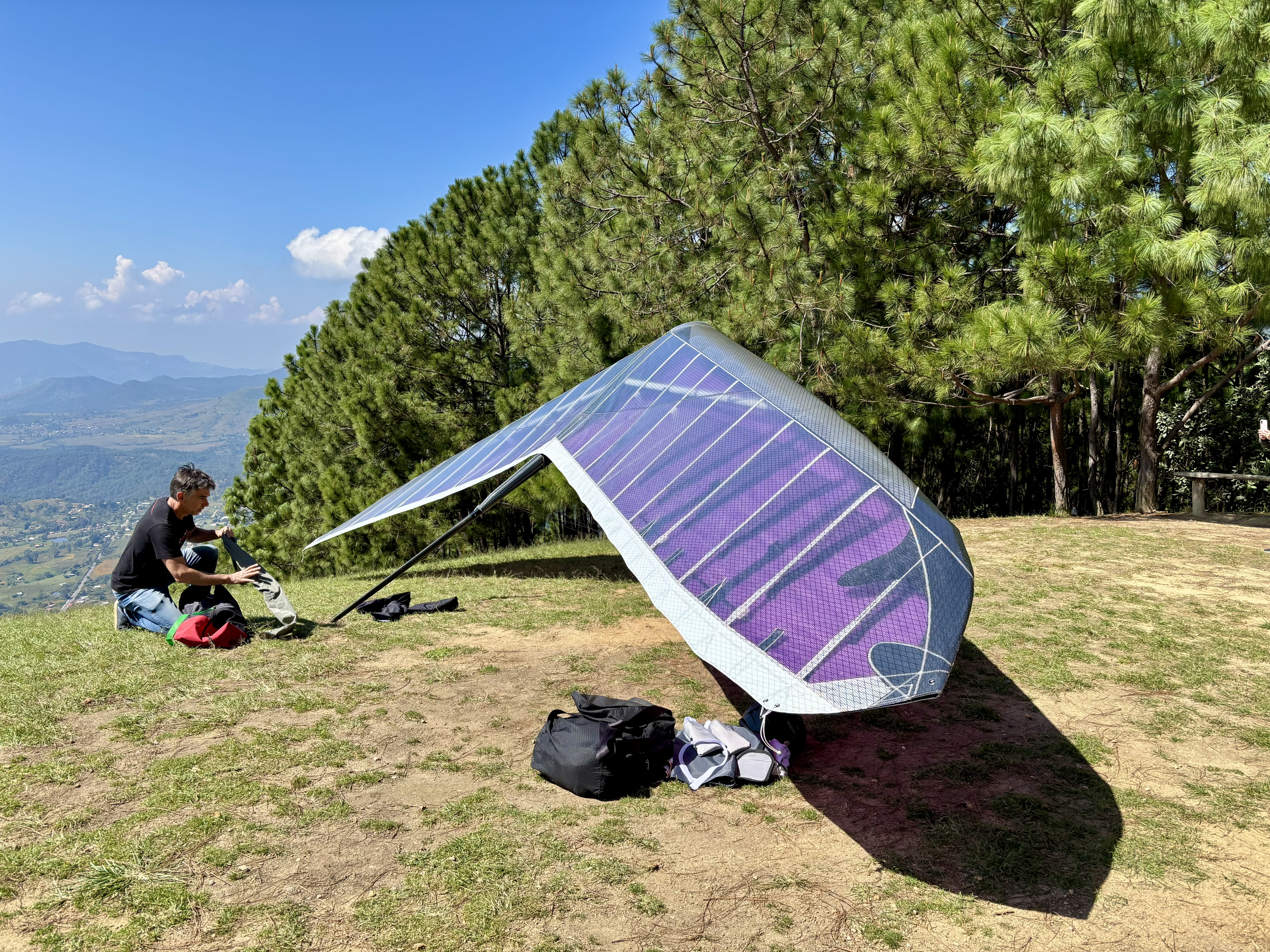
Wills Wing T3 hang glider

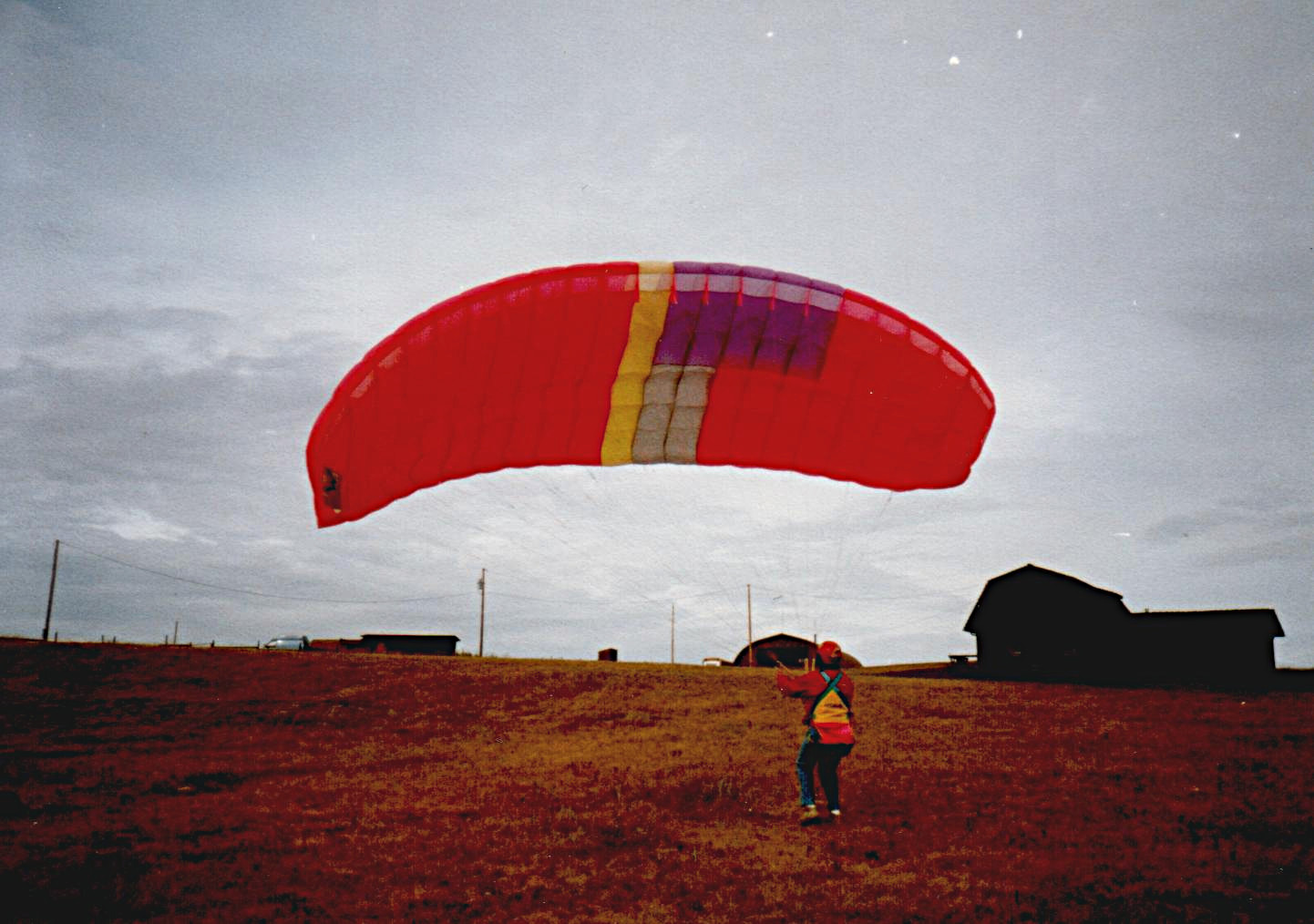
Wills Wing AT 123 paraglider

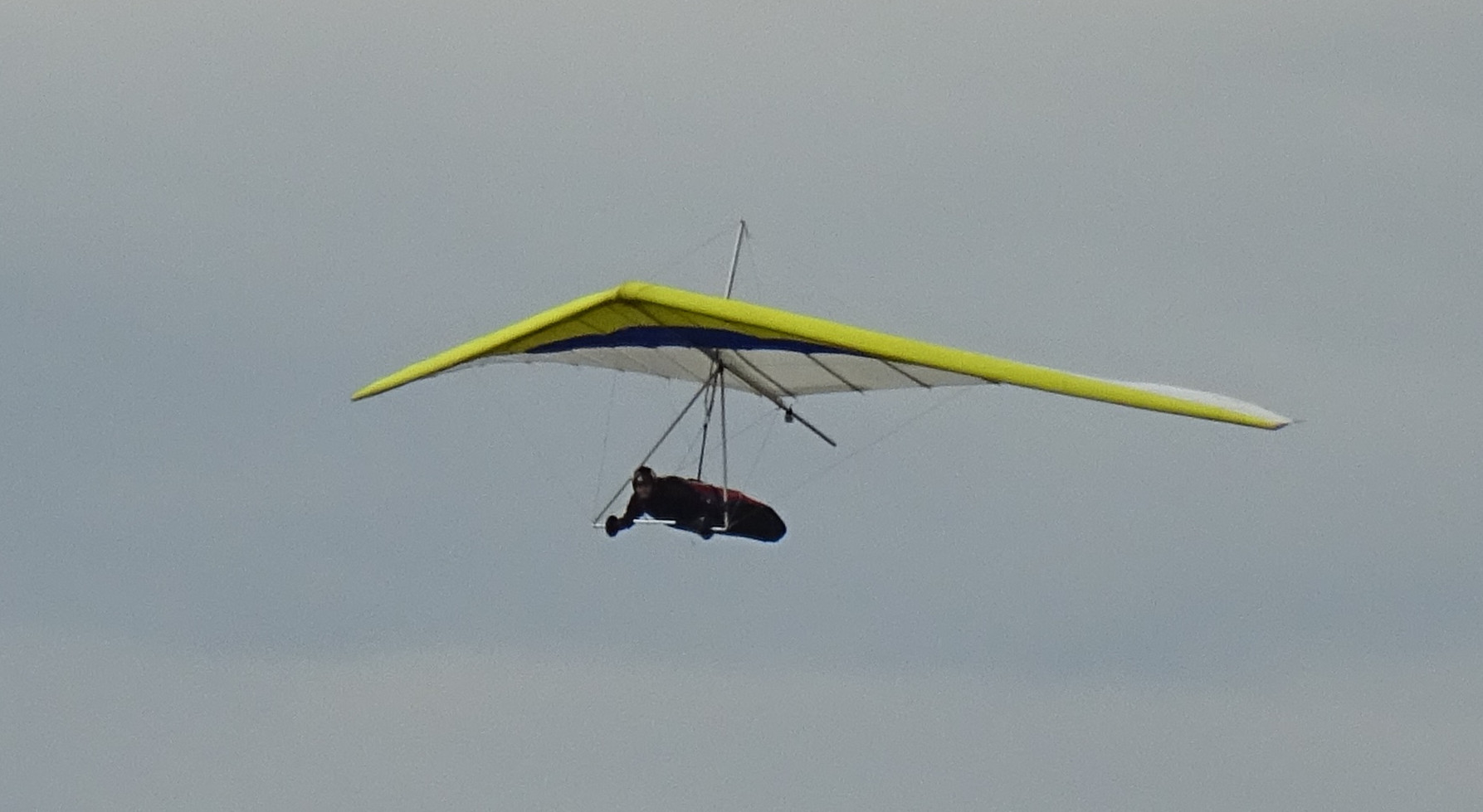
Wills Wing Eagle hang glider

List of aircraft built by Wills Wing:

=== Hang gliders ===
==== Current production ====
- Wills Wing Alpha
- Wills Wing Falcon
- Wills Wing Sport 3
- Wills Wing Sport 3 Race
- Wills Wing U2/U2C
- Wills Wing T3

==== Out of production ====
- Wills Wing Alpha (Original)
- Wills Wing Attack Duck
- Wills Wing Condor
- Wills Wing Duck
- Wills Wing Fusion
- Wills Wing Harrier
- Wills Wing HP
- Wills Wing HP AT
- Wills Wing Omega
- Wills Wing Omni
- Wills Wing RamAir
- Wills Wing Raven
- Wills Wing Skyhawk
- Wills Wing Spectrum
- Wills Wing Sport
- Wills Wing Sport American
- Wills Wing Sport AT
- Wills Wing Sport 2
- Wills Wing SST
- Wills Wing Super Sport
- Wills Wing T2/T2C
- Wills Wing Talon
- Wills Wing Ultra Sport
- Wills Wing XC
- Wills Wing Eagle

=== Paragliders ===
- Wills Wing AT 123
- Wills Wing AT 223
