= Technic'air =

French aircraft manufacturer

- Company type: Privately held company
- Industry: Aerospace
- Founded: circa 1998
- Founder: Pierre Allet
- Defunct: 2003
- Headquarters: Belvès, France
- Products: Powered parachutes

Technic'air was a French aircraft manufacturer based in Belvès. The company was founded by Pierre Allet, a paraglider pilot who had been on the 1991 French national team. The company specialized in the design and manufacture of powered parachutes in the form of ready-to-fly aircraft for the US FAR 103 Ultralight Vehicles rules and the European Fédération Aéronautique Internationale microlight categories.

The company seems to have been founded about 1998 and gone out of business in 2003.

During its time in business the company designed and produced a range of very simple and inexpensive powered parachute designs. These included the Technic'air Fly Roller which Allet flew across the Mediterranean Sea on one demonstration flight. Other designs were the Strato Light, Strato Micro, the Fly Roller Light and the two-place Flyroller Magnum Biplace.

Company designs were used to set three world records and were the aircraft of choice of Jacky Moussy, when he became French Microlight Champion in 1998.

The business included a paraglider dealership and CFR Périgord, an ultralight flight training school.

== Aircraft ==
Summary of aircraft built by Technic'air
Model name	First flight	Number built	Type
Technic'air Strato Light			Single-seat powered parachute
Technic'air Strato Micro			Single-seat powered parachute
Technic'air Fly Roller Light			Single-seat powered parachute
Technic'air Fly Roller			Single-seat powered parachute
Technic'air Flyroller Magnum Biplace			Two-seat powered parachute
