= Team Tango =

American aircraft manufacturer

- Company type: Privately held company
- Industry: Aerospace
- Headquarters: Williston, Florida, United States
- Products: Kit aircraft
- Owner: Revolution Aviation Inc.
- Website: revolutionaviation.net

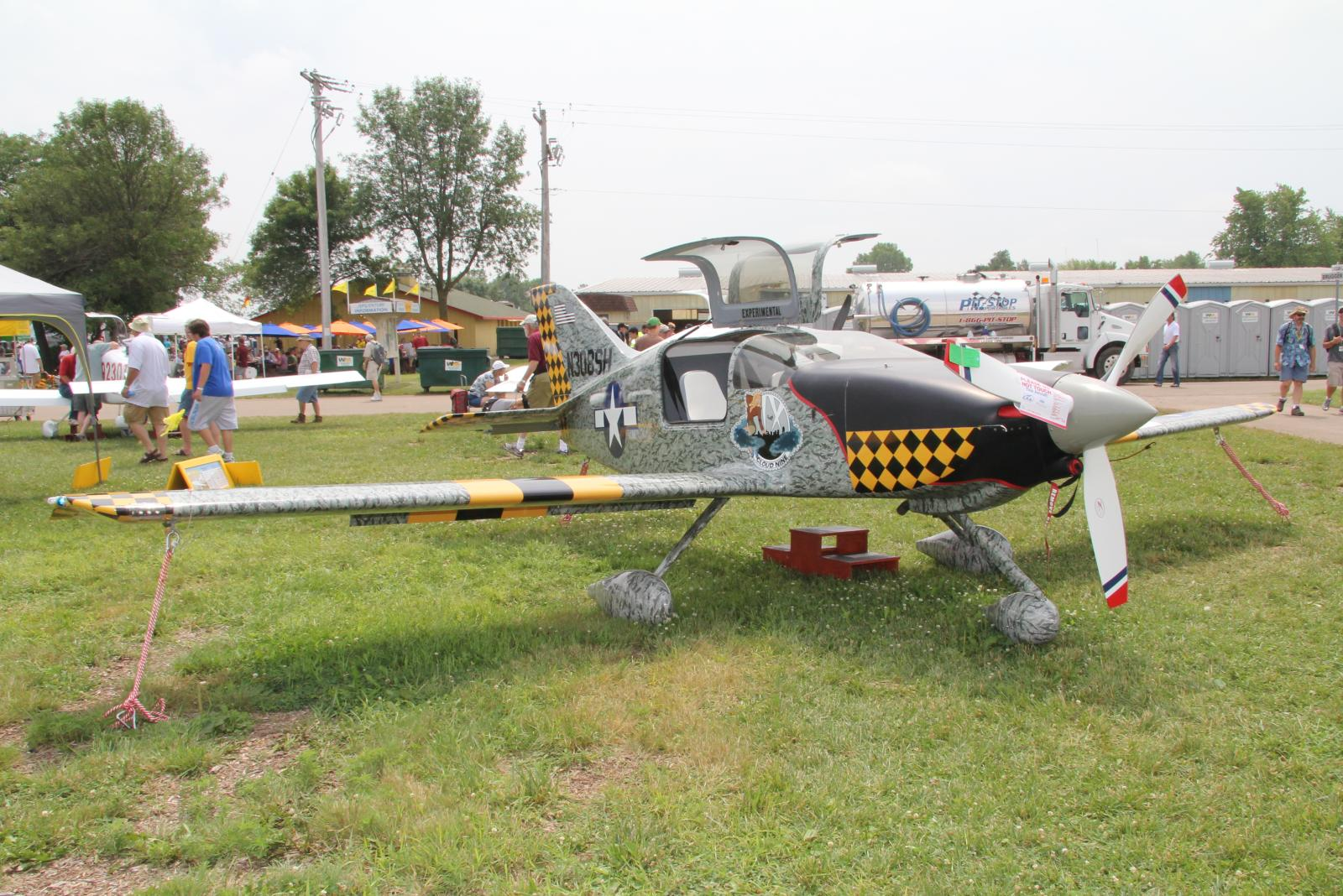
A Team Tango Tango 2 in an unusual paint scheme

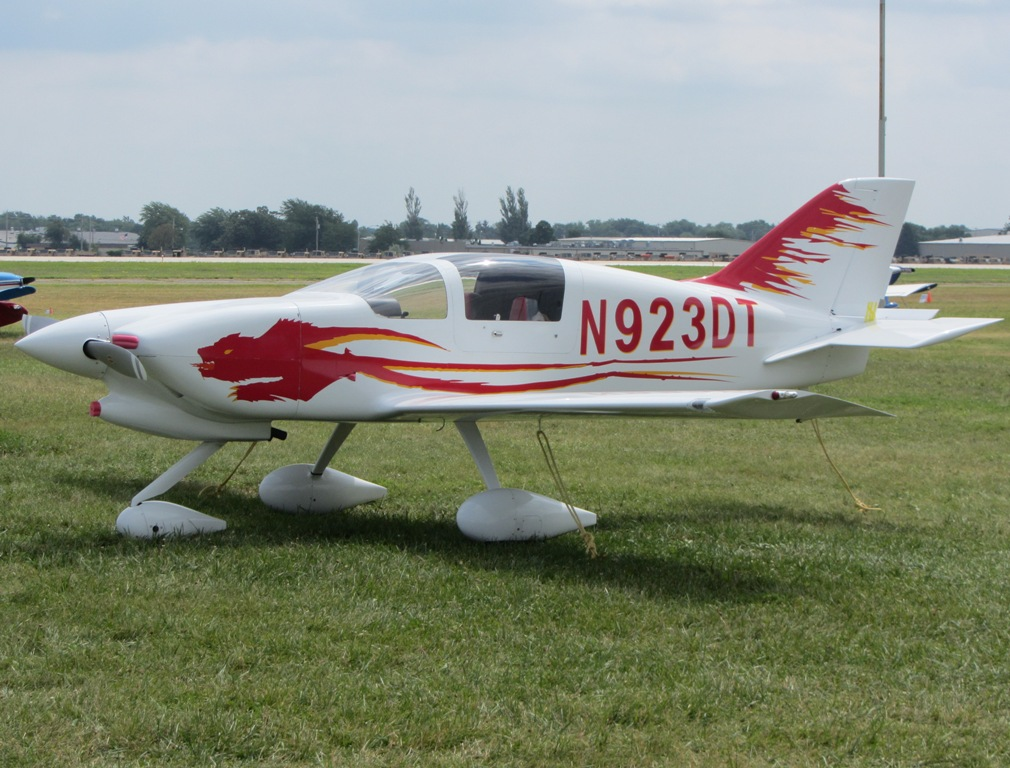
Team Tango Tango 2 built in 2008

Team Tango is an American aircraft manufacturer based in Williston, Florida and owned by Revolution Aviation Inc. The company specializes in the design and manufacture of light aircraft in the form of kits for amateur construction.

The company's first offering was the two-seats in side-by-side configuration Tango 2, a composite aircraft with a cruise speed of 182 kn (337 km/h). The company also offers a four-seater, the Team Tango Foxtrot, which has a cruise speed of 188 kn (348 km/h).

== Aircraft ==
Summary of aircraft built by Team Tango
Model name	First flight	Number built	Type
Team Tango Tango 2	1996	19 (2011)	Two seat composite homebuilt aircraft
Team Tango Foxtrot	2001	3 (2011)	Four seat composite homebuilt aircraft
