= Tellier T.2 =

General information
- Type: Patrol flying-boat
- National origin: France
- Manufacturer: Société Alphonse Tellier et Cie à Neuilly / Voisin
- Designer: Alphonse Tellier
- Number built: 1

History
- First flight: June 1916
- Developed into: Tellier T.3

The Tellier T.2 was a French two-seat patrol biplane flying-boat built by Société Alphonse Tellier et Cie à Neuilly (hull) and Voisin (wings). The wooden-hull flying boat used a 150 kW (200 hp) Hispano-Suiza 8Ba engine and was first flown in June 1916.

Test flights were successful, which led to orders for an improved variant, the Tellier T.3. The T.2 was destroyed in 1916, after an engine failed in flight, due to carburetor failure.

== Specifications ==
Data from French aircraft of the First World War

General characteristics

- Crew: 2
- Length: 11.84 m (38 ft 10 in)
- Wingspan: 15.6 m (51 ft 2 in)
- Height: 3.4 m (11 ft 2 in)
- Wing area: 47 m^{2} (510 sq ft)
- Empty weight: 1,150 kg (2,535 lb)
- Gross weight: 1,750 kg (3,858 lb)
- Powerplant: 1 × Hispano-Suiza 8Ba V-8 water-cooled piston engine, 150 kW (200 hp)
- Propellers: 2-bladed wooden fixed-pitch pusher propeller

Performance

- Maximum speed: 145 km/h (90 mph, 78 kn)
- Range: 700 km (430 mi, 380 nmi)
- Time to altitude: 1,000 m (3,300 ft) in 6 minutesd 30 seconds
