= List of gliders (T) =

This is a list of gliders/sailplanes of the world, (this reference lists all gliders with references, where available) Note: Any aircraft can glide for a short time, but gliders are designed to glide for longer.

== T ==
=== Tachikawa ===
(Tachikawa Aircraft Company Limited (立川飛行機株式会社, Tachikawa Kōkūki K.K.?))

- Tachikawa Ki-23
- Tachikawa Ki-25

=== Taglioretti ===
(Raúl Taglioretti)

- Taglioretti RT-1

=== Tainan ===
(Tainan Industry Co.)

- Tainan Mita 3

=== Takács ===
- Takács III

=== Takatori ===
- Takatori SH-1
- Takatori SH-8 Flider
- Takatori SH-15
- Takatori SH-16S
- Takatori SH-18 Mammoth

=== Tamworth ===
- Tamworth Brolga (glider)

=== Tangent Aircraft ===
- Tangent EMG-5

=== Tański ===
(Czesław Tański)

- Tański Lotnia (Tańskiego) I
- Tański Lotnia (Tańskiego) II
- Tański Lotnia (Tańskiego) III

=== Tarczyński-Stępniewski ===
(Tadeusz Tarczyński & Wiesław Stępniewski)

- Tarczyński and Stępniewki TS-1/34 Promyk

=== Taylor-Moore ===
(Lewis Taylor & Ted Moore)

- Taylor-Moore 1931 glider

=== Taylorcraft ===
- Taylorcraft LBT
- Taylorcraft LNT
- Taylorcraft TG-6
- Taylorcraft Model H

=== Technicair ===
(Technicair Ltd. Heston, Middlesex)

- Technicair Trainee

=== Technoflug ===
(Technoflug Leichtflugzeugbau GmbH)

- Technoflug Piccolo
- Technoflug TKF-2 Carat

=== Tedeschi ===
(Enzo Tedeschi / Associazone Aeronautica Modena (Italia))

- Tedeschi E.T.186

=== Teichfuss ===
(Luigi Teichfuss)

- Teichfuss Allievo Pavullo
- Teichfuss Allievo Pavullo Biposto
- Teichfuss Astore
- Teichfuss Balilla
- Teichfuss Biposto Scuola (not built)
- Teichfuss Borea
- Teichfuss Cicogna
- Teichfuss Condor 1
- Teichfuss Condor 2 (LT.02 FIDIA)
- Teichfuss Falco
- Teichfuss Gabbiano
- Teichfuss Grifo
- Teichfuss LT.03
- Teichfuss LT.10
- LT.12 Biposto
- Teichfuss LT.30
- LT.35 Borea (built but not flown)
- Teichfuss Nibio 1
- Teichfuss Nibio 2 Freccia Nera
- Teichfuss Orione 1
- Teichfuss Orione 2 (not built)
- Ornitottero (Aerocicloplano)
- Teichfuss Sparviero
- Teichfuss Super Grifo
- Teichfuss Tenax
- Teichfuss Turbine

=== TeST ===
(TeST sro (Division of Comp-Let sro), Velké Meziříĉi)

- TeST TST-1 Alpin
- TeST TST-3 Alpin T
- TeST TST-5 Variant
- TeST TST-6 Duo
- TeST TST-7 Junior
- TeST TST-9 Junior
- TeST TST-10 Atlas
- TeST TST-13 Junior
- TeST TST-14 Bonus
- TeST TST-14J BonusJet

=== THK ===
(Türk Hava Kurumu)

- THK-01 – WĘDRYCHOWSKI, J. & DULĘBA, Leszka & ROGALSKI, Stanisław & TEISSEYRE, Jerzy – Türk Hava Kurumu
- THK-03 – JACOBS, Hans & DFS – (DFS Habicht)
- THK-04 – SSCB – Türk Hava Kurumu (АНТОНОВ УС-4 (Antonov US-4))
- THK-07 – Antonov, Oleg Konstantinovich & SSBC – Türk Hava Kurumu (Antonov PS-2)
- THK-09 – SCHAWROW, W. B. & SSCB – Türk Hava Kurumu
- THK-13

=== Tingskou ===
(Paul Tingskou – built by Oscar "Pete" Peterson)

- Tingskou Viking 104

=== Todhunter ===
(Reg W. Todhunter)

- Todhunter T-5 Blue Wren
- Todhunter Twin Plank

=== Teruhiko ===
(Ukai Teruhiko)

- Teruhiko Eagle (霧ケ峰式鷹型)

=== Tervamäki ===
(Jukka Tervamäki)

- Tervamäki JT-6
- Tervamäki JT-8

=== Tērvete ===
- Tērvete (glider)

=== Thoenes ===
(Alexander Thoenes)

- Thoenes Alexander-der-Kleine –

=== Thomas ===
(A. Thomas)

- Thomas 1923 glider

=== Thomas ===
(R.R. Thomas)

- Thomas Primary 1930,

=== Thorouss ===
(Gustave Thorouss)

- Thorouss 1922 glider

=== Tikhonravov ===
( M. K. Tikhonravov)

- Tikhonravov AVF-1 Aral – (Тихонравова АВФ-1 Арап) – M. K. Tikhonravov – Aviarabotnik

=== Timm ===
(Timm Aircraft Company)

- Timm AG-2

=== Timmins ===
(Dennis Timmins)

- Timmins 1930 glider

=== Tolstoï-Zeyvang ===
(I. L. Tolstoï, G. P. Tolstoï & K. Zeyvang)

- Tolstoï-Zeyvang Korchoun (aka Толстых Коршун - Tolstoï Cerf-volant)

=== Tokyo University ===
- Tokyo University 1909 glider

=== Tomasini ===
(Charles Tomasini)

- Tomasini 1923 glider

=== Tomaszewski-Muraszew ===
( H. Tomaszewski & A. Muraszew)

- Tomaszewski-Muraszew MT-1

=== Torino ===
()

- Torino 26
- Torino 27
- Torino 28
- Torino 41

=== Torva ===
- Torva 15 Sprite
- Torva 15 Sport

=== Toso ===
(Ilare Fauto Toso & Baricelli Gaudencio Toso)

- Toso I
- Toso II
- Toso Motoplaneador

=== Tóth ===
- Tóth Furnér-Gép

=== Trager-Bierens ===
(Kempes Trager and John Bierens)

- Trager-Bierens T-3 Alibi

=== Tramdachs ===
(Fricis Tramdachs)

- Tramdachs YL-12
- Tramdachs YL-13
- Tramdachs YL-14

=== Trejbal-Prasil ===
- Trejbal-Prasil Rok Vyroby

=== Trucet ===
(Jean-Marc Truchet)

- Truchet Tr-301 Abyssin

=== TsAGI ===
(Tsentral'nyy Aerodinamicheskiy i Gidrodinamicheskiy Institut- central aerodynamics and hydrodynamics institute)

- TsAGI BP-1 – SENKOW
- TsAGI BP-2 – BIELIAJEV
- TsAGI BP-3 – BIELIAJEV
- TsAGI MAI 68

=== Tsuno ===
(Takishiro Tsuno / Teikoku Syounenn (Tokyo Motor Boat) / Kyushu University (天風 水陸両用) )

- Temptu T-2 Kuken 2600 (天風 水陸両用)

=== Tsybin ===
(Pavel Vladimirovič Tsybin / OKB Tsybin)

- Tsybin UL-1 (Цыбин УЛ-1)
- Tsybin Ts-25 (Цыбин Ц-25)

=== Tułacz ===
(Piotr Tulacz)

- Tułacz M.1

=== Tunzeng ===
(Jan Tunzeng)

- Tunzeng Zobor 1
- Tunzeng Zobor 2

=== Tupolev ===
(Andrei Nikolayevich Tupolev)

- Tupolev TB-6 glider
- Tupolev ANT-33

=== Turbay ===
( Alfredo Turbay)

- Turbay T-2 Cadet (designation re-used for a later twin-engined design)
- Turbay T-3 Cadet (designation re-used for a later twin-engined design)

=== Tweed ===
(George Tweed)

- Tweed GT-1

=== TWI ===
(TWI Flugzeug GmbH)

- TWI Taifun
- TWI Kiwi

=== Twist Master ===
- Twist Master
