= Tarczyński =

Tarczyński (feminine: Tarczyńska, plural: Tarczyńscy) is a Polish surname. Tarczyński surname is derived from the town Tarczyn. Notable people with the name include:

- Agata Tarczyńska (born 1988), Polish footballer
- Dawid Tarczyński, American football player, 2010 PLFA season final MVP
- Dominik Tarczyński (born 1979), Polish politician and journalist
- Halinka Tarczynska-Fiddian (1923–2019), Australian operatic soprano and singing teacher, daughter of Stanislaw
- Kazimierz Tarczyński, participant in the 1956 Rally Poland
- Marcin Tarczyński (born 1990), Polish swimmer
- Stanislaw Victor de Tarczynski (1882–1952), Polish-born Australian violinist and music teacher, father of Halinka
- Tadeusz Tarczyński, designer of the Tarczyński and Stępniewki TS-1/34 Promyk, a short span, high performance sailplane
- Trevor Tarczynski, art designer
- Waldemar Tarczyński (born 1960), University of Szczecin rector

== Other ==
- Tarczyński Group, a Polish meat company
- Tarczyński Arena Wrocław, stadium opened in 2011 in Wrocław
