= TeST Junior =

TeST Junior may refer to one of a series of motor gliders:

- TeST TST-7 Junior
- TeST TST-9 Junior
- TeST TST-13 Junior
