= Nibbio =

Nibbio may refer to:

- Aviamilano Nibbio, Italian monoplane
- 599 GTZ Nibbio Zagato, Ferrari grand tourer
- Teichfuss Nibbio, Italian single seat glider
- Italian ship Nibbio
