= TeST TST-14 =

TeST TST-14 may refer to:

- TeST TST-14 Bonus, piston-powered motor glider
- TeST TST-14J BonusJet, jet-powered motorglider
