= BS20 =

BS20 may refer to:

- BS20, a BS postcode area for Bristol, England
- Bonomi BS.20 Albanella, a sailplane
- BS 20 Report on BS Screw Threads, a British Standard
- Bernardo Silva, professional footballer referred to by his initials and kit number
