= Teichfuss Supergrifo =

Supergrifo

General information
- Type: Performance single-seat glider
- National origin: Italy
- Manufacturer: F.A.L. Teichfuss (Fabrica Alianti Teichfuss), la Aie, Pavulla
- Designer: Luigi Teichfluss
- Number built: 1

History
- First flight: 1935

The Teichfuss Supergrifo or Super Grifo was an Italian competition glider designed by Luigi Teichfuss and flown in 1935. Only one was built.

== Design and development ==
The Supergrifo design began as an attempt to improve upon the Grifo but evolved into a much higher performance aircraft. The two models shared the same fuselage apart from the introduction of an enclosed cockpit but its wing was entirely new and of much greater span.

It was a braced high-wing monoplane, its single spar wing having a centre section, covering about one third of the span, which was rectangular in plan and had slight dihedral. The rest of the wing was strongly tapered to rounded wing tips; there was no sweep on the leading edges but the trailing edges were forward swept. There was no dihedral on these outer panels, making the Supergrifo slightly gull winged. Ailerons almost filled their trailing edges. The increase of span to 18 m (59 ft 1 in) increased the aspect ratio by 60% to just over 20:1. The wing was centrally mounted over the fuselage on a pedestal, which dropped rapidly away to the upper fuselage behind the trailing edge, and braced on each side by a pair of parallel faired struts from the lower fuselage to the ends of the wing central panel.

The Supergrifo's fuselage was a ply covered wooden hexagonal structure with deep sides. The cockpit, placed immediately ahead of the pedestal, was covered with a multi-transparency canopy attached to the cockpit rim and lifting off in one piece. All the tail surfaces were straight tapered and straight tipped, with the tailplane mounted on top of the fuselage and carrying unbalanced elevators. The fin was small but mounted a large, balanced rudder which extended down to the keel, working in an elevator cut-out and provided with a protecting tail bumper. The Supergrifo's landing skid, equipped with rubber shock absorbers, reached aft to the rear wing strut.

The Supergrifo first flew in 1935. Only one was built. It competed in the Second Italian National Gliding Competition, held at Asiago in August 1938. There, Adriano Mantelli won the City of Vicenza prize for a flight to that city lasting 219 minutes and gaining 2,000 m (6,600 ft) en route.

== Specifications ==
Data from The Sailplane May 1950

General characteristics

- Crew: One
- Length: 6.80 m (22 ft 4 in)
- Wingspan: 18 m (59 ft 1 in)
- Wing area: 16 m^{2} (170 sq ft)
- Aspect ratio: 20.1
- Empty weight: 204 kg (450 lb)
- Gross weight: 289 kg (637 lb)

Performance

- Maximum glide ratio: 26:1
- Rate of sink: 0.65 m/s (128 ft/min) minimum
- Wing loading: 18 kg/m^{2} (3.7 lb/sq ft)

== See also ==
Related lists

- List of gliders
