= Teichfuss Cicogna =

Italian tailless motor glider

Cicogna

General information
- Type: Tailless motor glider
- National origin: Italy
- Manufacturer: F.A.L. Teichfuss (Fabrica Alianti Teichfuss), la Aie, Pavullo
- Designer: Luigi Teichfluss
- Number built: 2

History
- First flight: 1936

The Teichfuss Cicogna (English: Goshawk) was an Italian tailless single-seat motor glider designed by Luigi Teichfuss and flown in 1936.

== Design and development ==
The 1936 Cicogna was a tailless and powered version of the Teichfuss Astore, which was in turn very similar to the RRG Falke designed in 1930 by Alexander Lippisch. Lippisch had developed that conventional, but swept wing, glider from the 1929 RRG Storch IV, the most successful of his early tailless gliders, fitted with an engine in the same year and renamed the RRG Storch V. Thus the Cicogna and Storch IV and V shared a very similar wing, though the Italian motor glider had a 14% greater span.

Like the Astore, the Cicogna was a braced high-wing monoplane, its constant chord wing swept at about 10°. The wing was a single spar structure with plywood covering from the spar forward around the leading edge forming a torsion-resistant D-box. Aft of the spar the wing was fabric covered. Ailerons were hinged at right angles to the fuselage and had curved edges which blended into rounded wing tips. The wing, which was mounted with dihedral, was supported over the fuselage by a pair of inverted V-struts from the upper longerons and a small pillar behind the cockpit. A longer faired bracing V-strut joined the lower longeron to the wing at about one third span on each side. Since the Cicogna was tailless it had a pair of straight-edged, short wing tip fins and taller rudders for directional stability and control, the fins assisted by the side area of the flat sided rear fuselage.

The fuselage was a ply covered wooden hexagonal structure with deep sides and an open cockpit under the wing, very similar to that of the Astore from nose to the rear of the cockpit but then tapering rapidly in plan to form a short pod. It ended at a concave vertical knife edge with the engine, propeller shaft and pusher configuration propeller under its upper surface; the propeller was as far aft as the aileron hinges.

The Cicogna first flew in 1936, though launched as a glider by aerotow. There is no evidence that it flew under power or that the troublesome 25 hp (19 kW) flat twin engine was ever fitted. Two were built.

== Specifications ==
Data from Perielli (2011) p.49

General characteristics

- Crew: One
- Length: 3.80 m (12 ft 6 in)
- Wingspan: 14 m (45 ft 11 in)
- Height: 1.48 m (4 ft 10 in)
- Wing area: 18 m^{2} (190 sq ft)
- Aspect ratio: 11
- Airfoil: Göttingen 535 inboard, NACA M6 at tip
- Empty weight: 210 kg (463 lb)
- Gross weight: 295 kg (650 lb)
- Powerplant: 1 × Unknown air-cooled flat twin-cylinder, 19 kW (25 hp)
- Propellers: 2-bladed pusher configuration

Performance

- Maximum glide ratio: 17:1
- Rate of sink: 0.85 m/s (167 ft/min) minimum
- Wing loading: 16.34 kg/m^{2} (3.35 lb/sq ft)

== See also ==
Related lists

- List of gliders
