= Teichfuss Balilla =

Balilla

General information
- Type: Single seat Primary glider
- National origin: Italy
- Manufacturer: F.A.L. Teichfuss (Fabrica Alianti Teichfuss), la Aie, Pavullo
- Designer: Luigi Teichfuss
- Primary user: Gliding clubs
- Number built: 10

History
- First flight: 1939

The Teichfuss Balilla was an Italian single seat primary glider, designed by Luigi Teichfuss and flown in 1939.

== Design and development ==
In 1929 Luigi Teichfuss produced the Nibio I, his first primary glider with a conventional fuselage rather than an open girder frame. Ten years later he designed an improved version, the Balilla. It was a simple, low cost, robust, high wing, strut braced monoplane with an unswept, constant chord, elliptically tipped wing. Mounted with dihedral, this was supported over the fuselage on a narrow pedestal and braced on each side by a parallel pair of faired lift struts from the lower fuselage to the wings at about half span.

Its fuselage was wood framed, flat sided and plywood skinned. Its cockpit, open but with a small windscreen, was immediately ahead of the wing leading edge; there were no instruments. The Balilla's tail surfaces were all straight edged: the tailplane, single strut braced from below, had a sharply swept leading edge and carried elevators with angled tips and a cut-out for rudder movement. The vertical tail was tapered with a squared tip; the rudder reached to the keel, where it was protected by a wire loop tail bumper. Elevators and the rudder lacked aerodynamic balances. A conventional skid, running from the nose to below the wing trailing edge formed the undercarriage.

The Ballila first flew in 1939. Ten were built, serving all the gliding schools of the R.U.N.A. It could be winch launched and was straightforward to fly, training novice pilots to their B-certificate.

== Specifications ==
Data from Pedrielli (2011) p.57

General characteristics

- Capacity: One
- Length: 6.38 m (20 ft 11 in)
- Wingspan: 12.50 m (41 ft 0 in)
- Height: 1.48 m (4 ft 10 in)
- Wing area: 16.6 m^{2} (179 sq ft)
- Aspect ratio: 9.4
- Airfoil: Göttingen 535
- Empty weight: 126 kg (278 lb)
- Gross weight: 211 kg (465 lb)

Performance

- Maximum glide ratio: estimated 17:1
- Rate of sink: 0.85 m/s (167 ft/min) minimum
- Wing loading: 11.6 kg/m^{2} (2.4 lb/sq ft)

== See also ==
Related lists

- List of gliders
