= Halinka Tarczynska-Fiddian =

Australian soprano and singing teacher (1923–2019)

- Born: Halinka de Tarczynska; 9 July 1923; Melbourne, Australia
- Died: 22 June 2019 (aged 95)
- Father: Stanislaw Victor de Tarczynski

Halinka Tarczynska-Fiddian (1923-2019) was an Australian soprano opera singer and educator.

== Life and career ==
Halinka de Tarczynska was the only daughter of Polish-Australian violinist Stanislaw Victor de Tarczynski and Jadwiga (née Kilbach). Born in Melbourne, she was taught piano by her mother from age four, and at eleven was performing with the Victorian Symphony Orchestra and sining in Italian, French and German for the ABC. She also spoke and sang in Polish and English.

She studied with Edward Goll, and Ignaz Friedman, and sang with the National Opera, J. C. Williamson productions, as well as made recordings for Columbia. She was also an amateur film-maker and actor, and in 1945 won an award for her short comedy film Miss Understanding. She acted in the film alongside Peter French and Gwen Moloney.

During the 1950s, she moved to London and performed for BBC radio and television, as well as at festivals in Edinburgh and Berlin. After five years overseas, she returned to Australia. She married Paull Fiddian in 1963, who worked at the University of Melbourne's Conservatorium of Music. In her later career, Tarczynska-Fiddian taught singing from her home. Her students included Jacqueline Dark.

Halinka Tarczynska-Fiddian died in June 2019. Ballarat Heritage Services hold a small archive of memories and photographs relating to her life and career.
