= Teichfuss Orione =

Orione

General information
- Type: Competition single-seat glider
- National origin: Italy
- Designer: Luigi Teichfuss
- Number built: 1

History
- First flight: 1932

The Teichfuss Orione (English: Orion) was an Italian high performance single seat glider, designed by Luigi Teichfuss. It made a six-hour record flight and also flew as the Italian representative at the 1936 Olympics.

== Design and development ==
The Orione was a cantilever high-wing monoplane, designed for high performance, competition flying and record breaking. Its wing had a rectangular-plan central piece, occupying about one-third of the span, and outer straight tapered panels with rounded tips. Ailerons occupied the whole trailing edges of these outer panels and were unusual in extending aft beyond the trailing edge of the centre section. There were no inboard flaps or air brakes.

It had an oval cross-section fuselage of pod and boom form, much slimmer aft of the wing. The pilot's cockpit was slightly ahead of the leading edge. Originally the cockpit was open, though with a long, unstepped, multi-paned glazing ahead of the seat; later this was replaced by an enclosing multi-framed canopy that merged aft into the fuselage. The tail unit was rather similar to that of the earlier Falco, with a single piece, all moving elevator with a straight leading edge and a semi-elliptical trailing edge and a small triangular fin which supported a much larger, tall balanced rudder, essentially triangular in shape but with rounded vertices. Hinged above the elevator trailing edge, which had a large cut-out for its movement, the rudder extended down to the keel where it was protected by a small, faired underfin/tail bumper. There was a short landing skid running from near the nose to below mid-chord.

The Orione was first flown in 1932. There is firm evidence for the construction of just one example. This aircraft was one of two Italian representatives at the Berlin Olympic Games of 1936 (the other was the Bonomi BS.20 Albanella), part of a successful demonstration to establish gliding as an Olympic sport (Gliding at the 1936 Summer Olympics). The following year it took part in the First Italian National Gliding Competition, held in Asiago in August; flown by Aldo Tait it set an Italian endurance record with a flight of 5 hr 58 min. (Note: Pedrielli says this took place at the Second Asiago meeting, in 1938) Near the start of World War II there were plans to produce a version with a 1.2 m (3 ft 11 in) span increase, the Orione 2, but this was never built.

== Variants ==
Orione 1
Competition glider, flown 1932. One only.
Orione 2
Early 1940s proposed long span development, not built.

== Specifications (Oreone 1) ==
Data from Pedrielli (2011) pp.38-9

General characteristics

- Capacity: One
- Length: 7.18 m (23 ft 7 in)
- Wingspan: 16.60 m (54 ft 6 in)
- Height: 1.3 m (4 ft 3 in)
- Wing area: 16.60 m^{2} (178.7 sq ft)
- Aspect ratio: 16
- Airfoil: Göttingen 535 root, NACA M6 tip
- Empty weight: 238 kg (525 lb)
- Gross weight: 323 kg (712 lb)

Performance

- Maximum glide ratio: estimated 19:1
- Rate of sink: 0.75 m/s (148 ft/min) minimum
- Wing loading: 19.6 kg/m^{2} (4.0 lb/sq ft)

== See also ==
Related lists

- List of gliders
