= Bonomi BS.20 Albanella =

BS.20 Albanella

General information
- Type: Performance glider
- National origin: Italy
- Manufacturer: Aeronautica Bonomi
- Designer: Camillo Silva
- Number built: 1 or 2

History
- First flight: 1939

The Bonomi BS.20 Albanella (English: Montagu's harrier) was a performance sailplane designed and built in Italy in the late-1930s. Rather little is known about it; either one or two were constructed.

== Design and development ==
The BS.20 Albanella is not well documented and the little that is known about it comes a hand-written note on its general characteristics, a number of photographs taken at Milan in the mid-1930s and a sketch on a postcard. It may have been intended for aerobatics.

The Albanella was a cantilever shoulder wing monoplane with a swept straight tapered wing which ended in rounded tips. All the sweep was on the leading edge. Long ailerons occupied more than half the span. As elsewhere on the BS.20, the wing covering was a mixture of plywood and fabric. Its oval cross-section fuselage was conventional at the front, with the pilot's open cockpit just ahead of the leading edge with an eye-line over the upper wing. The main landing gear was a sprung ventral skid stretching from near the nose to below the wing trailing edge. The dorsal line was straight in elevation but immediately aft of the wings the lower ventral line turned quickly upwards and the fuselage became much finer, almost producing a pod and boom form. Horizontal rear surfaces were elliptical in plan. The vertical tail was straight tapered to a rounded tip with a rudder extending down to the keel and operating in an elevator cut-out.

Photographs suggest there were two somewhat different versions, though whether as a result of modification or the construction of a second prototype is not known.

The Albanella was one of two Italian representatives at the Berlin Olympic Games of 1936 (the other was the Teichfuss Orione), part of a successful demonstration to establish gliding as an Olympic sport (Gliding at the 1936 Summer Olympics).

== Specifications ==
Data from Pedrielli (2011) p.101

General characteristics

- Crew: One
- Length: 6.06 m (19 ft 11 in)
- Wingspan: 15.25 m (50 ft 0 in)
- Wing area: 15.20 m^{2} (163.6 sq ft)
- Aspect ratio: 15
- Empty weight: 185 kg (408 lb)
- Gross weight: 270 kg (595 lb)

Performance

- Maximum glide ratio: 24:1
- Wing loading: 17.80 kg/m^{2} (3.65 lb/sq ft)
