= TeST TST-13 Junior =

TST-13 Junior

General information
- Type: Motor glider
- National origin: Czech Republic
- Manufacturer: TeST sro (Division of Comp-Let sro), Velké Meziříĉi
- Number built: 5 by 2007

History
- Developed from: TeST TST-9 Junior, TeST TST-10 Atlas

The TeST TST-13 Junior is a single-seat touring motor glider with a nose-mounted engine, built by TeST in Czech Republic. It is an all composite design which succeeded the TeST TST-9 Junior motor glider in production, incorporating some features of the TeST TST-10 Atlas sailplane, including its wing.

== Development and design ==
TeST introduced the TST-13 single seat motor glider in 2005 as an all-composite replacement for their wood and composite TST-9. It has a similar layout, front engined and with a high T-tail. The TST-13 shares a similar rear fuselage and tail design and identical wing spars with the all-composite TST-10 single seat sailplane. It is a mid wing design with straight tapered wings which, unlike those of the TST-10, are swept forward 5° at 25% chord. The wing tips carry winglets and there are outboard ailerons, two position flaps and upper surface spoilers.

The fuselage of the TST-13 is built from two half shells which incorporate the straight tapered fin. The fuselage tapers rearwards, producing an arched shape below. The tailplane carries a single piece elevator. The light aircraft style cockpit has a rear hinged, single piece canopy and is placed ahead of the wing leading edge. The TST-13 has a tailwheel undercarriage, with spatted mainwheels on fuselage-mounted, sprung, cantilever legs.

There is a choice of two engines: either a 31 kW (42 hp) Rotax 447 or a 37 kW (50 hp) Rotax 503. The 447 drives a propeller which is only adjustable in pitch on the ground, but that of the 503, geared down 2:1, can be feathered in flight. Feathering improves the best glide ratio from 1:24 to 1:32. The greater power of the Rotax 503 increases the cruising speed by about 10 km/h and the climb rate to about 6 m/s (1,200 ft/min).

== Operational history ==
5 TST-13s had been built by 2007. In mid-2010 2 appeared on civil aircraft registers of European countries west of Russia. The TST-13 is designed to meet the US LSA glider constraints and is S-LSA registerable.

== Specifications (Rotax 447 engine) ==
Data from Jane's All the World's Aircraft 2010/11

General characteristics

- Crew: 1
- Length: 7.45 m (24 ft 5 in)
- Wingspan: 15.00 m (49 ft 3 in)
- Wing area: 10.3 m^{2} (111 sq ft)
- Aspect ratio: 21.8
- Empty weight: 195 kg (430 lb)
- Max takeoff weight: 300 kg (661 lb) 322 kg (710 lb) with BRS ballistic parachute recovery parachute
- Fuel capacity: 20 L (4.4 Imp gal; 5.3 US gal) standard: can be doubled with interchangeable wing tanks
- Powerplant: 1 × Rotax 447 , 31 kW (42 hp)
- Propellers: 2-bladed ground adjustable pitch SportProp 1600 or similar, 1.60 m (5 ft 3 in) diameter

Performance

- Cruise speed: 160 km/h (99 mph, 86 kn)
- Stall speed: 65 km/h (40 mph, 35 kn) maximum; normal 120 km/h (75 mph; 65 kt)
- Never exceed speed: 200 km/h (120 mph, 110 kn)
- g limits: +4.8/-2.8
- Maximum glide ratio: unpowered, 24

== See also ==
- List of gliders
