= Tsybin =

Tsybin (Russian: Цыбин) is a Russian surname. Notable people with the surname include:

- Vladimir Tsybin (1877–1949), Russian flautist, composer, and conductor
- Boris Tsybin (1928–2011), Soviet speed skater
