= Stanislaw Victor de Tarczynski =

Stanislaw Victor de Tarczyński
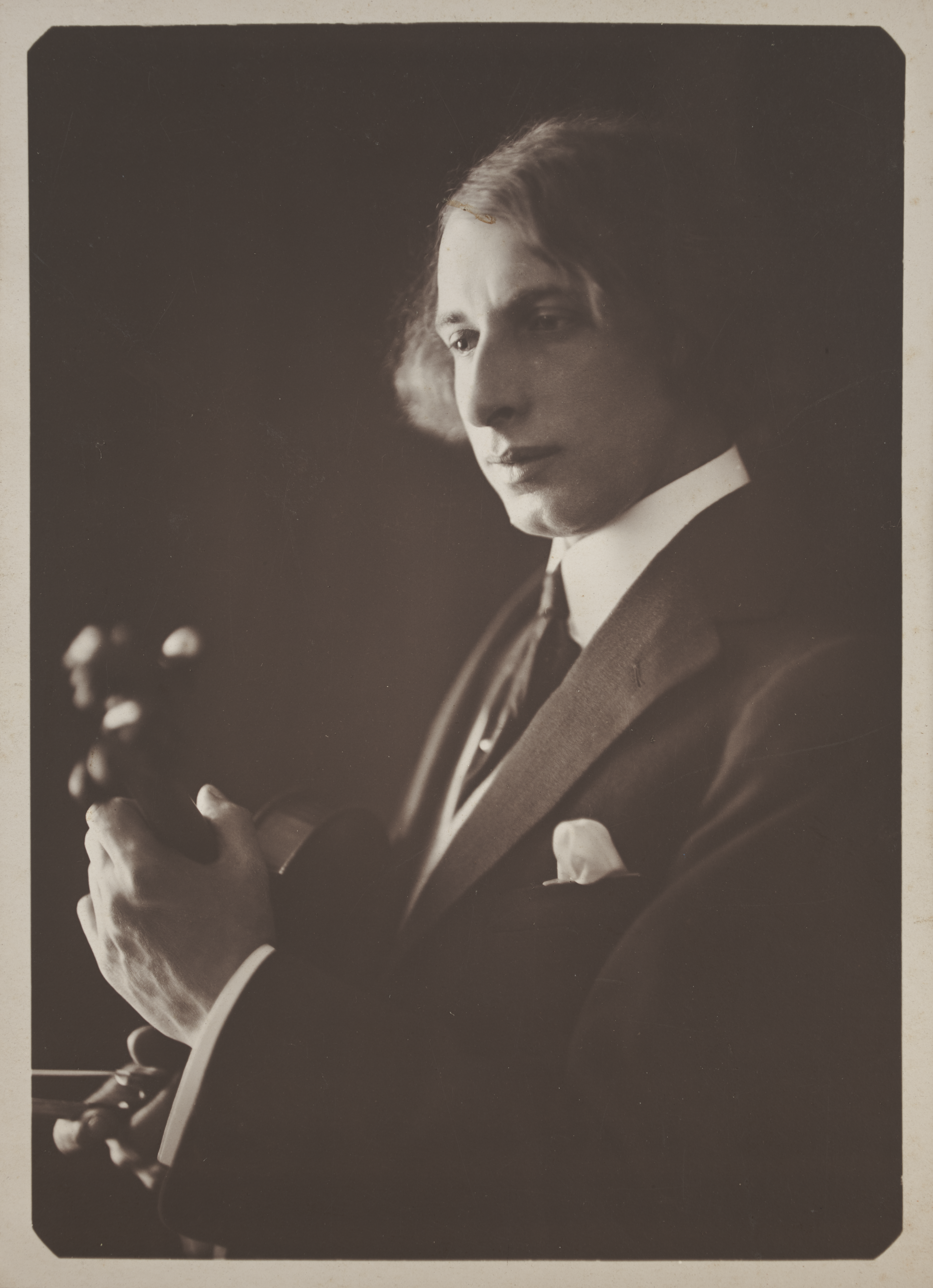
- Stanislaw Victor de Tarczynski c1912-13

Background information
- Born: 7 April 1882; Warsaw, Poland
- Died: June 18, 1952 (aged 70); Melbourne, Victoria, Australia
- Occupation: musician
- Instrument: violin

Stanislaw Victor de Tarczyński (1882–1952) was a Polish-Australian violinist and music teacher.

== Life and career ==
Born in Warsaw, Stanislaw Victor de Tarczynski was educated at the Warsaw Conservatorium, where his father was professor. Following this, he spent one year as violinist with the Moscow Grand Opera before returning to Poland. He was a student of Grażyna Bacewicz, before he continued his studies at the Berlin Hochschule under Henry Marteau, and led the Ysaÿe Symphony Orchestra in Brussels.

He arrived in Australia in 1912, initially as a tourist, but was forced to change his status to immigrant, after the outbreak of war in Europe meant he was unable to return home. He initially played violin in theatres in Melbourne, and later taught at the University of Melbourne's Conservatorium of Music and the Albert Street Conservatorium. He was made leader of the Melbourne Symphony Orchestra and from 1936 led the Adelaide Symphony Orchestra.

Stanislaw Victor de Tarczynsk became an Australian citizen in 1940. He died in Melbourne in 1952 and was cremated. He had three children, two sons and a daughter. His daughter Halinka Tarczynska-Fiddian was an opera singer with the National Opera and music teacher.

A portrait of Stanislaw Victor de Tarczynsk by Colin Colohan was entered into the Archibald prize in 1932. It was later transported to London where it was destroyed during The Blitz. A copy by Joanna Lang was commissioned and unveiled at the Albion Polish Club in 2022.
