= Torva 15 =

British single-seat glider, 1971

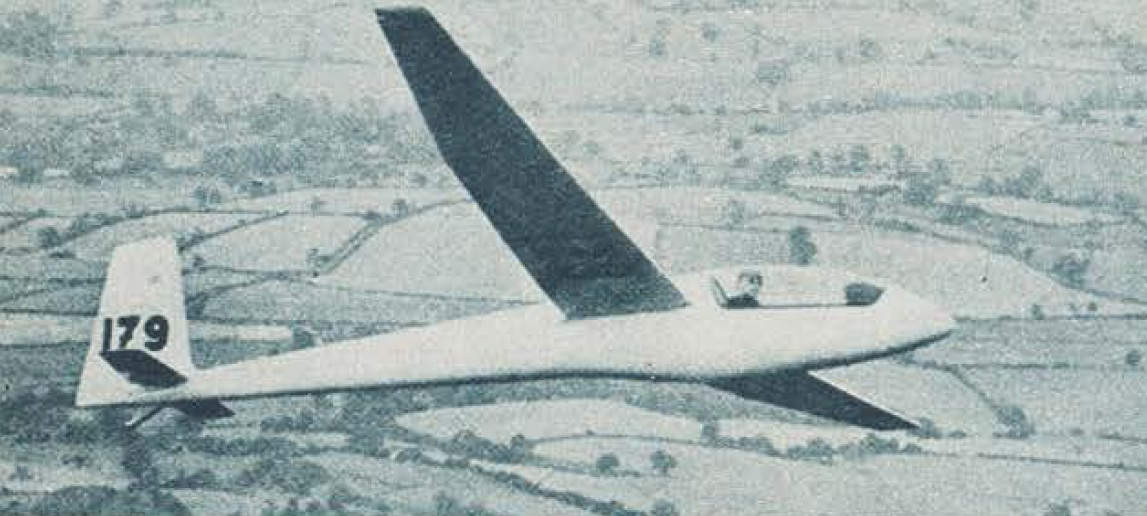

General information
- Type: Glider
- National origin: United Kingdom
- Manufacturer: Torva Sailplanes
- Designer: John Sellars
- Number built: 2

History
- First flight: 8 May 1971

The Torva 15 was a single-seat glider designed and built in the United Kingdom from 1970.

== Development ==
The Torva 15 was designed as a reasonably priced single-seat glider, with reasonable performance, suitable for club and competition flying. Two versions were designed; one with flaps, retractable main-wheel and provision for water ballast named Sport, and one with fixed undercarriage covered by a fairing, called Sprite. Construction of the Torva 15 gliders was of glass fibre with foam filling and plywood frames ribs and reinforcement. The specially modified Wortmann aerofoil section endowed the Torva 15s with good climb performance in typical British weak thermals and reduced the stalling speed to allow easy field landings.

The smooth lines of the fuselage were unbroken by the one-piece canopy, which hinged to the side to allow easy access to the comfortable cockpit, with the tail section, integral with the rear fuselage, supporting a cruciform style tail assembly. Large airbrakes in the wings allowed for accurate landings and approach control as well as limiting the maximum speed attainable. The first flight of the Torva 15 Sport, piloted by Chris Riddell, was on 8 May 1971. The Torva company was closed before production could start and the two prototypes were acquired by Chris Riddell.

== Intended Market ==
The Torva 15 was designed to be moderately priced and good performance for clubs, private owners, and competition flyers.

== Variants ==
- Torva 15 Sport – The 15 m (49 ft) flapped aircraft with retractable undercarriage and provision for water ballast for advanced and competition flying.
- Torva 15 Sprite – The club flying version with no flaps and fixed undercarriage.

== Specifications (Torva 15 Sport) ==
Data from Coates, Andrew. Jane's World Sailplanes and Motor Gliders new edition. London, Jane's. 1980. ISBN 0-7106-0017-8

General characteristics

- Crew: 1
- Length: 23 ft 4 in (7.11 m)
- Wingspan: 49 ft 2.5 in (15 m)
- Wing area: 121.5 sq ft (11.3 m^{2})
- Aspect ratio: 20:1
- Airfoil: Modified Wortmann
- Empty weight: 525 lb (238 kg)
- Gross weight: 900 lb (408 kg)

Performance

- Maximum speed: 134.2 mph (216 km/h, 116.5 kn)
- Stall speed: 40.4 mph (65 km/h, 35 kn)
- Maximum glide ratio: 37 at 82 km/h (44 kts / 51 mph)
- Rate of sink: 121.8 ft/min (0.62 m/s) at 81 km/h (43 kts/50 mph)

== See also ==
Aircraft of comparable role, configuration, and era

- Grob Astir CS

Related lists

- List of gliders
