= TeST TST-5 Variant =

Czech homebuilt aircraft

TST-5 Variant
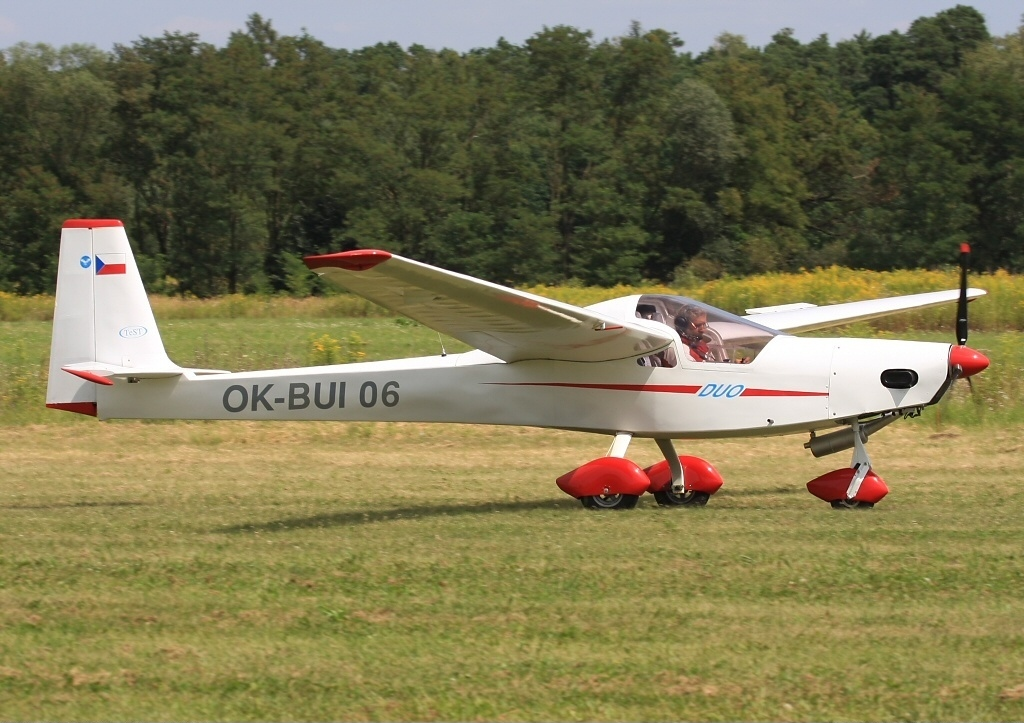
- TST-5 Variant Duo

General information
- Type: Homebuilt aircraft
- National origin: Czech Republic
- Manufacturer: TeST Gliders
- Status: Production completed

History
- Introduction date: circa 1998

The TeST TST-5 Variant is a Czech homebuilt aircraft that was designed and produced by TeST Gliders of Brno, introduced c. 1998. When it was available the aircraft was supplied as a completely assembled aircraft, without engine or instruments, and also as a kit for amateur construction.

== Design and development ==
The TST-5 Variant features a cantilever shoulder-wing, a single seat in enclosed cockpit under a plexiglass canopy, fixed tricycle landing gear with wheel pants and a single engine in tractor configuration.

The aircraft is of all-wood construction. Its constant-chord wing with a NACA 4415 airfoil is intended to give docile handling and is supported by "V"-struts. The standard engine used is the M-125 powerplant.

The manufacturer estimated the construction time from the supplied "express-built" kit as 250 hours.

== Variants ==
TST-5 Variant
Original model with constant chord, strut-braced wing
TST-5 Variant Duo
Model with tapered cantilever wing

== Specifications (TST-5 Variant) ==
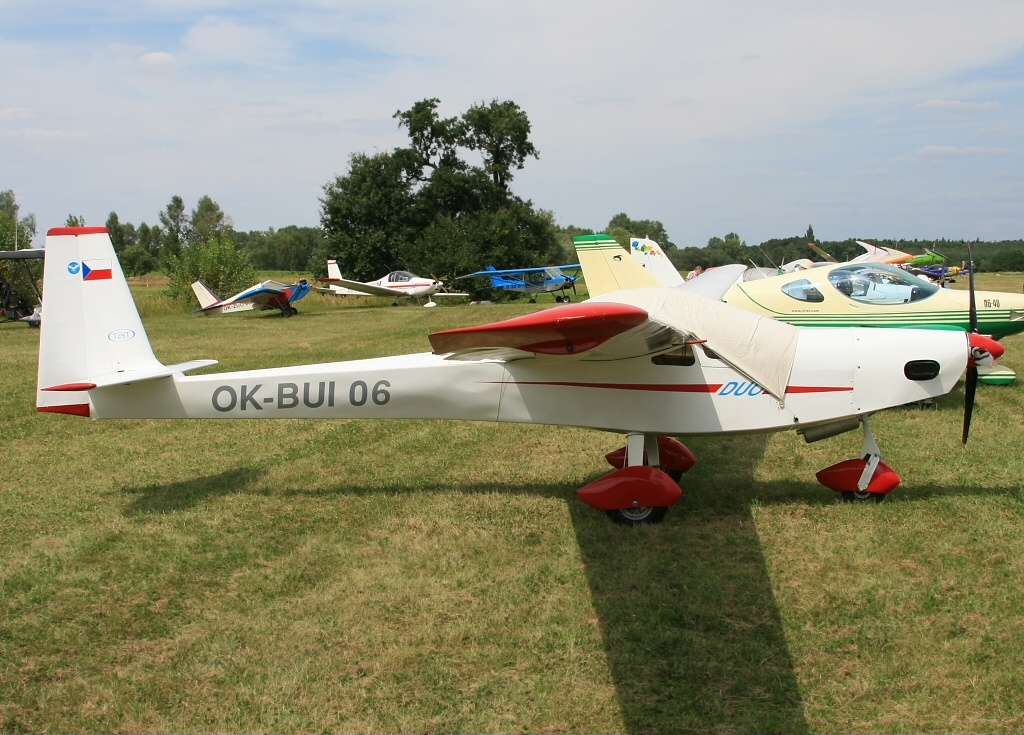
TeST TST-5 Variant Duo

Data from AeroCrafter and The Incomplete Guide to Airfoil Usage, Jane's all the World's Aircraft 2004–05

General characteristics

- Crew: one
- Capacity: one passenger
- Length: 6.4 m (21 ft 0 in)
- Wingspan: 10.5 m (34 ft 5 in)
- Height: 2.3 m (7 ft 7 in)
- Wing area: 13.7 m^{2} (147 sq ft)
- Aspect ratio: 8
- Airfoil: NACA 4415
- Empty weight: 260 kg (573 lb)
- Max takeoff weight: 450 kg (992 lb)
- Fuel capacity: 36 L (9.5 US gal; 7.9 imp gal)
- Powerplant: 1 × Rotax 582 UL 2-cylinder 2-stroke liquid-cooled piston engine, 47.8 kW (64.1 hp)
- Propellers: 2-bladed fixed pitch propeller

Performance

- Cruise speed: 150 km/h (93 mph, 81 kn) max; 90–120 km/h (56–75 mph; 49–65 kn) economical
- Stall speed: 65 km/h (40 mph, 35 kn)
- Never exceed speed: 170 km/h (110 mph, 92 kn)
- Service ceiling: 4,000 m (13,000 ft)
- g limits: +4 / -2
- Rate of climb: 3.5 m/s (690 ft/min)
