= TeST TST-6 Duo =

Czech motorglider

TST-6 Duo

General information
- Type: Motor glider
- National origin: Czech Republic
- Manufacturer: TeST
- Status: Production completed
- Number built: 6 (1998)

The TeST TST-6 Duo is a Czech shoulder-wing, two-seats in side-by-side configuration motor glider that was designed and produced by TeST of Brno.

== Design and development ==
The TST-6 was designed as a two-place touring motorglider. Production is complete and the aircraft is no longer available.

The TST-6 is of mixed wood and fibreglass construction. The 14.7 m (48.2 ft) span forward-swept wings feature both top surface air brakes and flaps and employ a Wortmann FX 61-184 airfoil. The two occupants are housed in a 107 cm (42 in) wide cockpit, under a single piece bubble canopy that is rear-hinged and are provided with dual controls and adjustable rudder pedals. Both the wings and tailplane are removable for transportation or storage. The landing gear is fixed tricycle gear and fits wheel pants. The standard engine provided was the custom M-215 of 37 kW (50 hp), although other similar engines of 37 to 63 kW (50 to 84 hp) can be fitted, including the 48 kW (64 hp) Rotax 582. The engine is nose-mounted in tractor configuration and drives a three-bladed, ground adjustable, wooden-bladed propeller.

The aircraft was available as plans, a standard 400 hour construction kit, a 300-hour construction "Express-Built" kit or as factory-completed and ready-to-fly. In 1998, the factory-completed aircraft, less engine, was US$18,000. In December 2000, the complete aircraft with Rotax 582 powerplant was US$29,500, the aircraft without engine was US$21,200 and plans were US$350.

== Specifications (TST-6) ==
Data from Purdy

General characteristics

- Crew: one
- Capacity: one passenger
- Length: 6.4 m (21.1 ft)
- Wingspan: 14.7 m (48.1 ft)
- Wing area: 12.4 m^{2} (134 sq ft)
- Airfoil: Wortmann FX 61-184
- Empty weight: 227 kg (500 lb)
- Gross weight: 449 kg (990 lb)
- Fuel capacity: 38 litres (8.4 imp gal; 10 US gal)
- Powerplant: 1 × M-215 , 37 kW (50 hp)
- Propellers: 3-bladed wooden bladed, ground adjustable

Performance

- Maximum speed: 180 km/h (110 mph, 96 kn)
- Cruise speed: 105 km/h (65 mph, 56 kn)
- Stall speed: 61 km/h (38 mph, 33 kn) in landing configuration
- Range: 350 km (220 mi, 190 nmi)
- Service ceiling: 3,000 m (10,000 ft)
- Rate of climb: 4.1 m/s (800 ft/min)

== See also ==
- List of gliders
