= Teichfuss LT.12 Biposto =

LT.12 Biposto

General information
- Type: Training glider
- National origin: Italy
- Manufacturer: F.A.L. Teichfuss (Fabrica Alianti Teichfuss), la Aie, Pavulla
- Designer: Luigi Teichfluss
- Number built: 3

History
- First flight: 1933

The Teichfuss LT.12 Biposto (English: two-seat) was an Italian tandem seat primary glider designed by Luigi Teichfuss and flown in 1933.

== Design and development ==
Before World War II, most glider pilots made their first flights solo on low cost single seat aircraft like the Zögling, even though those starting to fly powered aircraft flew with an instructor in a dual control machine. Luigi Teichfuss saw the advantages of ab initio dual control training early in the 1930s and began the design of his LT.12 in 1932. It was intended to be simple and robust.

The LT.12 was a braced high-wing monoplane, with a wing that was rectangular in plan out to very near the blunt tips where the chord reduced slightly. The wing was held high over the fuselage on two plywood covered pillars like a cut-away pedestal, forward and aft of the rear, underwing, open cockpit. The forward cockpit was ahead of the leading edge. Two parallel faired struts braced the wing on each side from about mid-span to the lower fuselage longerons. The fuselage was a deep sided, almost rectangular hexagonal, plywood skinned wooden structure which tapered to the tail. The LT.12's tailplane was mounted on top of the fuselage, with a straight, swept leading edge and carrying balanced elevators, the balances reducing the leading edge sweep outboard. The small fin was triangular, carrying a broad balanced rudder which moved in an elevator cut-out. The LT.12 had both a standard landing skid from nose to below the wing trailing edge combined with a rudder protecting tail bumper and a narrow track wheeled undercarriage, attached to the skid on half axles and with trailing struts.

At least one LT.12 was used for pilot training by the Pavulla club and some of the three built were sold to other aero clubs.

== Operators ==
- Pavulla training school

== Specifications ==
Data from Pedrielli (2011) pp.40-1

General characteristics

- Crew: Two
- Length: 8.22 m (27 ft 0 in)
- Wingspan: 15.40 m (50 ft 6 in)
- Wing area: 28 m^{2} (300 sq ft)
- Aspect ratio: 8.50
- Empty weight: 331 kg (730 lb)
- Gross weight: 481 kg (1,060 lb)

Performance

- Maximum glide ratio: 16:1 at 65 km/h (40 mph)
- Rate of sink: 1.05 m/s (207 ft/min) minimum
- Wing loading: 17 kg/m^{2} (3.5 lb/sq ft)

== See also ==
Related lists

- List of gliders
