= Teichfuss Tenax =

Tenax

General information
- Type: High performance glider
- National origin: Italy
- Manufacturer: Luigi Teichfuss
- Designer: Luigi Teichfuss
- Number built: 1

History
- First flight: 1926

The Teichfuss Tenax was an Italian, one-off, single seat glider, designed and built by Luigi Treichfuss in 1926 and influenced by German developments.

== Design and development ==
Luigi Teichfuss took part in the First International Gliding Competition, held on Monte Sisemol near Asiago in October 1924, with a glider of his own design, the poorly documented Condor. At the competition he saw several German gliders, including the 1922 Geheimrat, the 1923 Konsul and the Moritz and these influenced the 1926 Tenax, his next design.

The Tenax was a high wing braced monoplane with a two spar wing. Initially it had two bracing struts on each side but later just one, joining the lower fuselage to the wing at about one quarter span. The central third of the wing was rectangular in plan apart from a shallow cut-out in the trailing edge; the outboard panels were straight tapered to straight wing tips. At 12.25 its aspect ratio was between that of the Geheimrat (9.9) and the Konsul (15.8). The wing was largely fabric covered.

Its fuselage was rectangular in cross section, plywood covered and tapered strongly to the tail. The high aspect ratio tailplane and elevators were mounted at the extreme tail at mid-fuselage and were almost rectangular in plan, as was the narrow, tall rudder, mounted slightly further forward. The pilot had an open cockpit immediately forward of the leading edge. There was a small skid on the forward fuselage underside for landings assisted by a generous wire rear skid.

The Tenax made its first flights in 1926, piloted by Umberto Nannini. On some occasions at least, the Tenax was winch launched. Its performance was sufficiently encouraging for an attempt on the Italian distance record, which then stood at 11.5 km (7.1 mi), held from December 1926 by Ettore Cattaneo in the Abate GP.1, but Nannini had to make a rather rough landing on an old, stony river bed after 9 km (5.6 mi).

Only one Tenax was built.

== Specifications ==
Data from Pedrielli (2011) pp.28-9

General characteristics

- Capacity: One
- Length: 5 m (16 ft 5 in)
- Wingspan: 14 m (45 ft 11 in)
- Wing area: 16 m^{2} (170 sq ft)
- Aspect ratio: 12.25
- Empty weight: 130 kg (287 lb)
- Gross weight: 210 kg (463 lb)

Performance

- Maximum glide ratio: estimated 17:1
- Wing loading: 13 kg/m^{2} (2.7 lb/sq ft)

== See also ==
Related lists

- List of gliders
