= Italian ship Nibbio =

Nibbio has been the name of at least two ships of the Italian Navy and may refer to:

- NMS Mărășești, a Vifor-class destroyer ordered by Romania as Vârtej. Seized in 1915 by Italy, renamed Nibbio before her launch in 1918, and completed as a scout cruiser. Purchased again by Romania in 1920, reclassified as a destroyer, and renamed Mărășești.
- Italian patrol boat Nibbio (P 421), a Sparviero-class patrol boat launched in 1980 and retired in 1998.
