= Teichfuss Grifo =

Grifo

General information
- Type: Training glider
- National origin: Italy
- Manufacturer: F.A.L. Teichfuss (Fabrica Alianti Teichfuss), la Aie, Pavulla
- Designer: Luigi Teichfluss
- Number built: 3

History
- First flight: 1934
- Developed from: Teichfuss Nibio I

The Teichfuss Grifo was an Italian training glider designed by Luigi Teichfuss and flown in 1934. It was built in small numbers.

== Design and development ==
The Grifo single-seat trainer was intended as an improved version of the Teichfuss Nibio I. It was a braced high-wing monoplane, with a single spar wing. Apart from full rounded wing tips the wing was rectangular in plan, with plywood covering from the spar forward around the leading edge forming a torsion resisting D-box. Aft of the spar the wing was fabric-covered. Ailerons occupied more than half the span. The wing was held over the fuselage on a pedestal and braced on each side by a pair of parallel faired struts to the lower fuselage.

The Grifo's fuselage was a ply covered wooden hexagonal structure with deep sides. The open cockpit, fitted with a small windscreen, was immediately ahead of the pedestal which dropped rapidly away to the upper fuselage behind the trailing edge. All the tail surfaces were straight-tapered and straight-tipped, with the tailplane mounted on top of the fuselage and carrying unbalanced elevators. The fin was small but mounted a large, balanced rudder which extended down to the keel, working in an elevator cut-out and provided with a protecting tail bumper. The Grifo's landing skid, equipped with rubber shock absorbers, was short, only reaching as far aft as the forward wing strut.

The Grifo first flew in 1934. Three were built and used by flying clubs.

== Specifications ==
Data from Pedrielli (2011) pp.42-3

General characteristics

- Crew: One
- Length: 6.53 m (21 ft 5 in)
- Wingspan: 14.20 m (46 ft 7 in)
- Wing area: 16 m^{2} (170 sq ft)
- Aspect ratio: 12.60
- Empty weight: 135 kg (298 lb)
- Gross weight: 220 kg (485 lb)

Performance

- Maximum glide ratio: estimated 17:1
- Rate of sink: 0.9 m/s (180 ft/min) minimum
- Wing loading: 12.9 kg/m^{2} (2.6 lb/sq ft)

== See also ==
Related lists

- List of gliders
