= Teichfuss Sparviero =

Aerobatic glider

Sparviero

General information
- Type: Single seat aerobatic glider
- National origin: Italy
- Manufacturer: F.A.L. Teichfuss (Fabrica Alianti Teichfuss), la Aie, Pavullo
- Designer: Luigi Teichfuss

History
- First flight: 13 April 1938

The Teichfuss Sparviero (English: Sparrowhawk) was an Italian single seat aerobatic glider, designed by Luigi Teichfuss and flown in 1938.

== Design and development ==
The Sparviero design, begun in 1937, was intended as an aerobatic competition glider comparable with the 1936 DFS Habicht. It was a mid wing cantilever monoplane with gull wings and straight tapered, rounded tipped plan. The inner panels extended over less than one third span and were mounted with about 10° of dihedral; there was no dihedral outboard but the trailing edges of these outer panels was completely occupied with ailerons. There were no flaps or spoilers.

Its fuselage was ovoid in cross-section and plywood skinned, tapering markedly towards the tail. At the time of the first flight in April 1938 the Sparviero's cockpit was covered with a multi-framed canopy which extended from well behind the nose to the wing leading edge, blending smoothly into both upper nose and rear fuselage lines but limiting the pilot's forward view. By August 1938 the canopy glazing had been extended forward to form the nose profile and enhance the view. The horizontal tail, like the wing was straight tapered and round tipped. The tailplane was mounted over the fuselage on a short pedestal and strut braced from below. Its elevators were both mass and aerodynamically balanced and had a cut-out between them for rudder movement. There was no fin but the aerodynamically balanced rudder was broad and roughly D-shaped, extending down to the keel. The Sparviero landed on a skid which extended from the nose to under mid-chord, aided by a shallow tail bumper.

The Sparviero first flew on 13 April 1938, flown by Adriano Mantelli from an airfield near Bologna. The following month Mantelli flew it from Bolongna to Rome where on the 15 May, during a visit from Adolf Hitler it gave a well received aerobatic demonstration. Shortly after that, Mantelli and the Sparviero were in Bern, flying in a competition held during the International Study Commission for Gliding's International Congress. Hanna Reitsch was also there and for a while the two pilots exchanged aircraft. In August it was flown, as part of the Pavullo team, by Captain Laurin in the Second Asiago National Gliding Competition.

Only one Sarviero was built.

== Specifications ==
Data from Pedrielli (2011) pp.50-2

General characteristics

- Capacity: One
- Length: 7.16 m (23 ft 6 in)
- Wingspan: 16 m (52 ft 6 in)
- Wing area: 17.40 m^{2} (187.3 sq ft)
- Aspect ratio: 14.8
- Airfoil: Göttigen 532 root, NACA M12 tip
- Empty weight: 315 kg (694 lb)
- Gross weight: 400 kg (882 lb)

Performance

- Maximum speed: 200 km/h (120 mph, 110 kn)
- Stall speed: 66 km/h (41 mph, 36 kn)
- Maximum glide ratio: estimated 24:1
- Rate of sink: 0.78 m/s (154 ft/min) minimum, at 80 km/h (50 mph)
- Wing loading: 23.5 kg/m^{2} (4.8 lb/sq ft)

== See also ==
Related lists

- List of gliders
