= TeST Gliders =

Czech sailplane manufacturer

- Industry: Aerospace
- Defunct: 5 May 2010
- Headquarters: Brno, Czech Republic
- Products: Gliders
- Website: www.lsa-gliders.com

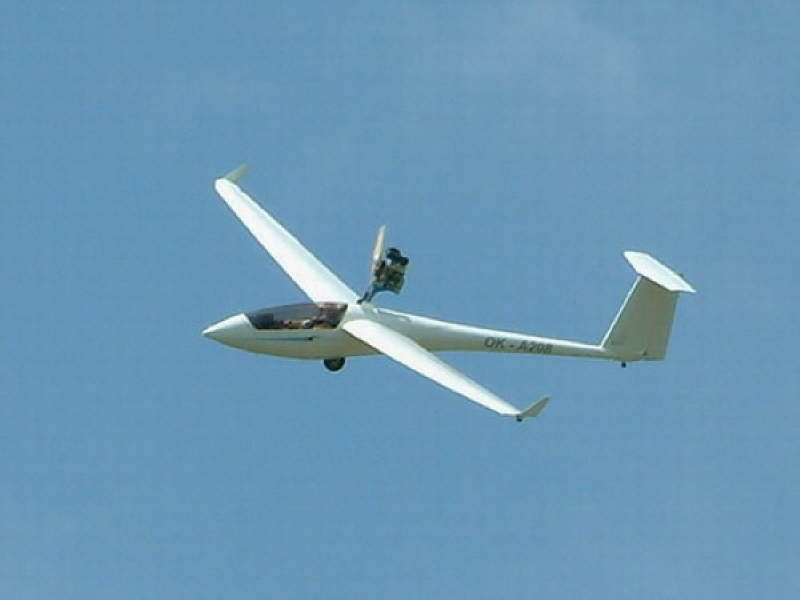
TeST TST-10 Atlas

TeST Gliders was a manufacturer of ultralight sailplanes and motorgliders based in Brno, Czech Republic.

== Aircraft produced ==
- TeST TST-1 Alpin
- TeST TST-3 Alpin T
- TeST TST-5 Variant
- TeST TST-6 Duo
- TeST TST-7 Junior
- TeST TST Alpin 8 DM 2 Seat self launch glider
- TeST TST-9 Junior
- TeST TST-10 Atlas single seat glider (variants M, MB)
- TeST TST-13 Junior single seat touring motorglider
- TeST TST-14 Bonus 2 seat glider (variants M, MB, J)
- TeST TST-14 M Bonus 2 seat self launch glider
- TeST TST-14J BonusJet 2 seat jet powered self-launching sailplane
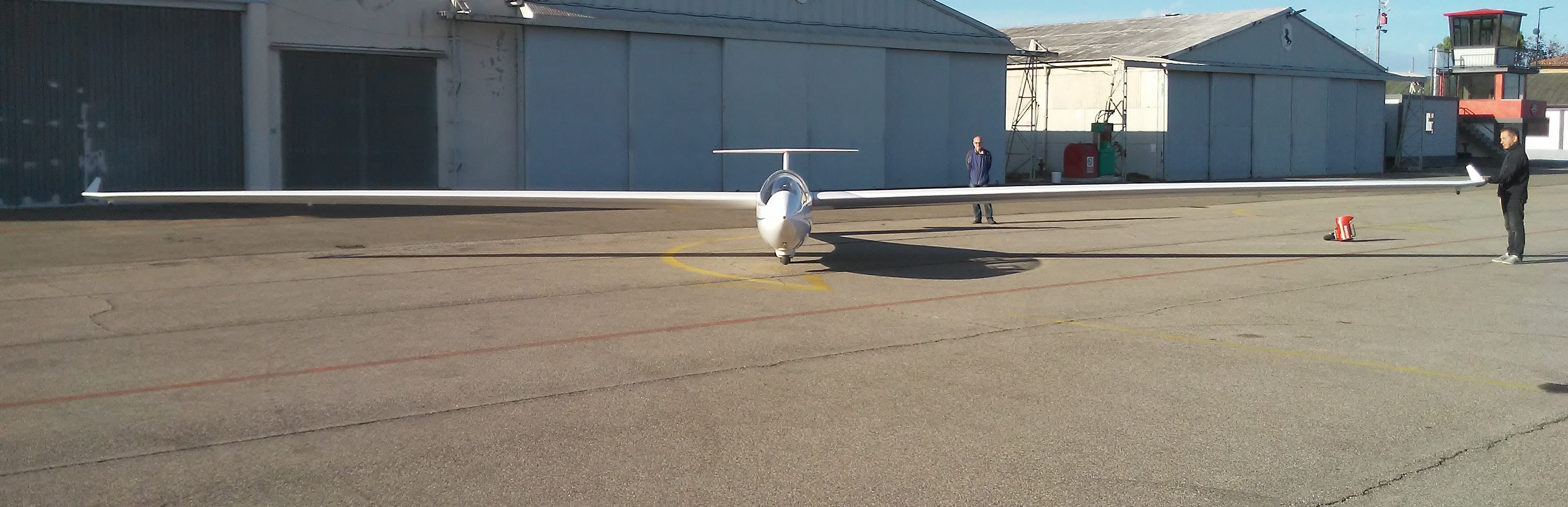
  TeST TST-14 Bonus M
