= Ballarat Heritage Services =

- Type: Publishing House; historical research
- Genre: History Education
- Founded: Ballarat, Australia
- Founder: Clare Gervasoni, Dorothy Wickham, Wayne Phillipson
- Headquarters: Ballarat, Australia
- Products: Books
- Services: Publishing books, curatorial and heritage interpretation, historical research

Ballarat Heritage Services, also known as BHS Publishing, is an Australian publisher in Ballarat, Victoria. It was founded in 1998 by Clare Gervasoni, Dorothy Wickham and Wayne Phillipson, to promote Victorian local and family history in historical gold mining towns of the Victorian gold rush. It also distributes historical and specialist publications which are difficult to locate.

Ballarat Heritage Services published The Eureka Encyclopaedia, an encyclopaedia of the Eureka Rebellion written by Justin Corfield, Wickham and Gervasoni. The Encyclopaedia won the Victorian Community History Awards.

== Bibliography ==
- Webb, Carolyn (December 19, 2005). "How Hepburn Springs tapped its rivers of gold". The Age.
- Swiss Italian Festa
- Ballarat Courier article on Prime Ministers Australian History Prize nomination
