= TeST TST-7 Junior =

Czech motorglider

TST-7 Junior

General information
- Type: Motor glider
- National origin: Czech Republic
- Manufacturer: TeST
- Status: Production completed
- Number built: 5 (1998)

History
- Developed from: TeST TST-1 Alpin
- Variant: TeST TST-9 Junior

The TeST TST-7 Junior is a Czech shoulder-wing, single-seat motor glider that was designed and produced by TeST of Brno. When it was available the aircraft was supplied as plans, in kit form for amateur construction or as a complete ready-to-fly aircraft. Production is now complete and the aircraft is no longer available new.

== Design and development ==
The TST-7 Junior was a development of the TST-1 Alpine self-launching sailplane, with a design goal of producing an aircraft more suited for use as a touring motor glider with docile handling.

The TST-7 is built from wood, with some fibreglass parts. The 12.6 m (41.3 ft) span, shoulder-mounted, slightly forward-swept wing employs a Wortmann FX 61-184 airfoil and has top-surface air brakes. The landing gear is of tricycle configuration, making ground handling the aircraft much easier than the monowheel gear used on the TST-1. The standard engine was initially the custom-built M 125 of 30 kW (40 hp) and later the Rotax 447 of 30 kW (40 hp). The aircraft can accept engines of 30 to 37 kW (40 to 50 hp). The cabin width is 58 cm (23 in).

The aircraft was supplied as a standard kit rated at 400 hours for completion and that did not include the powerplant. An Express-Build kit was also available that could be completed in 250 hours. The factory also built some TST-7s as ready-to-fly models that were US$16,250 in 1998 with the M 125 engine and US$17,540 in 2000 with the Rotax powerplant. The plans cost US$350 in 2000.

== Specifications (TST-7 Junior) ==
Data from Purdy and Kitplanes

General characteristics

- Crew: one
- Length: 5.85 m (19.20 ft)
- Wingspan: 12.6 m (41.3 ft)
- Wing area: 11.09 m^{2} (119.4 sq ft)
- Airfoil: Wortmann FX 61-184
- Empty weight: 179 kg (395 lb)
- Gross weight: 294 kg (649 lb)
- Fuel capacity: 19 litres (4.2 imp gal; 5.0 US gal)
- Powerplant: 1 × M 125 two stroke, 30 kW (40 hp)
- Propellers: 2-bladed feathering

Performance

- Maximum speed: 180 km/h (110 mph, 96 kn)
- Cruise speed: 121 km/h (75 mph, 65 kn)
- Stall speed: 60 km/h (37 mph, 32 kn) in the landing configuration
- Range: 370 km (230 mi, 200 nmi)
- Service ceiling: 3,700 m (12,000 ft)
- Rate of climb: 4.6 m/s (900 ft/min)

== See also ==
- List of gliders
