= Teichfuss Turbine =

Turbine

General information
- Type: Single seat high performance glider
- National origin: Italy
- Manufacturer: F.A.L. Teichfuss (Fabrica Alianti Teichfuss), la Aie, Pavullo
- Designer: Luigi Teichfuss
- Number built: 1

History
- First flight: 27 July 1939

The Teichfuss Turbine was an Italian single seat high performance glider, designed by Luigi Teichfuss and flown in 1939.

== Design and development ==
On one of his regular visits to German glider builders, Teichfuss watched the construction of high performance aircraft like Hans Jacobs' DFS Reiher. The Turbine design, begun in 1938, was a high performance machine which showed Jakob's influence but was rather simpler to construct. It was a mid wing cantilever monoplane with gull wings of strongly straight tapered, elliptically tipped plan. The inner panels extended over rather more than one third span and were mounted with about 10° of dihedral; there was no dihedral outboard but the trailing edges of these outer panels was completely occupied with ailerons. There were spoilers on the inner panels at about mid-chord.

Its fuselage was ovoid in cross-section and plywood skinned, tapering markedly towards the tail. The long, multi-framed canopy glazing extended forward to form the nose profile and provide a clear view forward. The horizontal tail, like the wing was straight tapered and round tipped. The cantilever tailplane was mounted over the fuselage on a short pedestal, its elevators having a cut-out between them for rudder movement. There was no fin but the aerodynamically balanced rudder was broad and roughly D-shaped, extending down to the keel where its underside was protected by a long tail bumper. The Turbine landed not on a skid but a small, semi-recessed monowheel located under the wing.

The Turbine first flew on 27 July 1939, flown by Adriano Mantelli. In early August he flew it at the Third Asiago National Gliding Competition then went to the World Student Competition near Vienna just a few days before the outbreak of World War II.

Despite the structural simplifications Teichfuss had made in the hope of small series production, only one Turbine was built.

== Specifications ==
Data from Pedrielli (2011) pp.53

General characteristics

- Capacity: One
- Length: 7.60 m (24 ft 11 in)
- Wingspan: 18.50 m (60 ft 8 in)
- Height: 1.11 m (3 ft 8 in)
- Wing area: 16 m^{2} (170 sq ft)
- Aspect ratio: 21.4
- Empty weight: 238 kg (525 lb)
- Gross weight: 328 kg (723 lb)

Performance

- Maximum speed: 290 km/h (180 mph, 160 kn)
- Maximum glide ratio: estimated 33:1
- Rate of sink: 0.54 m/s (106 ft/min) minimum
- Wing loading: 21.0 kg/m^{2} (4.3 lb/sq ft)

== See also ==
Related lists

- List of gliders
