= TeST TST-3 Alpin T =

Czech single-seat glider and motor glider

TST-3 Alpin T

General information
- Type: Motor glider and glider
- National origin: Czech Republic
- Manufacturer: TeST
- Status: Production completed
- Number built: 2 (December 2000)

The TeST TST-3 Alpin T (English: Alpine) is a Czech shoulder-wing, T-tailed, single-seat glider and motor glider that was designed and produced by TeST of Brno.

== Design and development ==
The TST-3 was produced in many forms, including as plans and kits or various levels of completion for amateur construction and also as a factory completed aircraft. It was produced as a motor glider with a retractable engine and also as a pure glider. Production is complete and the type is no longer available.

The TST-3 is of mixed construction, using fibreglass, wood and aircraft fabric covering. The 13.4 m (44.0 ft) span wing is equipped with winglets and a Wortmann FX 61-184 airfoil. The tractor configuration Hirth F-33 16 kW (21 hp) motor is mounted on a strut that retracts aft into a bay behind the cockpit and is enclosed by two doors. A Rotax 503 of 37 kW (50 hp) was optional. The landing gear is retractable monowheel gear.

Two were reported to have been completed by December 2000. In December 1998 the glider version was US$13,000. In December 2000 the kit was US$10,000, complete aircraft US$23,300 and the plans US$350. In 2004 the complete aircraft was €22,880.

== Variants ==
TST-3 Alpine TM
Motorized version

== Specifications (TST-3 Alpin TM) ==
Data from World Directory of Leisure Aviation and KitPlanes

General characteristics

- Crew: one
- Length: 5.8 m (19.1 ft)
- Wingspan: 13.4 m (44 ft 0 in)
- Wing area: 10 m^{2} (110 sq ft)
- Airfoil: Wortmann FX 61-184
- Empty weight: 141 kg (310 lb)
- Gross weight: 249 kg (550 lb)
- Powerplant: 1 × Hirth F-33 single cylinder two stroke aircraft engine, 16 kW (22 hp)

Performance

- Stall speed: 62 km/h (39 mph, 33 kn)
- Never exceed speed: 180 km/h (110 mph, 97 kn)
- Maximum glide ratio: 31:1 at 85 km/h (53 mph)
- Rate of sink: 0.75 m/s (148 ft/min)

== See also ==
- List of gliders
