= Teichfuss Borea =

Borea

General information
- Type: High performance glider
- National origin: Italy
- Manufacturer: F.A.L. Teichfuss (Fabrica Alianti Teichfuss), la Aie, Pavullo
- Designer: Luigi Teichfuss
- Number built: 1

History
- First flight: Not flown

The Teichfuss Borea or LT.35 Borea was an Italian high performance glider designed by Luigi Teichfuss. It was completed by 1943 but never flew and the sole example was destroyed during the German occupation of Italy.

== Design and development ==
The Borea was the last Teichfuss glider to be completed. It was a two-seat aircraft, designed primarily for record breaking, a cantilever mid-wing machine with a long span, strongly straight tapered gull wing, ending in elliptical tips. The inner sections of the wing, about one third of the span, had about 10° of dihedral but the outer sections none. Ailerons filled the whole trailing edges of these outer panels. There were airbrakes at mid-chord.

The Borea seated two in side-by side configuration and so its generally ovoid section, plywood covered fuselage was broad and almost circular in the cockpit area. Ahead and overlapping the wing leading edge, the canopy was multi-framed and blended into the fuselage. Aft of the wings the fuselage tapered markedly to the tailplane, which was mounted just above the fuselage on a very short pedestal. The tailplane and elevators together were straight tapered and round tipped, the elevators unbalanced and with a cut-out for rudder movement. A small fin mounted a full, rounded and balanced rudder which reached down to the keel, protected by an underfin/tail bumper.

The Borea was completed but not flown. Pavullo is in the region of Italy occupied by the Germans after the fall of Benito Mussolini in July 1943. When they retreated, the Germans destroyed the buildings and aircraft at Pavullo, including the Borea.

== Specifications ==
Data from Pedrielli (2011) p.61

General characteristics

- Capacity: Two
- Length: 8 m (26 ft 3 in)
- Wingspan: 21 m (68 ft 11 in)
- Height: 1.14 m (3 ft 9 in)
- Wing area: 21.7 m^{2} (234 sq ft)
- Aspect ratio: 20.5
- Airfoil: Göttingen 532
- Empty weight: 376 kg (829 lb)
- Gross weight: 536 kg (1,182 lb)

Performance

- Maximum glide ratio: estimated 32.5:1
- Rate of sink: 0.65 m/s (128 ft/min) minimum
- Wing loading: 24.7 kg/m^{2} (5.1 lb/sq ft)

== See also ==
Related lists

- List of gliders
