= Teichfuss Allievo Pavullo =

Allievo Pavullo

General information
- Type: Single seat primary glider
- National origin: Italy
- Manufacturer: F.A.L. Teichfuss (Fabrica Alianti Teichfuss), la Aie, Pavullo
- Designer: Luigi Teichfuss
- Number built: 14, all variants

History
- First flight: 1940

The Teichfuss Allievo Pavullo (English: Pavullo glider) was an Italian single seat open frame primary glider, designed by Luigi Teichfuss of Pavullo and first flown in 1940. It was sold in two versions, strut and cable braced. A single two seat variant was also built.

== Design and development ==
In 1930 Teichfuss produced the LT.10, a strengthened but otherwise little changed version of the much imitated Zögling. His 1940 Allievo Pavullo was a strengthened Zögling with a plywood skinned nacelle in place of the original exposed, girder supported seat. This nacelle contained the open cockpit, placed just ahead of the wing leading edge and extended up to the wing behind the cockpit and rearwards to enclose the forward cross members of the simple girder fuselage. As on the Zögling these cross members ran in the vertical plane between a horizontal upper beam and a lower beam which sloped upwards to the tail, though their angles were altered so as not to be normal to the top girder. Again like the Zögling, on the wire braced Allievo Pavullo two forward cross members continued above the wing to form a triangular cabane, faired in on the Teichfuss development, to which some wires were attached. This was dispensed with on the strutted variant, which also had an extra frame strut towards the rear and normal to the lower girder.

The wing was very similar in plan to that of the Zögling, rectangular apart from clipped aileron tips, though it had a 1 m (3 ft 3 in) greater span. It was built around two double-T-section spars with diagonal rib reinforcements and mounted on top of the upper girder without dihedral. The wire braced version had steel flying wires from the cabane and from the lower fuselage; the strutted model had faired parallel lift struts on each side from the lower fuselage to the wing. The strutted Allievo Pavullo was 19 kg (42 lb) heavier but more robust and better suited to winch launching; mostly it was preferred by clubs.

The Allievo Pavullo's tail surfaces were all straight edged. Its fin was formed by filling the end of the girder, in Zögling fashion. Its cantilever tailplane, mounted on top of the upper girder, had a sharply swept leading edge and carried elevators with angled tips and a cut-out for rudder movement. The balanced rudder was tapered with a squared tip and reached to the keel. A conventional skid, running from the nose to below the wing trailing edge formed the undercarriage.

The Allievo Pavullo first flew in 1940. Thirteen single seaters were built, all but three the strutted type. It could be used to train novice pilots through to their B-certificate. A two-seat variant, called the Allievo Pavullo Biposto (English: Pavullo two seat glider), was also built with two open cockpits in tandem in a longer and more distinct nacelle. The fuselage structure was quite different, with the tail supported on two parallel booms from the wire braced wing to the tips of a rectangular horizontal tail, assisted by a long, wide spread V-strut from the rear of the nacelle. It had a pair of straight tapered vertical tails, set inboard of the tailplane tips.

== Variants ==
Allievo Pavullo (wire braced)
Wire braced, 3 built.
Allievo Pavullo (strut braced)
Strut braced, 10 built.
Allievo Pavullo Biposto
Two seat, wire braced, 1 built.

== Specifications (strut braced single seat) ==
Data from Pedrielli (2011) p.59

General characteristics

- Capacity: One
- Length: 6.30 m (20 ft 8 in)
- Wingspan: 11 m (36 ft 1 in)
- Wing area: 16.45 m^{2} (177.1 sq ft)
- Aspect ratio: 7.5
- Airfoil: Göttingen 532
- Empty weight: 120 kg (265 lb)
- Gross weight: 195 kg (430 lb)

Performance

- Maximum speed: 140 km/h (87 mph, 76 kn)
- Stall speed: 42 km/h (26 mph, 23 kn)
- Maximum glide ratio: estimated 15:1
- Rate of sink: 1.2 m/s (240 ft/min) minimum, at 45 km/h (28 mph)
- Wing loading: 11.25 kg/m^{2} (2.30 lb/sq ft)

== See also ==
Related lists

- List of gliders
