= TeST TST-14J BonusJet =

TST-14J BonusJet

General information
- Type: Motor glider
- National origin: Czech Republic
- Manufacturer: TeST sro (Division of Comp-Let sro), Velké Meziříĉi, Desert Aerospace, LLC

History
- Developed from: TeST TST-14 Bonus

The TeST TST-14J BonusJet is a two-seat touring motor glider with a retractable PBS TJ-100 turbine engine, built by TeST in the Czech Republic. It is an all composite design.

== Development and design ==
The TST-14J is a Desert Aerospace, LLC modification of the TST-14 motorglider with the addition of a retractable jet engine used for self launching. It has a high T-tail. It is a mid wing design with straight tapered wings. The wing tips carry winglets and there are outboard ailerons, two position flaps and upper surface spoilers.

The fuselage of the TST-14J is built from two half shells which incorporate the straight tapered fin. The fuselage tapers rearwards, producing an arched shape below. The tailplane carries a single piece elevator. The cockpit has a forward hinged, single piece canopy, and a side hinged passenger canopy. The TST-14J has a tailwheel undercarriage, with spatted mainwheels on fuselage-mounted, sprung, cantilever legs.

The 220 lb of thrust PBS TJ-100 turbine engine requires a two-minute cooldown before retracting into the fuselage. The prototype was tested by Bob Carlton, an experienced jet powered glider pilot who flies an aerobatic routine in a Super Salto jet powered glider with the same engine. Sonex Aircraft also uses the same engine, and hired Carlton to test its SubSonex jet-powered homebuilt aircraft.

== Specifications ==
Data from Fly-Low

General characteristics

- Crew: 2
- Wingspan: 17 m (55 ft 9 in)
- Powerplant: 1 × První Brnenská Strojírna PBS TJ-100 , 1 kN (220 lbf) thrust

Performance

- Stall speed: 65 km/h (40 mph, 35 kn)
