= TeST TST-10 Atlas =

Glider made in Czech Republic

TST-10 Atlas
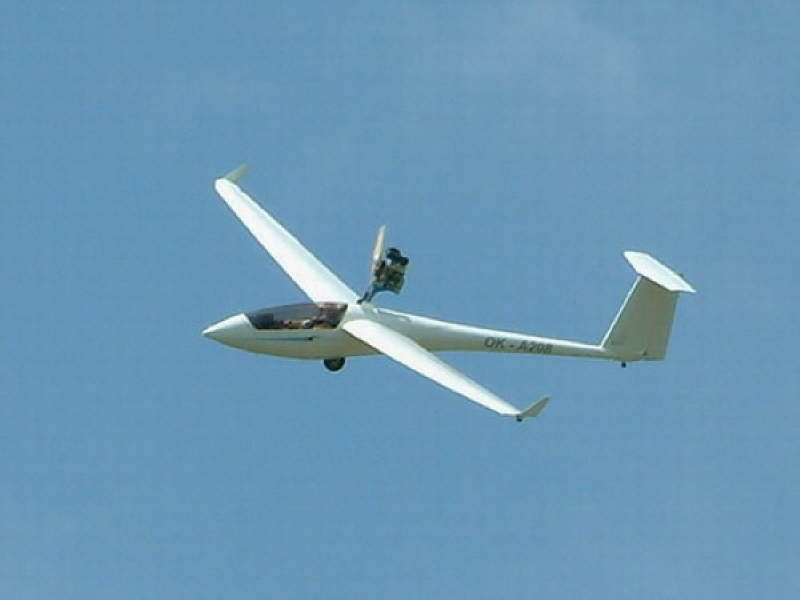

General information
- Type: FAI Ultralight class sailplane
- National origin: Czech Republic
- Manufacturer: TeST

The TeST TST-10 Atlas is a single-seat, standard class sailplane, with a 15 m (49 ft 3 in) wingspan, manufactured by TeST Gliders in The Czech Republic. It is available both as a pure glider (TST-10) and self-launching glider (TST-10M).

== Design and development ==
The TST-10M Atlas was designed for recreational, club-class flying, enhanced by the convenience of self-launching. It is made mostly of composite structure. The fuselage is made in the negative mould together with the fin. The wings also use composite material and have no ribs within the wing. Early iterations of the Atlas utilized a wooden spar of built-up construction; current versions utilize a carbon fiber spar. The typical sailplane monowheel landing gear is fixed; a castering tailwheel and wingtip wheels assist powered taxiing.

Assembly of the glider is typical of modern gliders, with forked wing spars joined by two steel pins. The wings each weigh only 32 kg (71 lb).

The self-launching version is powered by a 30 kW (40 hp) Rotax 447 engine externally mounted on a retractable mast which drives a two-bladed wooden propeller. Engine extension and retraction is performed by an electric motor.

The published glide ratio of the Atlas is 40:1. Best glide speed is 88 km/h (55 mph, 48 kn); V_{NE} is low for a contemporary glider at 180 km/h (110 mph, 97 kn).

An improved variant, the TST-10MB was released in spring 2008. It differences from the original TST-10M in having a retractable undercarriage, automatic connection of controls for wing to fuselage assembly, a new seat shape, a larger fuel tank and optimized winglets.

== Operational history ==
There are roughly 40 TST 10M Atlases flying, two of which are in the United States, where they have been registered with the FAA in the Experimental E-LSA category.

In mid-2010 15 TST-10s appeared on civil aircraft registers of European countries west of Russia.

== Specifications (TST-10M) ==
Data from

General characteristics

- Crew: 1
- Length: 6.87 m (22 ft 6 in)
- Wingspan: 15.00 m (49 ft 3 in)
- Wing area: 9.85 m^{2} (106.0 sq ft)
- Aspect ratio: 22.8
- Fuel capacity: 14 L (3.1 Imp gal, 3.7 US gal)
- Powerplant: 1 × Rotax 447 two cylinder inline two stroke, geared down 2:1, 30 kW (40 hp)
- Propellers: 2-bladed wooden, 1.20 m (3 ft 11 in) diameter

Performance

- Maximum speed: 140 km/h (87 mph, 76 kn) maximum manoeuvring
- Stall speed: 60 km/h (37 mph, 32 kn)
- Never exceed speed: 180 km/h (110 mph, 97 kn)
- Endurance: approximately 1.5 h at cruise power
- g limits: +4/-2
- Maximum glide ratio: 40 at 88 km/h (55 mph, 48 kn), calculated
- Rate of sink: 0.62 m/s (122 ft/min) minimum

== See also ==
Aircraft of comparable role, configuration, and era

- Albastar Apis
