= TeST TST-14 Bonus =

Czech piston-powered motor glider

TST-14 Bonus
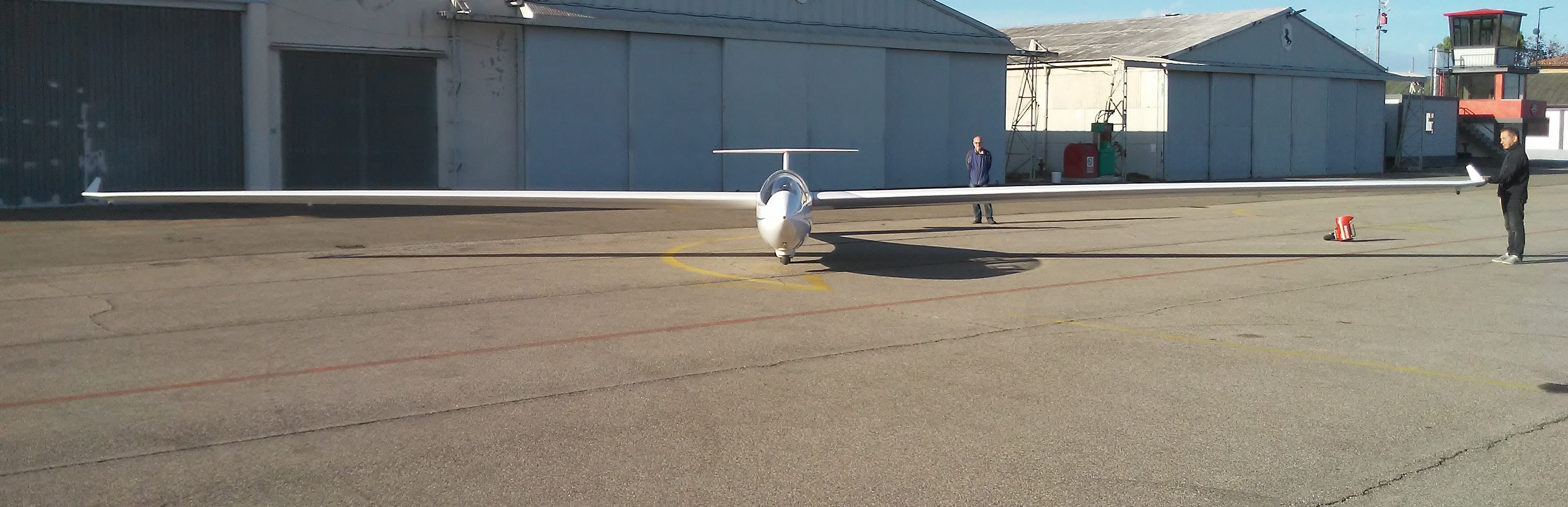
- Frontal view

General information
- Type: Glider and Motor glider
- National origin: Czech Republic
- Manufacturer: TeST Gliders
- Designer: Zdenek Teply
- Status: Produced until 2010
- Number built: About 50

History
- Introduction date: 2001
- First flight: 2005
- Variant: TeST TST-14J BonusJet

The TeST TST-14 Bonus is a Czech mid-wing, T-tailed, two-seats-in-tandem glider and motor glider, designed and produced by TeST Gliders.

== Design and development ==
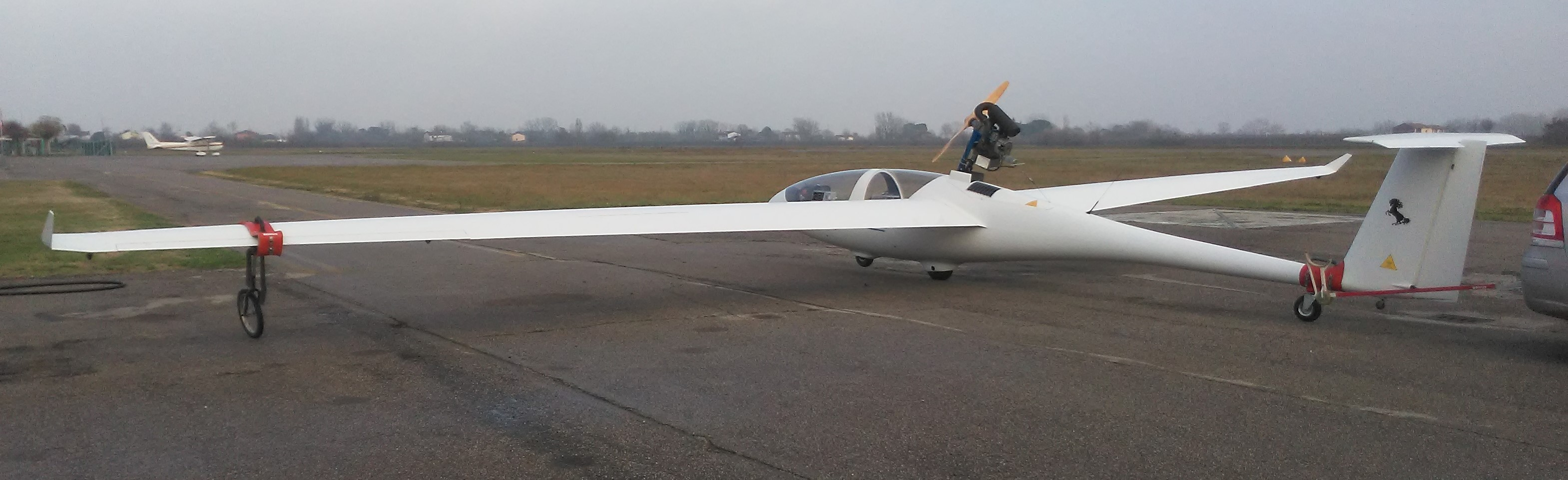
General view with engine

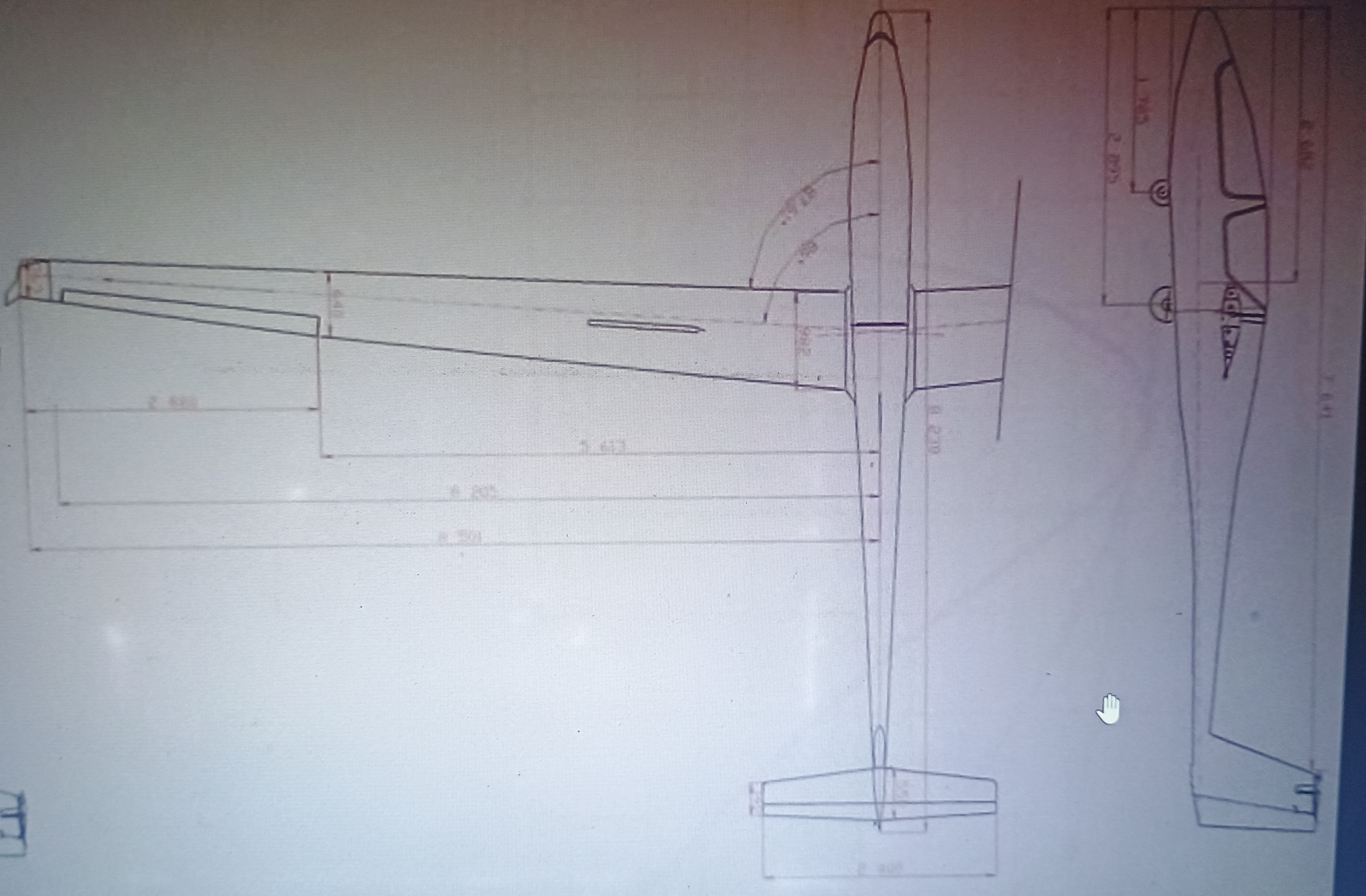
three view diagram

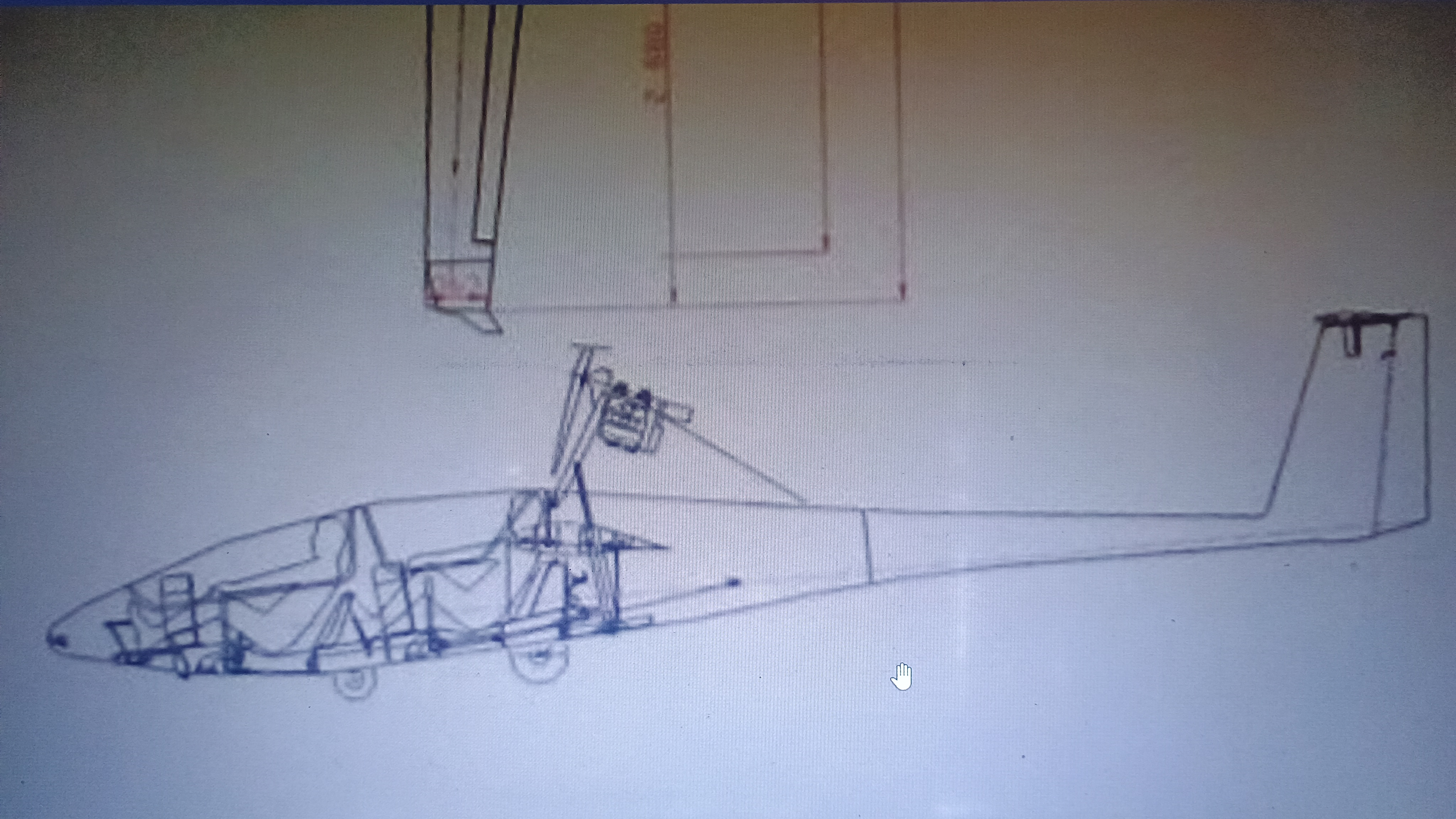
longitudinal section

U.S.A. Certification

French Certification

Czech Rep. Certification

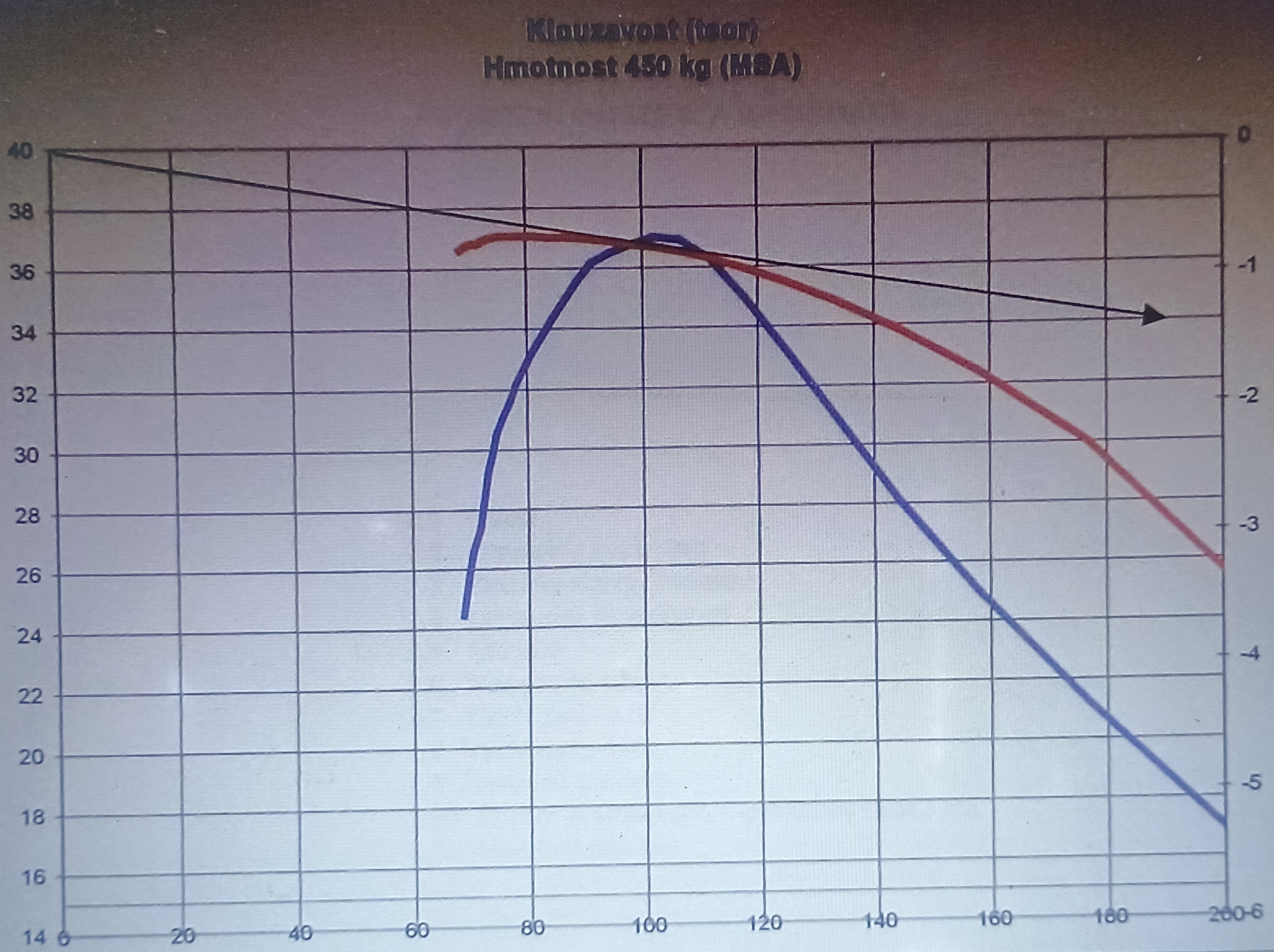
Polar

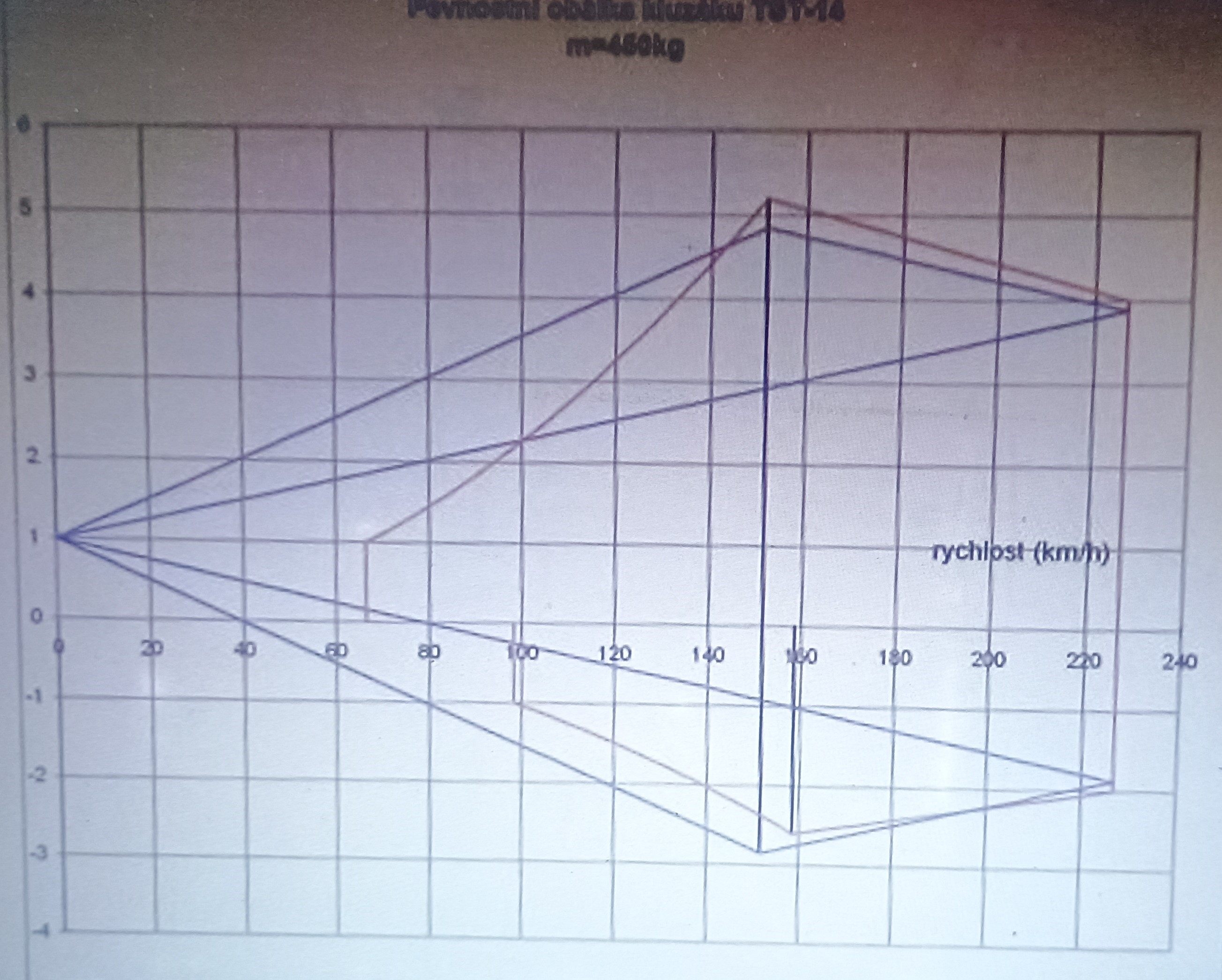
flight envelope

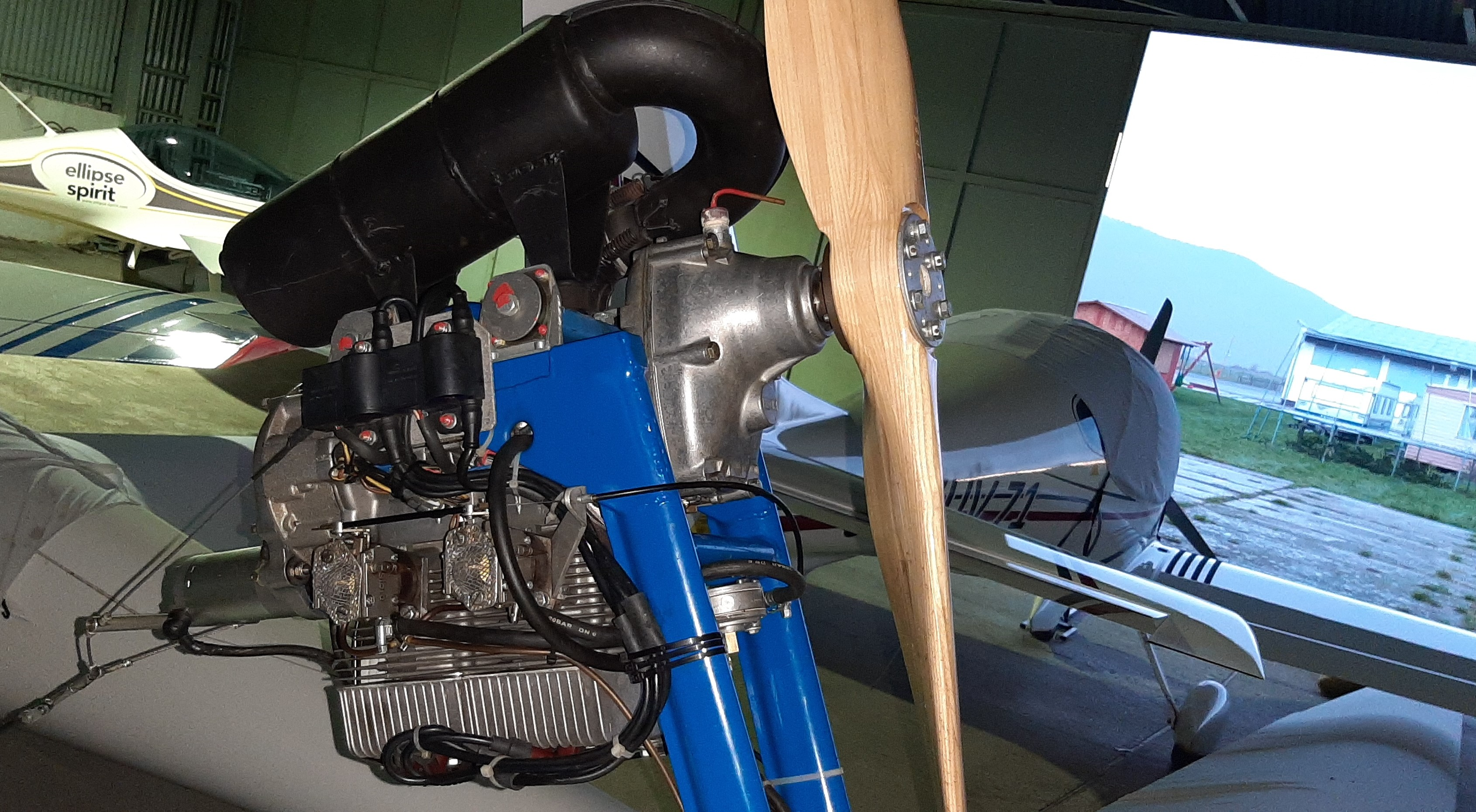
engine installation and wooden propeller

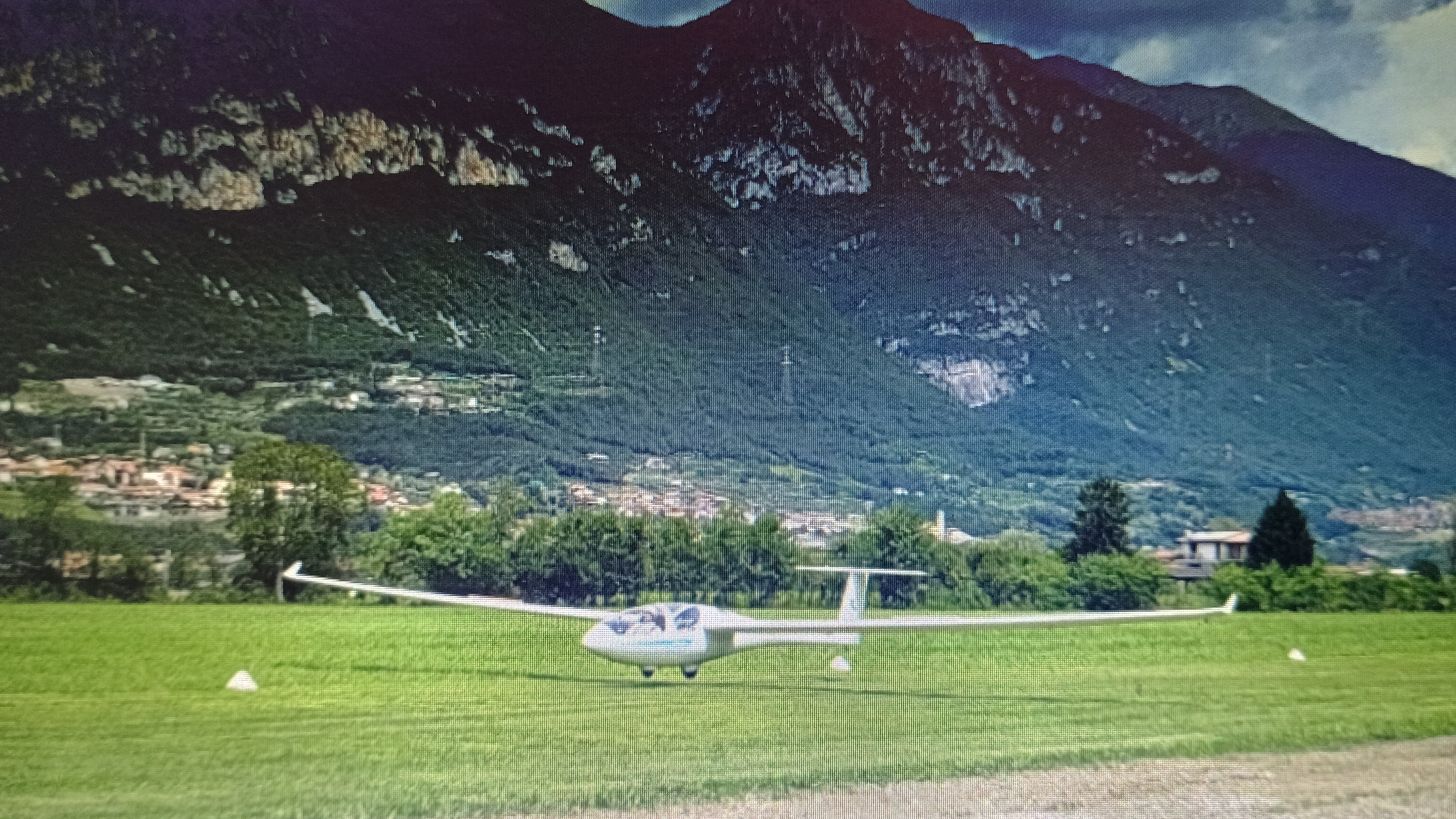
Landing on a grass runway

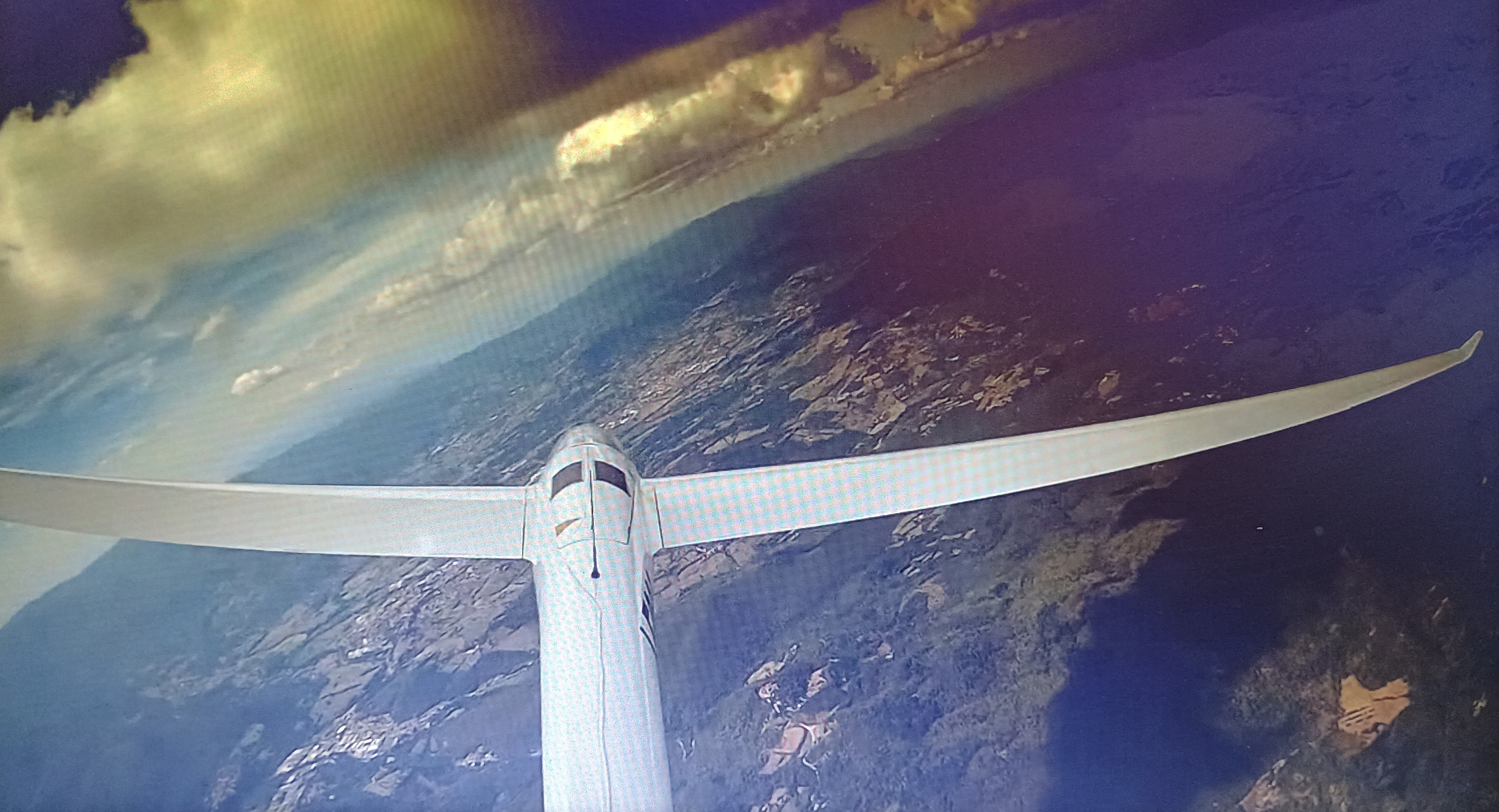
In flight

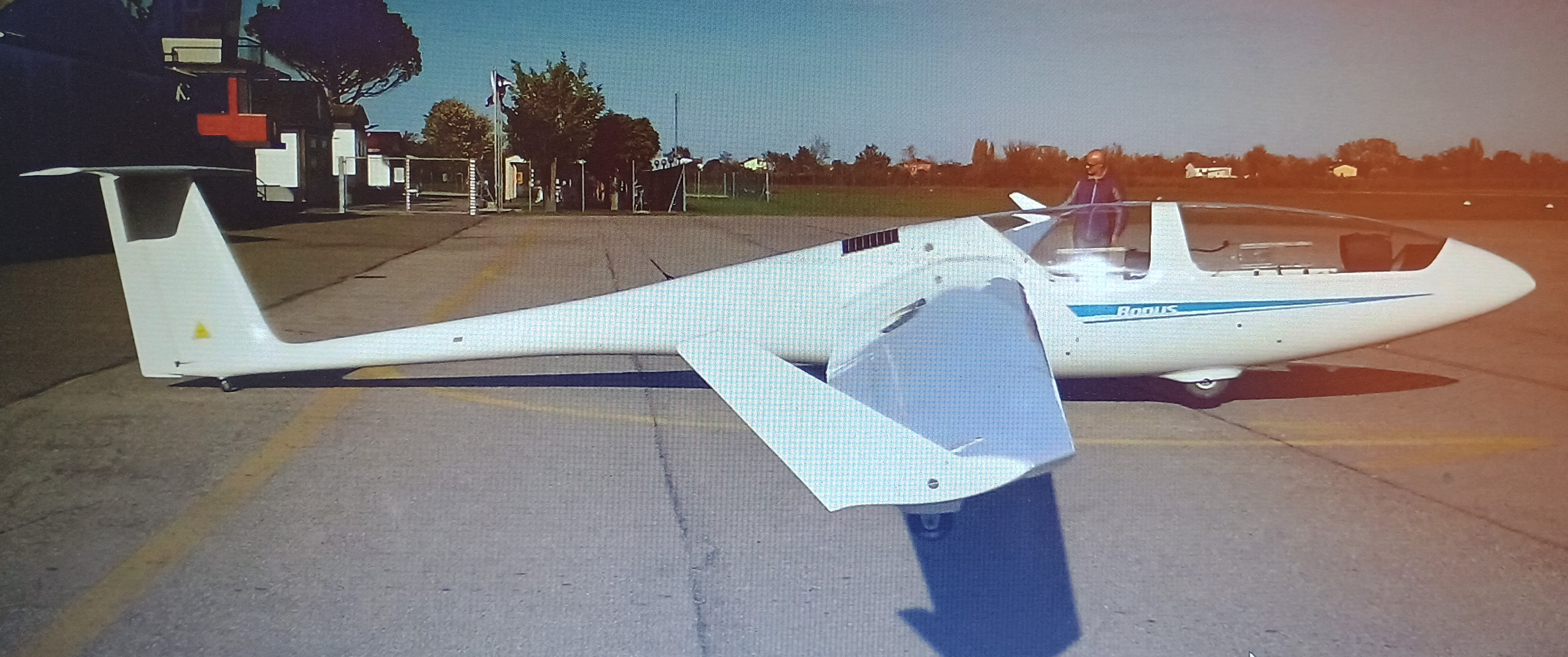
Lateral view

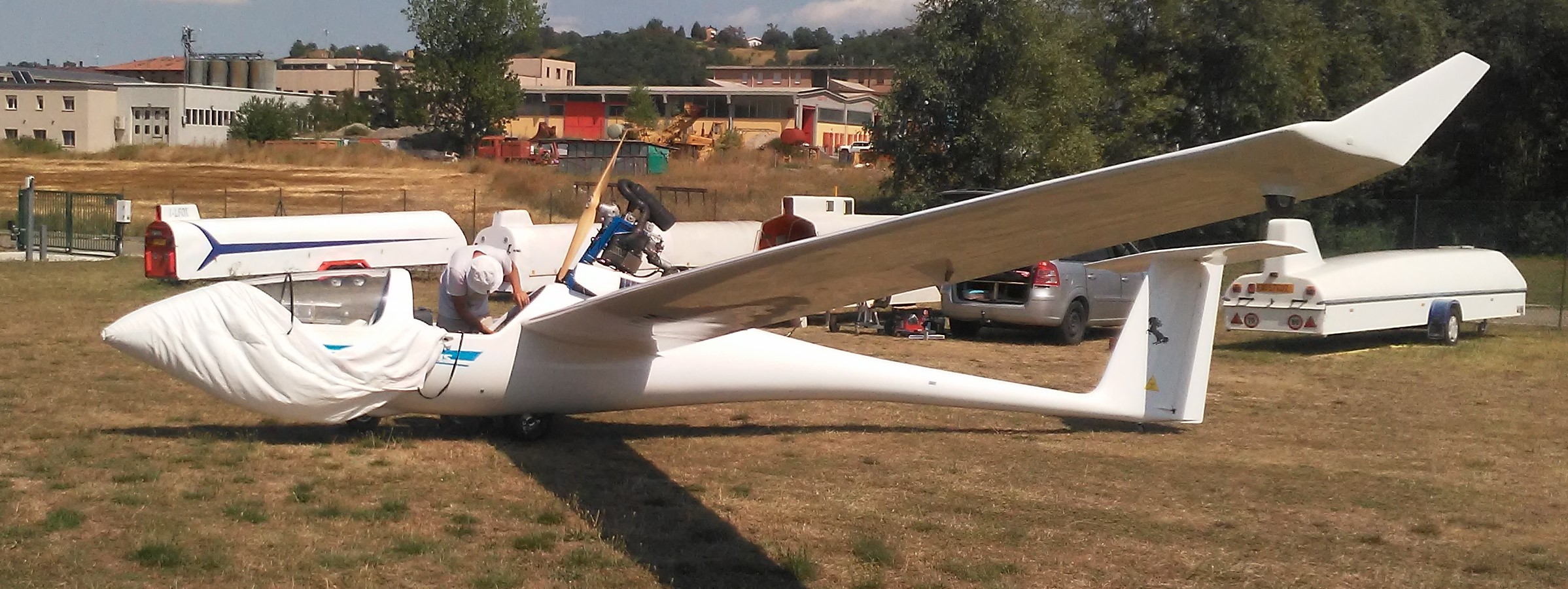
Bonus assembly

The TST-14 motor glider was designed for private owner and flying school use and as such features wing tip wheels that allow independent taxiing and take-off.

The TST-14 is constructed from composite materials, with the forward-swept wing a ribless composite sandwich structure. Each wing weighs 40 kg (88 lb) and has a single spar made with a carbon fibre composite flange plate and a polyurethane foam/fibreglass composite web plate. Glidepath control is by upper surface air brakes made from aluminium (Type "Schempp-Hirth"). The motor glider version is powered by a retractable 50 hp (37 kW) Rotax 503UL two-stroke powerlant. Extension and retraction of the engine is fully automatic, controlled with two cockpit-mounted buttons and actuated by two electric servo motors. The landing gear consists of dual fuselage-mounted tandem mainwheels and wing tip-mounted wheels.

The aircraft was type certified to the Joint Aviation Authorities JAR 22 standard for gliders on 10 Dec 2001. The TST-14 was not certified in the United States as the company explains, "due to the expense involved". The aircraft can be registered with the US Federal Aviation Administration as a Special Light Sport Aircraft glider or in the Experimental - racing/exhibition category.

== Variants ==
TST-14 Bonus
Pure glider version, with a gross weight of 472.5 kg (1,042 lb)
TST-14M
Main production motor glider version, powered by a 50 hp (37 kW) Rotax 503UL two-stroke double ignition powerlant

== Specifications (TST-14M Bonus) ==
Data from Sailplane Directory and company website

General characteristics

- Crew: one pilot - max pilot + passenger weight: 180 kg

min pilot weight 75 kg (if it is lighter, ballast must be added)
max pilot weight 100 kg (if it is heavier, ballast must be removed, if present)

- Capacity: one passenger
- Length: 8.24 m (27 ft 0 in)
- Wingspan: 17 m (55 ft 9 in)
- Height: 1.10 m (3 ft 7 in) of passenger cabin, tail Is higher
- Wing area: 12.01 m^{2} (129.3 sq ft)
- Aspect ratio: 23.92:1
- Airfoil: Wortmann modified (see also : Franz Xavier Wortmann )
- Empty weight: 280 kg (617 lb) 300 kg if present ballistic parachute
- Gross weight: 450 kg (992 lb) 472 kg if present ballistic parachute,

The ballast is positioned in the bow, in front of the pilot's feet.

- Max takeoff weight: 450 kg (992 lb) 472.5 if present a ballistic parachute
- Fuel capacity: 22.6 litres (5.0 imp gal; 6.0 US gal) approximately 2.5 hours of flight, if the engine is always on
- Powerplant: 1 × Rotax 503UL double ignition two-stroke, twin cylinder inline aero engine, 37 kW (50 hp)
- Propellers: 2-bladed wooden, 1.20 m (3 ft 11 in) diameter

Performance

- Maximum speed: 150 km/h (93 mph, 81 kn) gust or aerotow speed
- Cruise speed: 115 km/h (71 mph, 62 kn) max speed by motor = 140 km/h
- Stall speed: 65 km/h (40 mph, 35 kn)
- Never exceed speed: 205 km/h (127 mph, 111 kn)
- Range: 275 km (171 mi, 148 nmi) only if the engine is always on
- Service ceiling: 4,000 m (13,000 ft) ceiling by motor, more by sail
- g limits: +5.2/-2.6
- Maximum glide ratio: 40:1 at 115 km/h (71 mph; 62 kn)
- Rate of climb: 4.0 m/s (790 ft/min) 2.5 m/s if passenger is on
- Rate of sink: 0.65 m/s (128 ft/min) at 85 km/h (53 mph; 46 kn)
- Wing loading: 39.06 kg/m^{2} (8.00 lb/sq ft)
- Fuel consumption: 0.074 kg/km (0.26 lb/mi)

== See also ==
- List of gliders
