= TeST TST-9 Junior =

Czech motorglider

TST-9 Junior

General information
- Type: Motor glider
- National origin: Czech Republic
- Manufacturer: TeST
- Status: Production completed

History
- Developed from: TeST TST-7 Junior
- Variant: TeST TST-13 Junior

The TeST TST-9 Junior is a Czech shoulder-wing, single-seat motor glider that was designed and produced by TeST of Brno. When it was available the aircraft was supplied as plans, in kit form for amateur construction or as a complete ready-to-fly aircraft. Production is now complete and the aircraft is no longer available.

== Design and development ==
The TST-9 Junior was a development of the TST-7 Junior touring motor glider, incorporating a T-tail and other design refinements. The 12.4 m (40.7 ft) span, shoulder-mounted wing is slightly forward-swept. The wing has less span than the TST-7 Junior and consequently the aircraft has a lower glide ratio. The landing gear is of tricycle configuration, making taxiing the aircraft much easier than the monowheel gear used on the TST-1 model. The aircraft was later further refined into the TST-13 Junior.

The price for a completed ready-to-fly aircraft in 2004 was €22,240.

== Specifications (TST-9 Junior) ==
Data from World Directory of Leisure Aviation, Jane's all the World's Aircraft 2004–05

General characteristics

- Crew: one
- Length: 5.9 m (19 ft 4 in)
- Wingspan: 12.4 m (40 ft 8 in)
- Height: 2.1 m (6 ft 11 in)
- Wing area: 10 m^{2} (110 sq ft)
- Aspect ratio: 15.4
- Empty weight: 175 kg (386 lb)
- Max takeoff weight: 300 kg (661 lb)
- Fuel capacity: 25 L (6.6 US gal; 5.5 imp gal)
- Powerplant: 1 × Rotax 447 two stroke aircraft engine
- Propellers: 2-bladed SportProp 1600

Performance

- Cruise speed: 165 km/h (103 mph, 89 kn) max; 90–120 km/h (56–75 mph; 49–65 kn) economical
- Stall speed: 63 km/h (39 mph, 34 kn) in the landing configuration
- Never exceed speed: 180 km/h (110 mph, 97 kn)
- Service ceiling: 5,000 m (16,000 ft)
- g limits: +4 / -2
- Maximum glide ratio: 20:1 at 90 km/h (56 mph; 49 kn)
- Rate of climb: 4.6 m/s (900 ft/min)
- Rate of sink: 1.5 m/s (300 ft/min)

== See also ==
- List of gliders
