= TeST TST-1 Alpin =

Czech motorglider

TST-1 Alpin

General information
- Type: Motor glider
- National origin: Czech Republic
- Manufacturer: TeST
- Status: Production completed

The TeST TST-1 Alpin (English: Alpine) is a Czech shoulder-wing, single-seat, pusher configuration motor glider that was designed and produced by TeST.

== Design and development ==
The TST-1 was the first motor glider in a long line of aircraft produced by the company. The design goals included that it should be economical to build and operate as well as easy to fly, with outstanding soaring capabilities with the engine shut down.

The aircraft has a wooden structure, with some fibreglass parts. The 12.6 m (41 ft) span wing employs a Wortmann FX 61-184 airfoil. Both the wings and tail detached for transport or storage. The standard engine is a custom M-115 flat configuration two-stroke powerplant of 18 kW (24 hp), although other engines can be used instead, including the 37 kW (50 hp) Hirth F-23 and 30 kW (40 hp) Rotax 447. The engine is mounted in pusher configuration in a faired pod on a short non-retractable strut, above and behind the cockpit. The landing gear is a rigidly-mounted monowheel gear.

When it was available the aircraft was available as plans, a standard 600 hour build-time kit, an "express-built" kit or as a complete ready-to-fly aircraft. Prices in 1998 were US$325 for the plans, US$9,840 for the standard kit and US$15,250 for the completed aircraft. In 1998 22 were reportedly flying.

== Specifications (TST 1) ==
Data from Purdy

General characteristics

- Crew: one
- Length: 5.9 m (19.2 ft)
- Wingspan: 12.6 m (41 ft 4 in)
- Wing area: 11.09 m^{2} (119.4 sq ft)
- Airfoil: Wortmann FX 61-184
- Empty weight: 150 kg (330 lb)
- Gross weight: 279 kg (616 lb)
- Fuel capacity: 15 litres (3.3 imp gal; 4.0 US gal)
- Powerplant: 1 × M-115 flat two-stroke, 18 kW (24 hp)
- Propellers: two-bladed wooden, fixed pitch

Performance

- Maximum speed: 180 km/h (110 mph, 96 kn)
- Cruise speed: 97 km/h (60 mph, 52 kn)
- Stall speed: 60 km/h (37 mph, 32 kn)
- Range: 350 km (220 mi, 190 nmi)
- Service ceiling: 2,400 m (8,000 ft)

== See also ==
- List of gliders
