= Teichfuss Astore =

Astore

General information
- Type: Intermediate single-seat trainer glider
- National origin: Italy
- Manufacturer: F.A.L. Teichfuss (Fabrica Alianti Teichfuss), la Aie, Pavulla
- Designer: Luigi Teichfluss
- Number built: 2

History
- First flight: 1936

The Teichfuss Astore (English: Goshawk) was an Italian Intermediate single-seat trainer glider designed by Luigi Teichfuss and flown in 1936. Two were built.

== Design and development ==
The 1936 Astore was very similar to the RRG Falke designed by Alexander Lippisch in 1930. Like the Falke it was intended as a secondary or intermediate trainer, its swept wing bringing intrinsic stability and safety for the inexperienced pilot. The Astore was a little larger than the Falke, 11% in span and 19% in length.

The Astore was a braced high-wing monoplane, its constant chord wing swept at about 10°. The wing was a single spar structure with plywood covering from the spar forward around the leading edge forming a torsion-resistant D-box. Aft of the spar the wing was fabric covered. Ailerons were hinged at right angles to the fuselage and were lobate, with curved edges that blended into rounded wing tips. The wing, which was mounted with dihedral, was supported over the fuselage by a pair of inverted V-struts from the upper longerons and a small pillar behind the cockpit. A longer faired bracing V-strut joined the lower longeron to the wing at about one third span on each side.

The fuselage was a ply covered wooden hexagonal structure with deep sides and an open cockpit under the wing. A straight tapered tailplane was positioned forward of a small fin, carrying elevators which had a cut-out between them for operation of the straight tapered balanced rudder. The rudder extended to the keel, protected by a small tail bumper under the fin. The undercarriage was a standard, long skid equipped with rubber shock absorbers; wheels on a short axle attached to the lower fuselage provided an alternative, narrow track, undercarriage.

The Astore first flew in 1936. Two were built and used by the Pavullo nel Frignano flying school.

== Specifications ==
Data from Perielli (2011) p.47

General characteristics

- Crew: One
- Length: 6.25 m (20 ft 6 in)
- Wingspan: 14 m (45 ft 11 in)
- Height: 1.58 m (5 ft 2 in)
- Wing area: 18 m^{2} (190 sq ft)
- Aspect ratio: 11
- Airfoil: Göttingen 535 root, outboard via reflex to symmetrical
- Empty weight: 177 kg (390 lb)
- Gross weight: 252 kg (556 lb)

Performance

- Maximum speed: 120 km/h (75 mph, 65 kn)
- Maximum glide ratio: 18:1 at 60 km/h (37 mph)
- Rate of sink: 0.85 m/s (167 ft/min) minimum
- Wing loading: 13.8 kg/m^{2} (2.8 lb/sq ft)

== See also ==
Related lists

- List of gliders
