= Tarczyński and Stępniewki TS-1/34 Promyk =

TS-1/34 Promyk
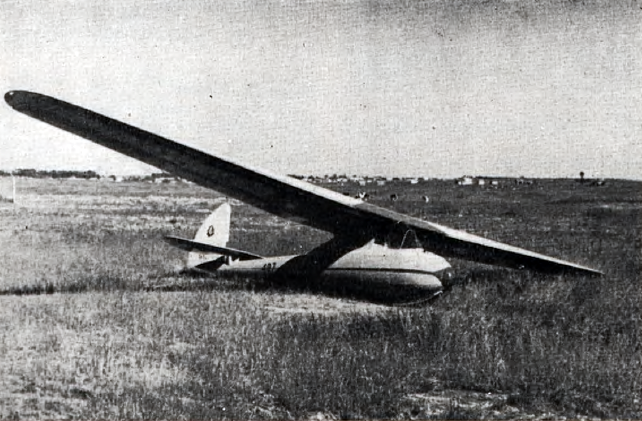

General information
- Type: Experimental high performance sailplane
- National origin: Poland
- Manufacturer: ZASPL
- Designer: Tadeusz Tarczyński and Wiesław Stępniewki
- Number built: 1

History
- First flight: Spring 1937

The Tarczyński and Stępniewki TS-1/34 Promyk was a Polish short span, high performance sailplane from the mid-1930s and was the first Polish sailplane equipped with flaps. Its construction was delayed by a financial crisis and its development terminated by World War II.

== Design and development ==
In the mid-1930s there was international interest in short span but high performance sailplanes, because their ability to turn tightly would enable them to remain within narrow thermals. The German Darmstadt D-28 Windspiel, built in 1933, was an early example. The structure of the later, experimental Promyk (Small Radius) was almost twice as heavy as that of the delicate Windspiel, though the span was slightly less. Otherwise known as the TS-1/34, its design was started in 1934 but construction in the ZASPL workshops in Lwów was delayed by a financial crisis in Poland between 1935 and 1936 which led to a government clampdown on prototype building. The delay gave Stępniewki the opportunity to make the Promyk the first Polish sailplane with flaps. It finally flew in the spring of 1937.

The single-seat Promyk was an all-wood aircraft with a cantilever, one piece wing which was trapezoidal in plan out to rounded tips. Sources differ somewhat on its construction: Cynk describes it as a two spar structure, samolotypolskie as having a single spar, assisted by an angled auxiliary strut. It was covered by a mixture of plywood and fabric. The camber-changing split flaps, inboard of the ailerons, had a maximum deflection of 40° and could act as airbrakes as well as increasing low speed lift.

The wing was mounted over an oval-section, ply-covered semi-monocoque fuselage on a short faired pylon, ahead of which was an enclosed cockpit. A sprung landing skid ran under the forward fuselage; aft, the fuselage became slender before ending at an integral, ply-covered fin which carried a rounded, fabric-covered, balanced rudder. The Promyk had a one-piece, ply- and fabric-covered horizontal tail strut-mounted over the fuselage in front of the fin.

== Operational history ==
The Promyk was test flown at Lwów over the summer of 1937 by Zbigniew Żabski, after which it went to Warsaw for ITL airworthiness trials. Its general handling was praised and its ability to soar in low lift conditions highlighted. From the autumn of 1937 it was engaged in manoeuvrability research in an ITL-supported programme designed by Oleński and flown by him and Ciastula.

After this ended in 1939 the Promyk went to Bezmiechowa Górna, where it made some cross-country flights. Further development was prevented by the outbreak of World War II.

== Specifications ==
Data from J.Cynk (1971) except where noted.

General characteristics

- Crew: One
- Length: 6.35 m (20 ft 10 in)
- Wingspan: 11.8 m (38 ft 9 in)
- Height: 1.5 m (4 ft 11 in)
- Wing area: 13.6 m^{2} (146 sq ft)
- Aspect ratio: 10.3
- Empty weight: 105 kg (231 lb)
- Gross weight: 195 kg (430 lb)

Performance

- Maximum glide ratio: 22.5 at 60 km/h (37 mph; 32 kn) best
- Rate of sink: 0.79 m/s (156 ft/min) minimum, at 55 km/h (34 mph; 30 kn)
- Minimum speed: 42 km/h (26 mph; 23 kn)
