= Teichfuss Falco =

Falco

General information
- Type: Single seat intermediate performance glider
- National origin: Italy
- Designer: Luigi Teichfuss
- Number built: 2

History
- First flight: 1931

The Teichfuss Falco (English: Falcon) was an Italian single-seat, intermediate-performance glider, designed by Luigi Teichfuss and flown in 1931.

== Design and development ==
The Falco was designed as a glider with performance better than that of a trainer though not at a soaring competition level. It was a high-wing monoplane, with its single spar wing braced on each side by a pair of faired struts arranged in a V, joining the lower fuselage to the outer end of the central panel at about one-third span. This central panel was rectangular in plan and without dihedral. The outer panels were straight-tapered to blunt tips, the wing becoming thinner and thus acquiring dihedral though retaining a horizontal upper surface. Ailerons occupied the whole trailing edges of these outer panels; there were no inboard flaps or air brakes.

Its wood-framed, plywood-skinned fuselage was deep-sided and hexagonal in cross section, tapering markedly towards the tail. The wing was mounted on a pedestal which continued only briefly behind the wing. The pilot's open cockpit was immediately ahead of the pedestal and below the wing leading edge. There was no fixed tailplane; instead the Falco had a single-piece, all-moving elevator with a straight leading edge and a semi-elliptical trailing edge. There was a small triangular fin which supported a much larger, tall balanced rudder, essentially triangular in shape but with rounded vertices. Hinged above the elevator trailing edge, which had a cut-out for its movement, the rudder extended down to the keel, where it was protected by a small, faired tail bumper. There was a long landing skid with rubber shock absorbers, running from near the nose to under the aft end of the wing pedestal.

The Falco first flew in 1931. Two were built; one was lost in a crash.

== Specifications ==
Data from Pedrielli (2011) pp.36-7

General characteristics

- Capacity: One
- Length: 7.06 m (23 ft 2 in)
- Wingspan: 16 m (52 ft 6 in)
- Height: 1.44 m (4 ft 9 in)
- Wing area: 18.60 m^{2} (200.2 sq ft)
- Aspect ratio: 14
- Empty weight: 155 kg (342 lb)
- Gross weight: 240 kg (529 lb)

Performance

- Maximum glide ratio: estimated 21.5:1
- Rate of sink: 0.65 m/s (128 ft/min) minimum
- Wing loading: 12.9 kg/m^{2} (2.6 lb/sq ft)

== See also ==
Related lists

- List of gliders
