= Teichfuss Nibio =

Italian glider

Nibio

General information
- Type: Single-seat glider
- National origin: Italy
- Manufacturer: Luigi Teichfuss
- Designer: Luigi Teichfuss

History
- First flight: 1929

The Teichfuss Nibio (the German-speaking Teichfuss's spelling of the Italian Nibbio or English: Kite) was an Italian single seat glider, designed by Luigi Teichfuss and flown in two versions around 1930.

== Design and development ==
The original Nibio, the Nibio I was designed as a primary glider and was built in the Royal Aircraft factory at Pavullo nel Frignano Airport during 1929. Apart from its span of 12.5 m (41 ft 0 in), empty weight of 145 kg (320 lb) and all-up weight of 220 kg (485 lb) very little information on it exists. Some launches were made by aerotow, behind an Aviatik from Taliedo. The Nibio II, sometimes known as the Nibio II Freccia Nera (English: Black Arrow) followed the next year with a new wing. Its greater span, increased by 900 mm (35 in), provided an increase in aspect ratio. Despite its longer wing the Nibio II was 20 kg (44 lb) lighter.

The Nibio II was a high-wing monoplane with its wing braced by a single faired strut on each side, joining the lower fuselage to the outer end of the central panel at about one third span. This central panel was rectangular in plan and was without dihedral. The outer panels were straight tapered to blunt tips, the wing becoming thinner and thus acquiring dihedral though retaining a horizontal upper surface. Ailerons occupied the whole trailing edges of these outer panels; there were no inboard flaps or air brakes.

Its wood framed, plywood skinned fuselage was hexagonal in cross section, tapering markedly on its underside towards the tail. The wing was mounted on a pedestal which sloped away aft into the upper fuselage. The pilot's cockpit, open behind a small windscreen, was immediately ahead of the pedestal and below the wing leading edge. The tail surfaces were straight tapered and straight tipped, with the tailplane mounted on the fuselage. The rudder extended down to the keel, operating within a small cut-out between the elevators and protected from the ground by a small underfin which served as a tail bumper. There was a short landing skid running from near the nose to just aft of the wing strut.

== Variants ==
Nibio I
Training glider, flown 1929. One only.
Nibio II Freccia Nera
(also written as Nibio 2 ),(Freccia Nera - Black Arrow), Higher performance version with greater span and aspect ratio, flown 1930. One only.

== Specifications (Nibio II Freccia Nera) ==
Data from Pedrielli (2011) pp.32-3

General characteristics

- Capacity: One
- Length: 6.20 m (20 ft 4 in)
- Wingspan: 13.40 m (44 ft 0 in)
- Height: 1.3 m (4 ft 3 in)
- Wing area: 12.60 m^{2} (135.6 sq ft)
- Aspect ratio: 14.2
- Airfoil: Göttingen 535 and NACA M6
- Empty weight: 125 kg (276 lb)
- Gross weight: 210 kg (463 lb)

Performance

- Maximum glide ratio: estimated 19:1
- Rate of sink: 0.8 m/s (160 ft/min) minimum
- Wing loading: 16.7 kg/m^{2} (3.4 lb/sq ft)

== See also ==
Related lists

- List of gliders
