= Intercontinental Manufacturing Company =

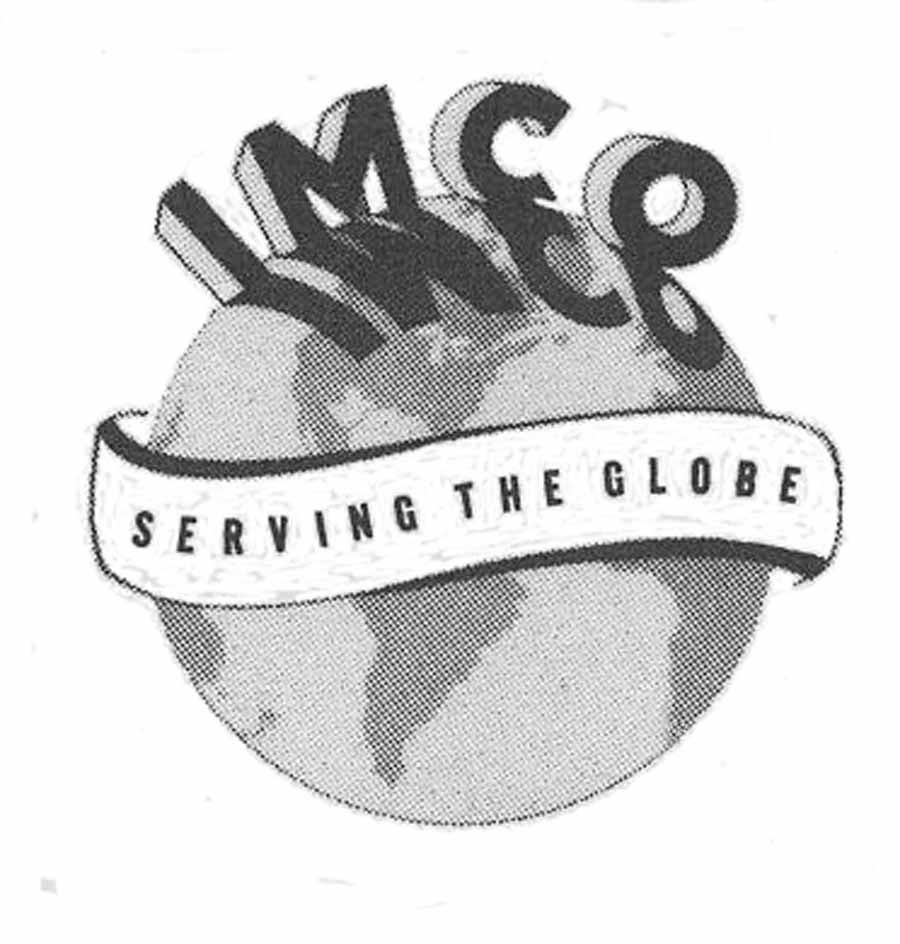
Intercontinental Manufacturing Company (IMCO) Logo

The Intercontinental Manufacturing Company (IMCO) was formed in the Dallas, Texas area in 1948 by Harold J. Silver and Robert F. Yonash, initially to fulfill an order from Argentina for tractors. IMCO soon changed focus to defense subcontracting, where it remains today.

== Company startup ==
=== Intercontinental C-26 tractor ===
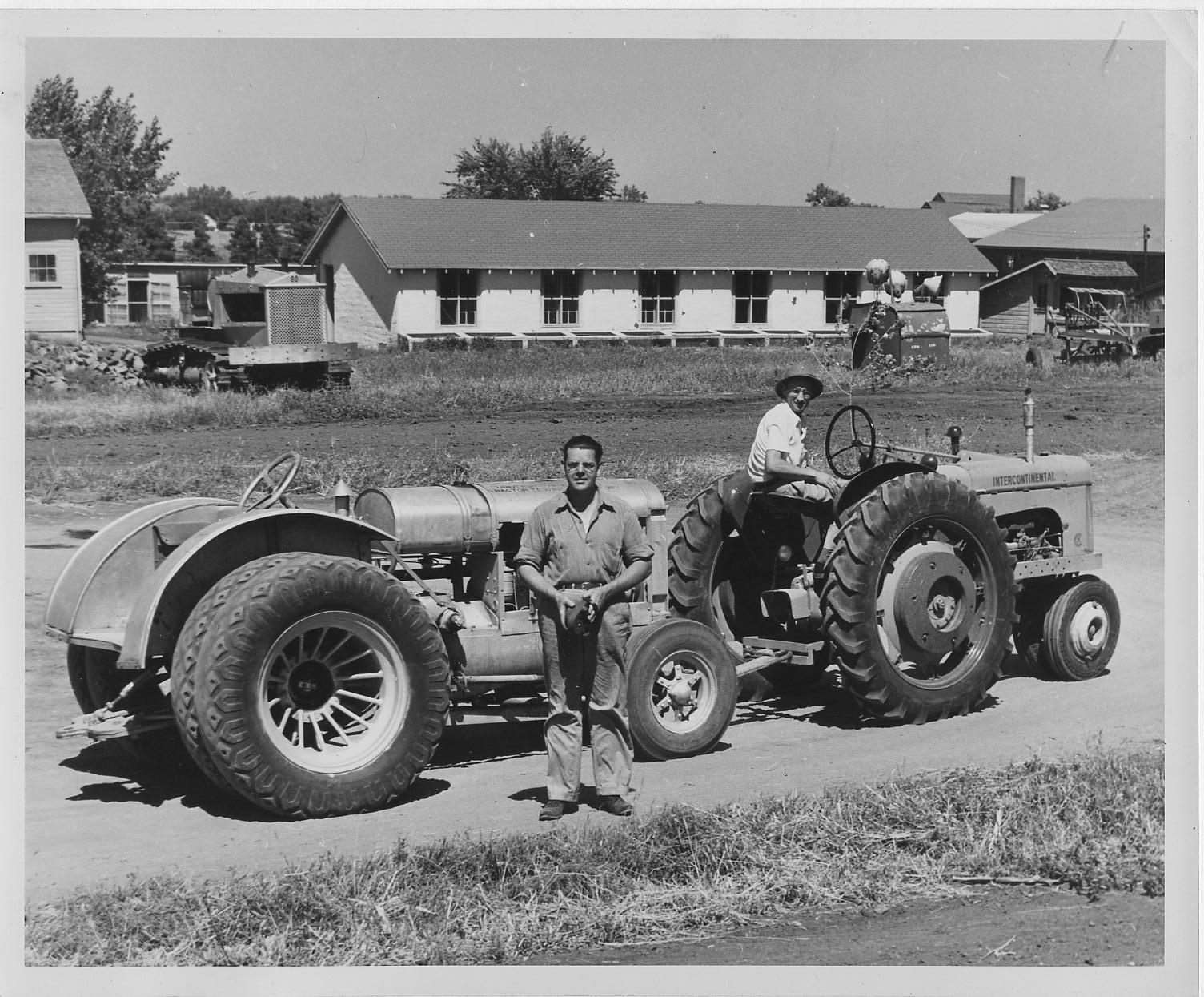
Intercontinental Manufacturing Company C26 Tractor

In 1948, Harold J. Silver, a New York business man with connections in Argentina, had obtained a firm order for 3000 tractors there and had a letter of credit guaranteeing payment as soon as they were delivered dockside. The tractors were to be made of components from various sources, including Nateco (National Equipment Company of Texas) tractor base, a Continental Motors Company engine, and a Timken Company transaxle assembly. The bad news was that it was now May, and the contract required delivery by January 1, 1949. Any delay and the sales would probably be lost to established manufacturers.

Silver went in search of a supplier. The Republic National Bank of Dallas referred him to Robert F. Yonash, who had listed himself as a business consultant with the bank. Silver hired Yonash to attend a meeting of the project participants to get things organized. The meeting was in a hotel. When Bob got to the room, the meeting participants were yelling at each other so loudly that they couldn't hear him knocking on the door. Finally, he got in and got things calmed down. When he started asking questions, he found out that there was a mixture of languages in the room, and no one person had enough languages to talk to the entire room. Several people had two or more, so they had to translate for the others.

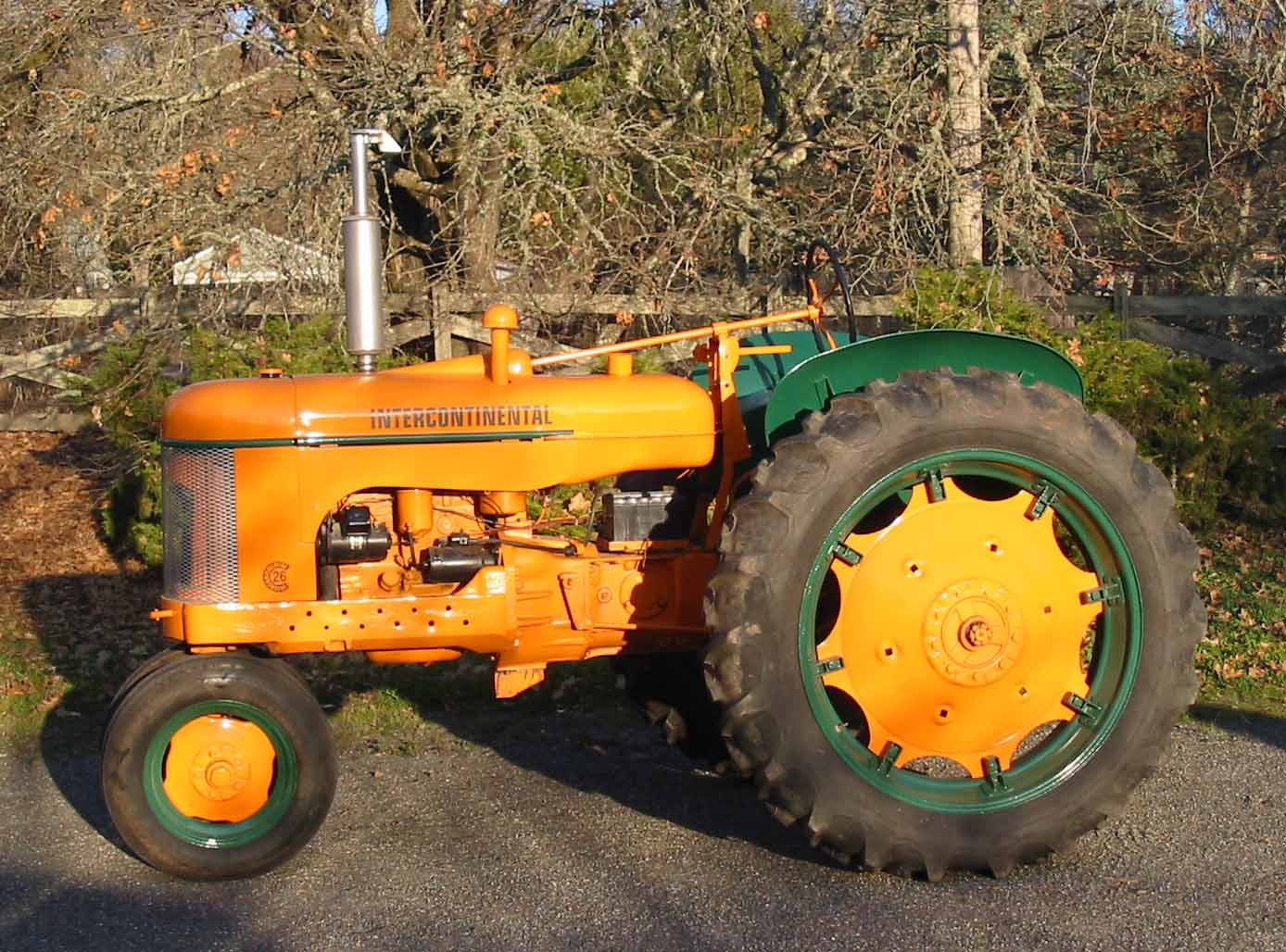
IMCO Gasolene Tractor

This meeting eventually led to the tractor that was the foundation for the Intercontinental Manufacturing Company (IMCO).

Bob thought it ought to be worth a fat fee to pull this deal out of the fire and turn out a finished product with fairly high volume in seven months. The Intercontinental Manufacturing Company, which at that point existed only in a briefcase, didn't disagree, but their doubts that it could be done were apparent when they scaled back Bob' s salary request and offered him $5 for each tractor delivered on time instead.

Bob managed to get commitments from the suppliers, and then arranged with the Texas Engineering & Manufacturing Company (TEMCO) to do the assembly at its Garland, Texas facility. By October production was flowing smoothly, another 1500 tractors had been sold to Brazil, and the Intercontinental Manufacturing Company was off and running with Silver as president and Yonash as V.P. of production.

=== Intercontinental diesel tractor ===
IMCO also produced a diesel version of the tractor, powered by a Buda Engine Co. engine. This was Models D-E and D-F.

== Switch to defense production of aircraft components ==
By 1951, IMCO had switched its emphasis to approximately ninety percent defense production of aircraft components. Aircraft components produced in IMCO's early days included:

- B-36 trailing edges
- P5M-1 wings
- B-47 tank support
- F4U aft section
- Bell Helicopter center frame

=== Acquisition of the Southern Aircraft plant in Garland ===
Initially, IMCO's offices were in space subleased from TEMCO in the old North American Aviation plant in Dallas, where its tractors were being assembled. In March 1949, IMCO leased the Garland, Texas facility of the Southern Aircraft Corporation (SAC), which had gone bankrupt earlier that year. In the process, IMCO also acquired SAC's inventory. When the facility became available for purchase the next year from the War Assets Administration and the Public Buildings Agency, IMCO bought it. In addition to moving its tractor assembly from TEMCO and opening a second line, IMCO produced several products at the Garland facility:

- Aircraft parts, including engine mounts for the B-36 bomber on a subcontract with Consolidated-Vultee
- Bus bodies for Cuba and Greece under the Marshall Plan
- Farm implements for Brazil and other countries

=== Brady Aviation Corporation ===
In October 1951, IMCO started a subsidiary, Brady Aviation Corporation (BAA), at the Curtis Airfield in Brady, Texas. The terms of the lease were $1 a year for 20 years on the condition that BAA provide a minimum of 500 jobs within six months. By the time of its first anniversary, BAA had 1300 employees with a payroll of $3,500,000 per year and was still growing. This success was due in part to contracts with the Glenn L. Martin Company and Boeing.

== IMCO Timeline ==
- 1948 Formed in Garland, Texas: producing tractors, farm implements, busses, and motor coaches
- 1949 Purchased the former Southern Aircraft facility in Garland, Texas
- 1951 Business now 90% defense production of aircraft components
- 1951 Brady Aviation Corporation subsidiary formed
- 1955 IMCO sold to unknown buyer(s)
- 1964 American Hydrocarbon acquired IMCO from Lionel Corporation
- 1967 Intercontinental Industries holding company formed in Florida primarily to operate IMCO
- 1968 Acquired by International Controls Corporation, owner of Datron Systems
- 1988 ICC sold subsidiary Datron Systems to the new company Datron, Inc.
- 2003 General Dynamics acquired IMCO from Datron, Inc.
