= Temco Model 33 Plebe =

1953 prototype American two-seat training aircraft

Model 33 Plebe

General information
- Type: Military trainer
- National origin: United States
- Manufacturer: Temco Aircraft
- Number built: 1

History
- First flight: 1953
- Developed from: Temco Buckaroo
- Developed into: Temco 58

The Temco Model 33 Plebe was an American two-seat training aircraft built by Temco Aircraft and evaluated by the United States Navy, only a prototype was built.

== Design and development ==
Developed from the earlier Temco Buckaroo, the Plebe was a single-engined low-wing monoplane with a retractable tricycle landing gear. The Plebe was powered by a 225 hp (168 kW) Continental O-470-3 piston engine with a two-bladed tractor propeller. The two crew sat in tandem with dual controls under a sliding canopy.

First flown in 1953 the Plebe was evaluated by the United States Navy to meet the requirement for a primary/basic trainer. A contract was placed for the competing Beechcraft Mentor and only the prototype Plebe was built.

== Specifications ==
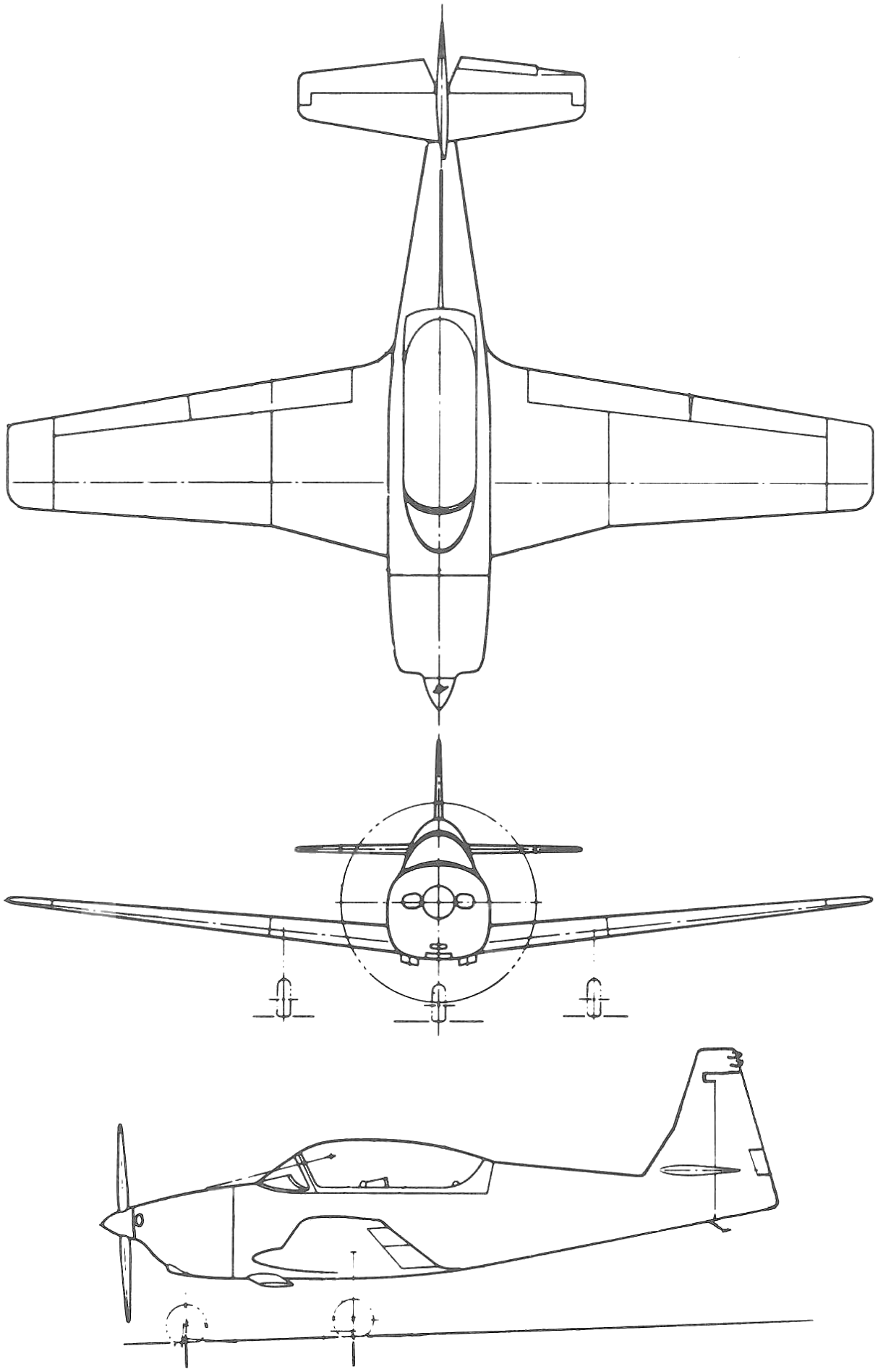
3-view line drawing of the Temco Model 33 Plebe

Data from

General characteristics

- Crew: 2
- Length: 31 ft 3 in (9.52 m)
- Wingspan: 24 ft 1 in (7.33 m)
- Height: 9 ft 2 in (3.00 m)
- Empty weight: 1,800 lb (816 kg)
- Gross weight: 2,500 lb (1,134 kg)
- Powerplant: 1 × Continental O-470-13 , 225 hp (168 kW)

Performance

- Maximum speed: 192 mph (308 km/h, 167 kn)
- Range: 518 mi (834 km, 450 nmi)

== See also ==
Aircraft of comparable role, configuration, and era

- Beechcraft T-34 Mentor
- Ryan Navion Model 72
