= Temco TT Pinto =

1956 primary jet trainer aircraft family

TT Pinto
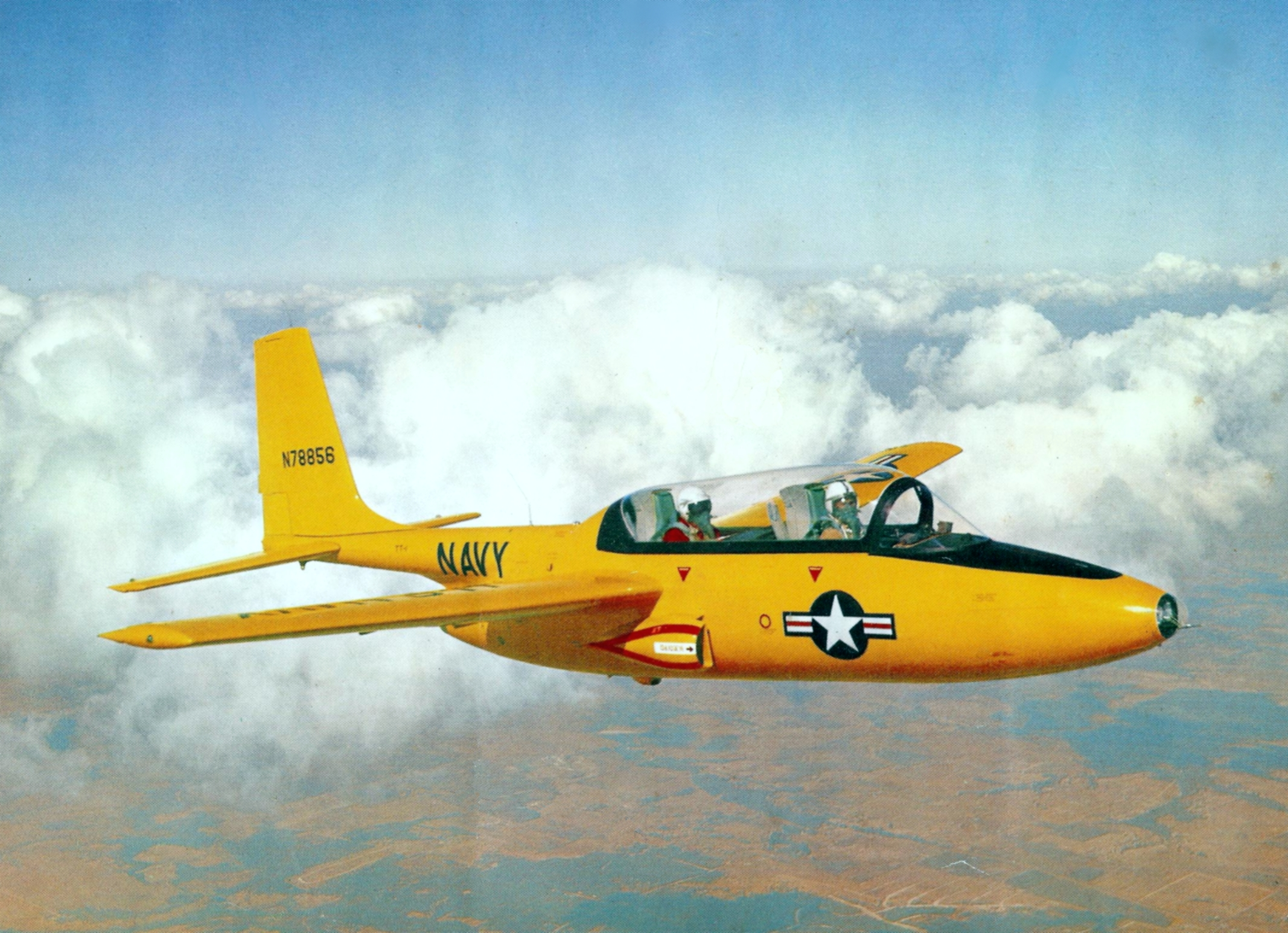
- Temco TT-1 in testing

General information
- Type: Jet Trainer
- Manufacturer: Temco Aircraft
- Primary user: United States Navy
- Number built: 15

History
- Introduction date: 1959
- First flight: 26 March 1956
- Retired: 1960
- Variant: AJI T-610 Super Pinto

The Temco TT Pinto is a tandem two-seat primary jet trainer built for the United States Navy by Temco Aircraft of Dallas, Texas.

== Design and development ==
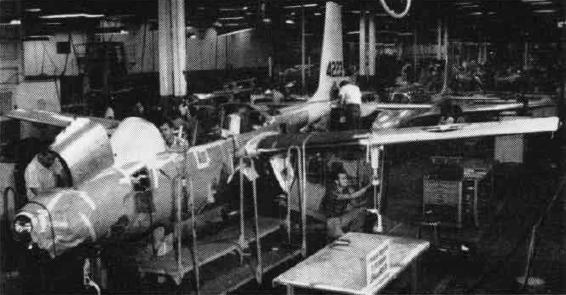
TT-1s being assembled in Dallas (1957)

The Temco Model 51 had been initially proposed to the US Air Force in response to an Air Force competition for a jet-powered primary trainer, which was won by the Cessna T-37 Tweet. The concept behind the Model 51 was an attempt to provide primary training in a jet-powered aircraft. The official name for the Model 51 was the Pinto.

The Pinto was a mid-wing, tricycle landing gear trainer with an enclosed cockpit powered by a single Continental Motors J69-T-9 (license-built Turbomeca Marboré) jet engine (920 pounds thrust). The aircraft carried no armament.

The TT-1s were equipped with many of the same features found in operational jets, including ejection seats, liquid oxygen equipment, speed brakes, along with typical flight controls and instrument panels. Although the flight characteristics were considered good, the "wave off" capability was rated marginal due to being slightly underpowered.

After its first flight in 1956, the prototype was sent to the Naval Air Test Center (NATC) Patuxent River to be evaluated alongside the Beech Model 73 Jet Mentor. Fourteen of the aircraft, designated TT-1, were produced between 1955 and 1957. The plane was used in an initial experiment to try using a jet aircraft as the Navy's introductory primary trainer. Its endurance, though, was only about one hour -- insufficient for the training mission. The TT-1's performance was deemed inadequate, and after about a year, the program was canceled.

=== AJI T-610 Super Pinto ===
In 1968, American Jet Industries (AJI) (later to become Gulfstream Aerospace) re-engined a TT-1 Pinto. The J69 was replaced with a 2,850 lbf (12.7 kN) General Electric CJ610 (the civil version of the J85). The modified aircraft, called the T-610 Super Pinto, flew on 28 June 1968. The new engine significantly increased performance, with maximum speed reaching 450 kn (518 mph; 833 km/h), and AJI marketed the aircraft as a light attack aircraft.

The prototype Super Pinto, together with drawings and production rights, was purchased by the Philippine Air Force, which planned to build the aircraft as the T-610 Cali. An incomplete second prototype was shipped to the Philippines, where it was completed and flown. The collapse of the Marcos administration resulted in the shelving of the project.

In 1988, a joint venture was announced for a new version of the Super Pinto, called T-100 Super Mustang, to be built by a collaboration between the American Avstar, Inc. and the Chinese Shenyang Aircraft Corporation. A prototype powered by a General Electric J85 turbojet was reportedly flight-tested in the United States; however, nothing further came of this project.

== Operational history ==
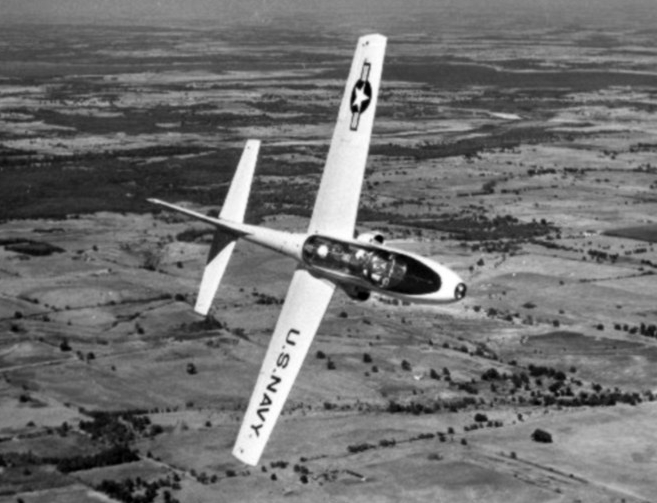
A U.S. Navy TT-1 in flight (1958)

In 1959, these aircraft served in the Air Training Command at Pensacola, Florida and were used in a training program demonstration testing the feasibility of using a jet-powered trainer for primary flight training.

By the end of 1960, the TT-1s were phased out of operations in the Naval Air Training Command because performance was deemed insufficient, and sold as surplus.

== Variants ==
TT-1 Pinto
Two-seat primary jet trainer aircraft.
American Jet Industries T-610 Super Pinto
Re-engined with 2,850 lbf (12.7 kN) General Electric CJ610-6 turbojet.
McDonnell Model 182
Proposed modification of a TT-1 for use as a testbed for McDonnell Aircraft Corporation's "spin jet" propulsion system. Proposed in 1961.
McDonnell Model 183
Proposed modification of a TT-1 for use as a testbed for a VTOL installation of the "spin jet" propulsion system. Proposed alongside the Model 182 in 1961, the Model 183 would have used a redesigned wing.

== Operators ==
United States

- United States Navy

== Surviving aircraft ==
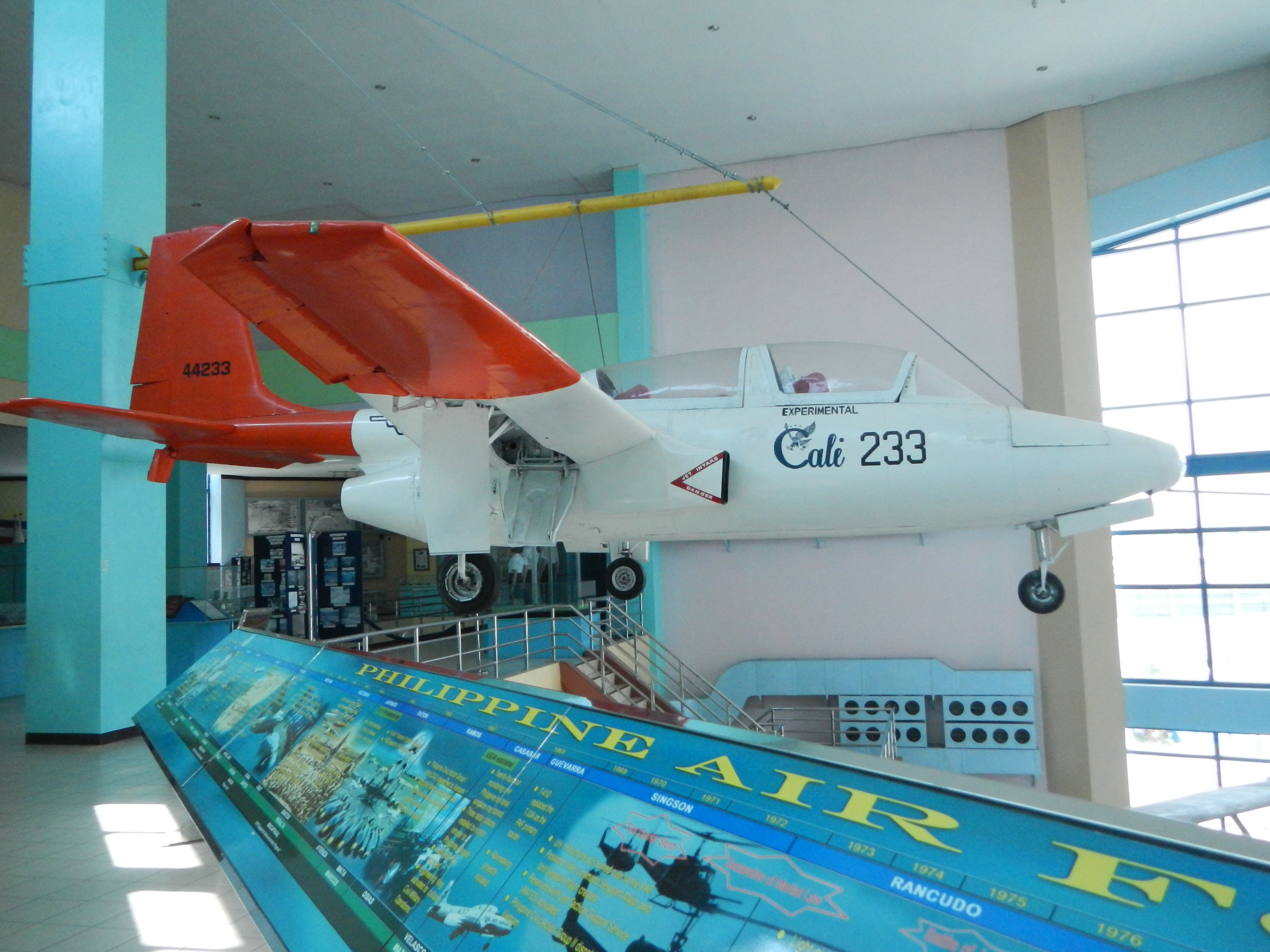
T-610 prototype, Philippine Air Force Museum

In December 2016, five of the TT-1 Pinto series still appeared on the U.S. civil register (one with an expired certificate), down from seven, four of them Super Pintos, in 2011.

As of late 2015, one T-610 prototype was still preserved at the Philippine Air Force Museum.

== Specifications (TT-1) ==
Data from Jane's All The World's Aircraft 1956–57

General characteristics

- Crew: 2
- Length: 30 ft 7 in (9.32 m)
- Wingspan: 29 ft 10 in (9.09 m)
- Height: 10 ft 10 in (3.30 m)
- Wing area: 150 sq ft (14 m^{2})
- Gross weight: 4,440 lb (2,014 kg)
- Fuel capacity: 119 US gal (99 imp gal; 450 L) normal; 165 US gal (137 imp gal; 620 L) max
- Powerplant: 1 × Continental YJ69-T-9 centrifugal flow compressor turbojet engine, 920 lbf (4.1 kN) thrust

Performance

- Maximum speed: 345 mph (555 km/h, 300 kn) at 15,000 ft (4,600 m); 328 mph (285 kn; 528 km/h) at sea level
- Cruise speed: 247 mph (398 km/h, 215 kn) at 25,000 ft (7,600 m)
- Stall speed: 76 mph (122 km/h, 66 kn) at take-off weight: 69 mph (60 kn; 111 km/h) at landing weight
- Never exceed speed: 518 mph (834 km/h, 450 kn)
- Endurance: 1.5 hours
- Service ceiling: 30,000 ft (9,100 m)
- Rate of climb: 1,900 ft/min (9.7 m/s)

== See also ==
Related development

- AJI T-610 Super Pinto

Aircraft of comparable role, configuration, and era

- BAC Jet Provost
- Beech Model 73 Jet Mentor
- Cessna T-37
- PZL TS-11 Iskra
- Yakovlev Yak-30 Magnum

== Bibliography ==
- Dillon, Mike. "Will lovely loser become super winner?" Air Progress, Vol. 24, no. 3, March 1969.
- Field, Hugh (16 October 1976). "Launch Pad for Hustler". Flight International. pp. 1184–1185. Archived from the original on 24 December 2013.
- Frankel, Mark. Temco TT-1 Pinto (Naval Fighters Nº72). Simi Valley, California: Ginter Books, 2007. ISBN 0-942612-72-8.
- "Military Aircraft of the World". Flight International. 1 March 1980. pp. 641–694. Archived from the original on 24 December 2013.
- Taylor, John W. R. Jane's All The World's Aircraft 1971–72. London: Sampson Low, Marston & Co. Ltd, 1971. ISBN 0-354-00094-2.
- Taylor, Michael J.H. Jane's Encyclopedia of Aviation (Vol. 5). Danbury, Connecticut: Grolier Educational Corporation, 1980. ISBN 0-7106-0710-5.
