= Temco XKDT Teal =

XKDT Teal
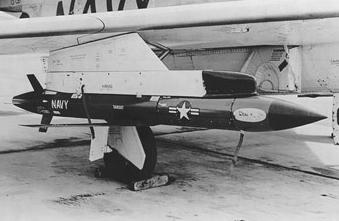
- XKDT-1 on F3H launch aircraft

General information
- Type: Target drone
- National origin: United States
- Manufacturer: Temco Aircraft
- Primary user: United States Navy

History
- First flight: September 1957

The Temco XKDT Teal was an American rocket-propelled, high-performance target drone, built by Temco Aircraft for evaluation by the United States Navy in the late 1950s. Production was not proceeded with following evaluation of the type.

== Design and development ==
The XKDT was designed for use an inexpensive and expendable air-launched, high-performance target drone. Its design utilized a low-set swept wing, and an inverted cruciform tail; the structure of the aircraft included aluminum honeycomb wing construction and extensive use of magnesium and fiberglass in the fuselage. It was intended to reach speeds of up to Mach 0.95.

The Teal could be launched at any altitude of up to 50,000 feet (15,000 m); speed at launch was between 163 knots (302 km/h; 188 mph) and 248 knots (459 km/h; 285 mph). Following launch a dual-thrust solid fuel rocket motor ignited; thrust was 150 lbf (670 N) for the first four seconds of powered flight, followed by 50 lbf (220 N) for approximately 500 seconds propulsive time. Control was provided by a three-axis autopilot; radar reflectors and infrared flares provided an assist in tracking the drone, and at the end of nine minutes' flight time a self-destruct device would be activated.

== Operational history ==
The first flight of a XKDT-1 took place in September 1957; most flights utilized a McDonnell F3H Demon carrier aircraft. Following the conclusion of the evaluation program, no production contract was placed; supersonic targets having become preferred.

== Specifications (XKDT-1) ==
Data from Parsch

General characteristics

- Crew: None
- Length: 11 ft 10 in (3.61 m)
- Wingspan: 4 ft 11 in (1.50 m)
- Diameter: 10 ft (3.0 m)
- Gross weight: 350 lb (159 kg)
- Powerplant: 1 × Astrodyne 4NS150 solid-fuel rocket, 150 lbf (0.67 kN) thrust 3.8 seconds
- Powerplant: 1 × Astrodyne 480NS50 solid-fuel rocket, 50 lbf (0.22 kN) thrust 480 seconds

Performance

- Maximum speed: Mach 0.95
- Endurance: 8-9 minutes
- Service ceiling: 52,500 ft (16,000 m)
