= Temco 58 =

General information
- Type: Military basic trainer
- National origin: United States
- Manufacturer: Temco Aircraft
- Number built: 1

History
- First flight: 1956
- Developed from: Model 33 Plebe

The Temco 58 was a low wing single engine, tandem seat propeller driven trainer designed for sale to overseas air forces. It did not reach production.

== Design and development ==
Details of the Temco 58 were first released in January 1956. It was a development of the Model 33 Plebe, which had flown the previous year and competed unsuccessfully for a US Naval trainer contract. The Model 58 seems to have used the same airframe (N848B) but with increased span and length, and was fitted with a more powerful Lycoming engine in place of the Plebe's Continental O-470. The Model 58 was a private venture aimed at overseas air forces, capable of providing both basic and armaments training. Fully aerobatic and equipped for night flying, it was intended to be economical to buy and maintain. It had many interchangeable parts to reduce spares stocks, could have major maintenance in the field and had sixteen access hatches for easy servicing.

The Temco 58 was an all-metal, low-cantilever-wing aircraft. The tailplane was mounted on top of the fuselage and the fin and rudder were straight edged, with a small fillet. Tandem seats were enclosed with a power-driven single-piece canopy. It had retractable tricycle gear, with a rearward-hinged nose leg. It was powered by a supercharged 340 hp (234 kW) Lycoming GSO-480-A1A flat-six engine.

== Operational history ==
Only the prototype, registered N848B, is known to have flown.

== Specifications ==
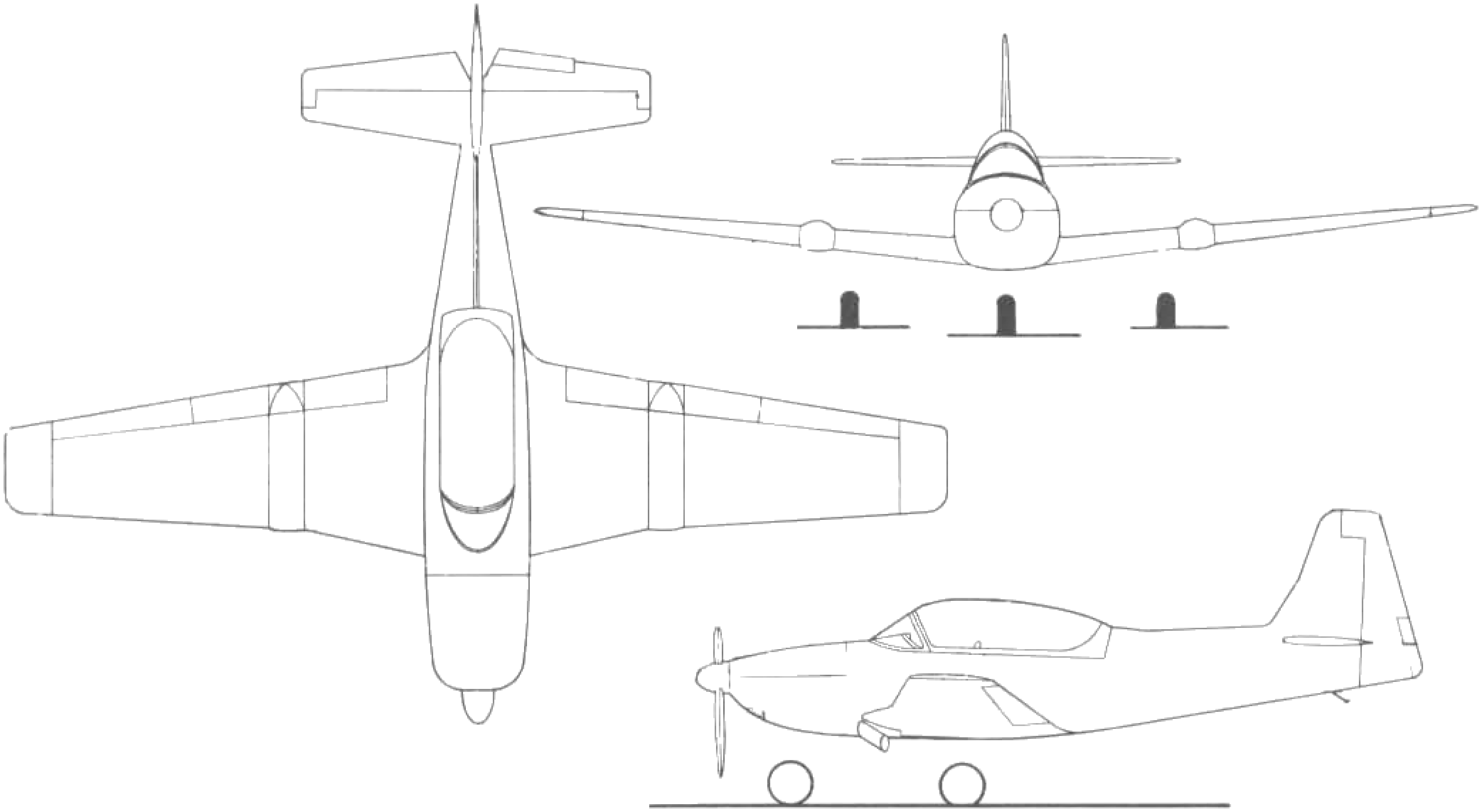
3-view line drawing of the Temco Model 58

Data from Jane's All the World's Aircraft 1956/7

General characteristics

- Crew: 2
- Length: 25 ft 10 in (7.87 m)
- Wingspan: 33 ft 2.5 in (10.122 m)
- Height: 9 ft 10 in (3.00 m)
- Wing area: 156.83 sq ft (14.570 m^{2}) gross
- Empty weight: 2,270 lb (1,030 kg)
- Gross weight: 2,993 lb (1,358 kg) unarmed
- Fuel capacity: 50 US gal (42 Imp gal, 183 L)
- Powerplant: 1 × Lycoming GSO-480-A1A 6-cylinder horizontally opposed piston engine, air cooled, 340 hp (250 kW) . Supercharged to maintain sea level power to 8,000 ft (2,450 m)
- Propellers: 3-bladed constant speed

Performance

- Maximum speed: 213 mph (343 km/h, 185 kn) at 10,000 ft (3,050 m)
- Cruise speed: 200 mph (320 km/h, 170 kn) at 10,000 ft (3,050 m)
- Stall speed: 70 mph (110 km/h, 61 kn) power off, wheels and flaps down
- Range: 558 mi (898 km, 485 nmi) at 20,000 ft (6,100 m)
- Service ceiling: 25,000 ft (7,600 m) (more than)
- Rate of climb: 1,820 ft/min (9.2 m/s) at sea level
- Time to altitude: 6 min to 10,000 ft (3,050 m)

Armament
Provision for

- 2 × 0.30 in (7.62 mm) or 0.20 in (5.08 mm) guns
- 2 × Napalm tanks
- 2 × 100 lb (45.3 kg) bombs
- 16 × 1.18 in (30 mm) rockets
