= Hagerstown Aviation Museum =

- Location within Maryland Location within the United States
- Established: 14 July 2005
- Location: Hagerstown, Maryland
- Coordinates: 39.706566°N 77.726246°W
- Type: Aviation museum
- President: John Seburn
- Curator: Kurtis Meyers
- Website: hagerstownaviationmuseum.org

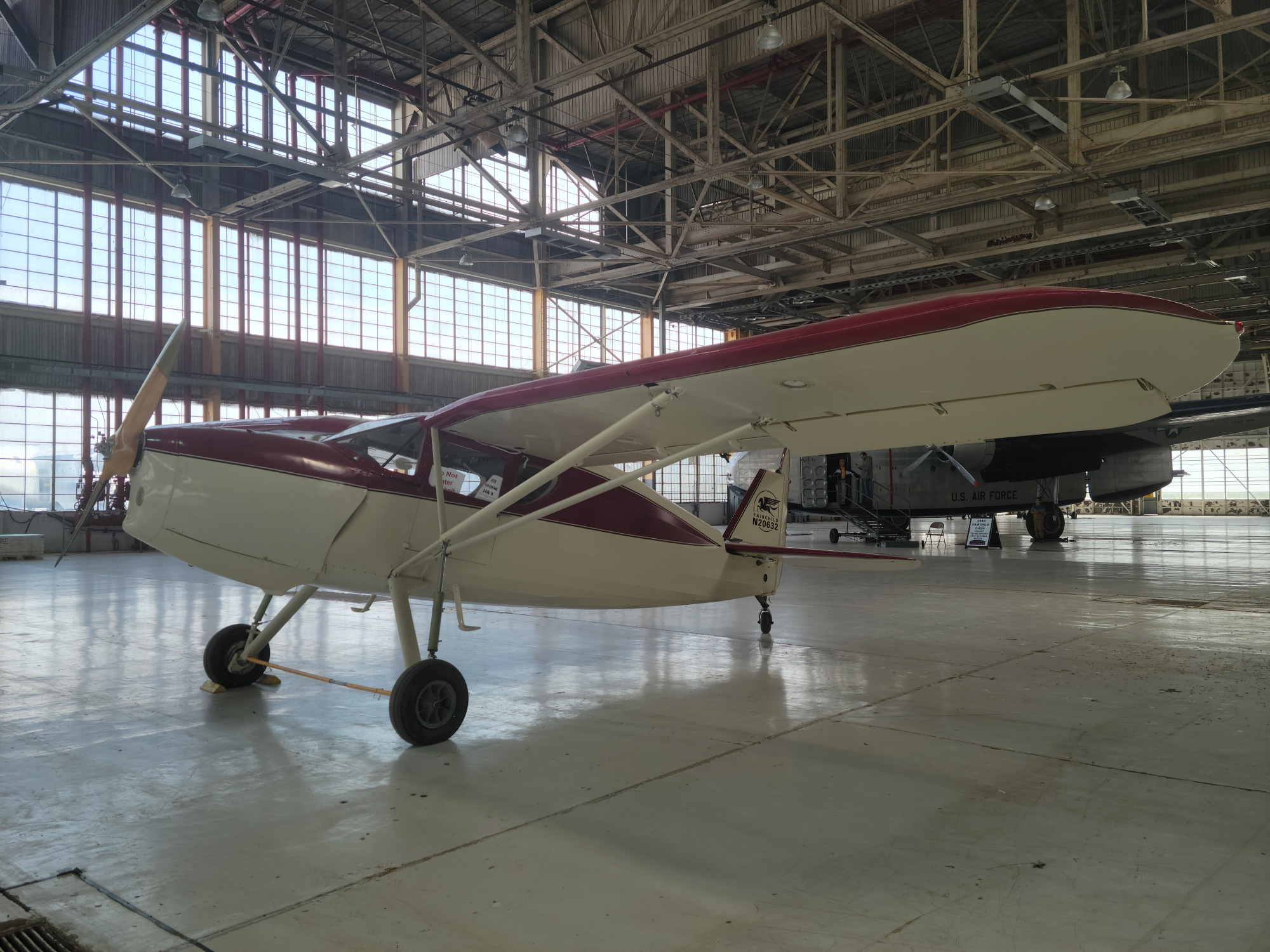
1939 Fairchild 24R-9

The Hagerstown Aviation Museum is an aviation museum at the Hagerstown Regional Airport in Hagerstown, Maryland. It is focused on the history of the Fairchild Aircraft Corporation.

== History ==
The idea for an aviation museum in Hagerstown began in 1995 with a group of individuals that included Richard Henson, Kent Mitchell, John Seburn, and Kurtis Meyers. After a decade of delays, the museum opened to the public at the Discovery Station in downtown Hagerstown, Maryland on 14 July 2005. The following year, the museum led a community fundraising effort and purchased a Fairchild C-82 Packet, the first of a series of cargo airplanes produced by Fairchild in Hagerstown. This airplane was purchased at the liquidation auction of Hawkins and Powers in Greybull, Wyoming.

The museum purchased a C-123 and trucked it to the airport in 2019.

After originally considering building a new hangar, the museum moved to the former Fairchild Aircraft Flight Test Hangar in 2020 and purchased the building three years later.

The museum held a grand opening on 14 September 2024.

The museum received an A-10C in 2025.

== Collection ==
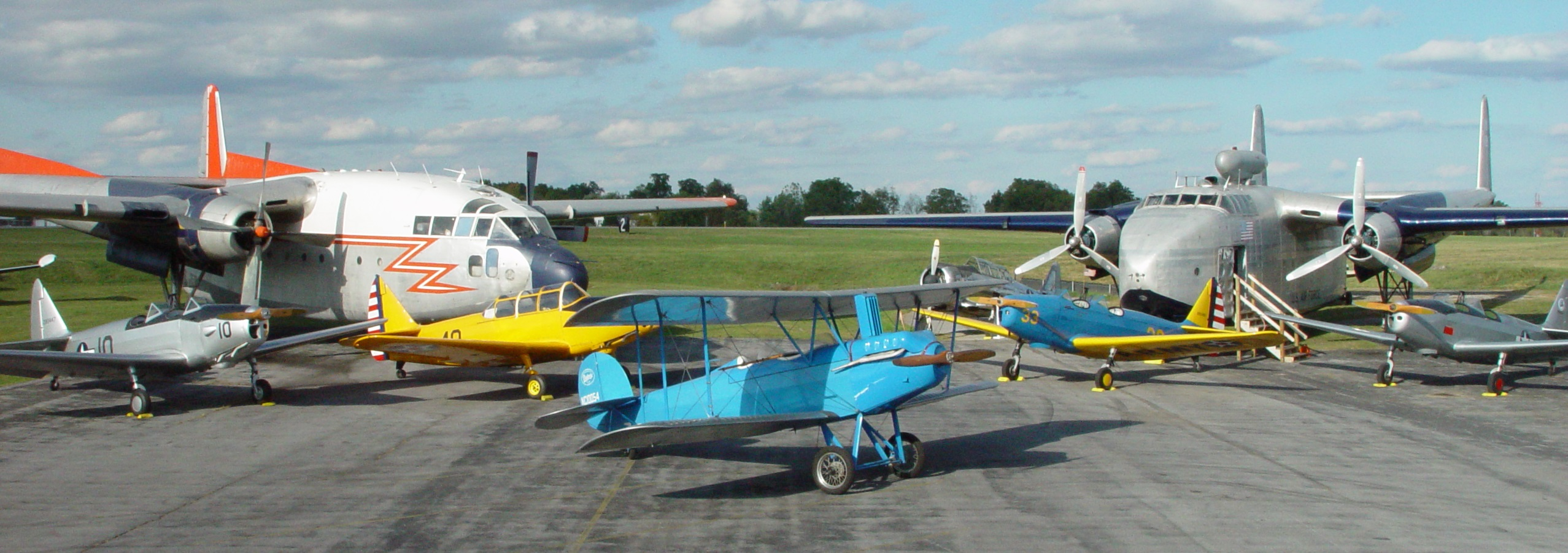
The museum's aircraft

=== Aircraft on display ===
- Bellanca CE – Original fuselage
- Fairchild 22 C7D 922
- Fairchild 24R-9 R9-405
- Fairchild 24R-46 R46-129
- Fairchild C-82A Packet 45-57814
- Fairchild C-119G Flying Boxcar 22111
- Fairchild C-123K Provider 54-0681
- Fairchild PT-19A 42-65485
- Fairchild PT-19A 42-83447
- Fairchild PT-19A 44-33689
- Fairchild PT-23
- Fairchild PT-26
- Fairchild UC-61C 42-70862
- Fairchild XNQ 75726
- Fairchild Republic A-10C Thunderbolt II 79-0087
- Kreider-Reisner KR-31
- North American T-6G Texan 49-3390

=== Aircraft in storage ===
- Bell UH-1V Iroquois
- Fairchild C-123K Provider 54-0592
- Fairchild F-27F 33
- Fairchild RC-26B

== See also ==
- List of aviation museums
