= Robert F. Yonash =

Robert F. (Bob) Yonash
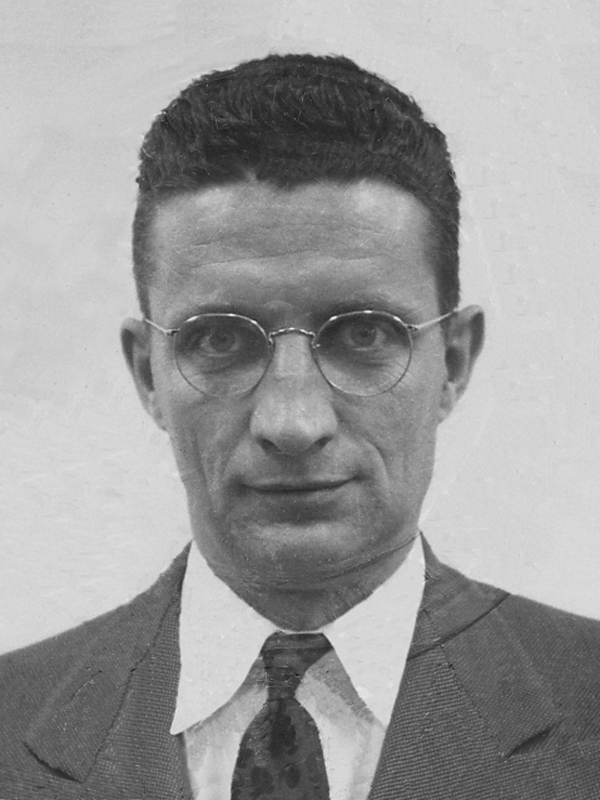
- Born: February 7, 1919; Wadena, Minnesota
- Died: April 19, 1997 (aged 78); Sebastopol, California
- Occupations: Aircraft engineer, entrepreneur

Robert F. Yonash (February 7, 1919 – April 19, 1997) was an American engineer in the early days of the aircraft industry. He was a member of the start-up management team for the Texas Engineering & Manufacturing Company (TEMCO), which eventually became the "T" in the conglomerate Ling-Temco-Vought (LTV). He was the co-founder, with Harold Silver, of the Intercontinental Manufacturing Company (IMCO), which is currently owned by General Dynamics.

Yonash made an important contribution to the aircraft industry after World War II by finding ways to ease the transition from wartime production to a consumer-based economy, as well as from an aircraft industry to the military-industrial complex that characterized the Cold War.

Following his career in the aircraft industry, Yonash was an entrepreneur in Sonoma County, California, for nearly forty years.

== Private life ==
=== Early years ===
Bob Yonash was the firstborn child and only son of Frank Yonash and Esther Mary Jacobsen. At the time of his birth on February 7, 1919, his parents resided on a homestead near Plevna, Montana. His mother went to her mother's home in Wadena, Minnesota, for his birth.

Yonash's father immigrated from Bohemia, which was then a part of the Austro-Hungarian Empire, arriving at Ellis Island on September 5, 1908. His mother descended from immigrants of Denmark and Luxembourg, who settled in Iowa and later moved to Wadena.

In 1927, the Yonash family moved to the Los Angeles, California, area where they managed an apartment house for several years before settling on a farm in Bellflower, California.

=== Education ===
Yonash attended Downey high school where analytical and spherical geometry were among his favorite subjects. His least favorite topics were chemistry and physics labs.

Before he was 17 years old, he was skilled at welding aluminum, and used this expertise to repair the aluminum tail cones of racing cars, which were powered by outboard motors. A frequent driver tactic created opportunity for him to practice his welding skills. Drivers would run a car onto the tail cone of the car ahead, rendering the lead car's steering inoperative and resulting in continuous damage to the aluminum tail cones. From race cars to aircraft was a logical step.

Following high school he attended college for a year.

=== Marriage and family ===
Yonash married three times. His first wife was Gwendolyn Tull, mother of his daughter Robin. She was the daughter of Frank Tull of Kansas and Zella Cox of Illinois. The marriage ended in divorce after six years. He then married Virginia Doerr, the socialite daughter of R. Edward Blaney Doerr, president of the Murray Gin Company in Dallas, and Louise Nelms. They had a son Richard. This marriage lasted until his wife's death in 1975. His final marriage, to Jan Robbins, endured until his death.

=== Death ===
In early 1997, following nearly forty years as a Sonoma County entrepreneur, Bob moved to the Fircrest Convalescent Hospital in Sebastopol, California, where he died on April 19, 1997, at age 78.

== Working life ==
=== Aircraft Industry ===
Yonash got involved in the aircraft industry just as the transition from fabric and wood frames to metal was in its early stages. When he started his first job, powered flight had been a reality for less than 33 years.

==== Yonash recalled his start in the aircraft Industry ====
In an oral history shortly before his death, Yonash recalled how he got his start in the aircraft industry.

"It was the middle of the Great Depression, and I had just unloaded a boxcar load of Borax with a wheelbarrow and shovel. It took me three days and I was paid three dollars, which was a good wage for the time: one man, one day, one dollar.

"On my way home I noticed a line of men outside a factory, so I stopped and got in line as you did during the Depression. I asked one of the guys in line who was hiring and he said, “Vultee Aviation.” I thought, “What do I know about airplanes?” I did have a little experience with aluminum welding, although at the time I didn't know I couldn't have passed their certification test.

"The guy two in front of me, when asked what he was, said, “Aluminum welder.” Their response was, “Sorry, we have all the welders we need.” When they came to the guy in front of me, he said, “Sheet metal worker.” They asked, “Can you read a blueprint?” and when he said “no,” they dismissed him too.

"When they asked me, I said “I’m a sheet metal worker.” When they asked, “Can you read a blueprint?” I answered, “Of course,” which was true. After a quick test of my blueprint-reading skills, they hired me and said, “Show up Monday with your tools.” So I went home, took an empty fish tackle box, and filled it with everything that might be construed to be a sheet metal-working tool. When I showed up for work the foreman asked me, “Can you run a nibbler?” I said, “Sure, where is it?” Luckily it was a fairly simple machine for blanking sheet metal parts, and it was relatively easy to master.

"Shortly thereafter, I moved into the drop hammer department."

==== Vultee Airplane Development Corporation ====
Yonash was a drop hammer operator at Vultee Airplane Development Corporation in Downey, California from May 26, 1936, to September 25, 1936. This was his first job outside of the family. In May 1936, he was 17 and the Great Depression was still going on.

He began work in the aluminum stamping department. Here he worked as a drop hammer operator's assistant, The parts produced in this department were pre-formed shapes for various sections of the fuselage and wings. These sections would then be combined with other sections to complete the whole assembly.

During a discussion among workers in the Vultee stamping department a sign of Yonash's early ambition surfaced. The workers were discussing what their plans were for the future. He remained quiet for most of the conversation, When asked what his plans were, his reply was that he planned on running the place and that he would leave the company when he turned 35, This was met with laughs, and guffaws. His prediction came true. He was in his late twenties when he became a vice president. By the time he was 35 he did leave the employ of others and became a full-time entrepreneur for the rest of his life.

When he was laid off on September 25, 1936, Yonash was rated “very good” on ability, conduct, and production. He was “laid off because of lack of work,” but was marked “we would re-employ.”

==== Lockheed Aircraft Corporation ====
From October 26, 1936, to March 3, 1939, Yonash worked for Lockheed at its Burbank, California plant between his two stints for Vultee. Initially, he was a Junior Drop Hammer Operator, and was promoted to Senior Drop Hammer Operator on January 22, 1937. When he left, he was rated “very good” on ability and production, but only “good” on conduct.

At Lockheed, Yonash was involved with the development of the P-38 Lightning double-tailed pursuit plane, which along with the North American P-51, was one of his proudest achievements. He designed the tooling for the P-38 wings.

==== Vultee Aircraft, Inc. ====
In 1939 Yonash returned to Vultee in Downey, now known as Vultee Aircraft, Inc. He started as a Sheet Metal – Production Worker on a Drill Press, then moved up to Inspector on December 4, 1939. On June 17, 1940, he became the Tool Design Night Liaison, and then the Tool Design Liaison on July 8, 1940.

==== American Central Manufacturing Corporation ====
Yonash was the Chief Tool Engineer, in charge of the Tooling Department, in the Connersville, Indiana, plant of the Aircraft Division of American Central Manufacturing Corporation (AMC) from May 1, 1941, to January 31, 1944. AMC was one of many general manufacturing companies which switched their focus to subcontracting the production of materiel during World War II. He worked on the tooling for one of the wing sections of the B-24 Liberator Bomber. His department's efforts rated an article in the company newsletter. Photos and drawing of some of the tooling his department produced still survive.

While he was nominally based in Indiana, AMC was only one of several subcontractors whose products had to be assembled together. Thus Yonash spent a lot of his time traveling from one company to another making sure everything was working. In his later years, he used to tell how he would carry his dirty clothes from one airline stop to the next one, where he would drop them off for cleaning and pick up the clean ones from the last time he went through there.

During this time at AMC Yonash met Art Jairett, who remained a lifelong friend.

==== North American Aviation, Inc. ====
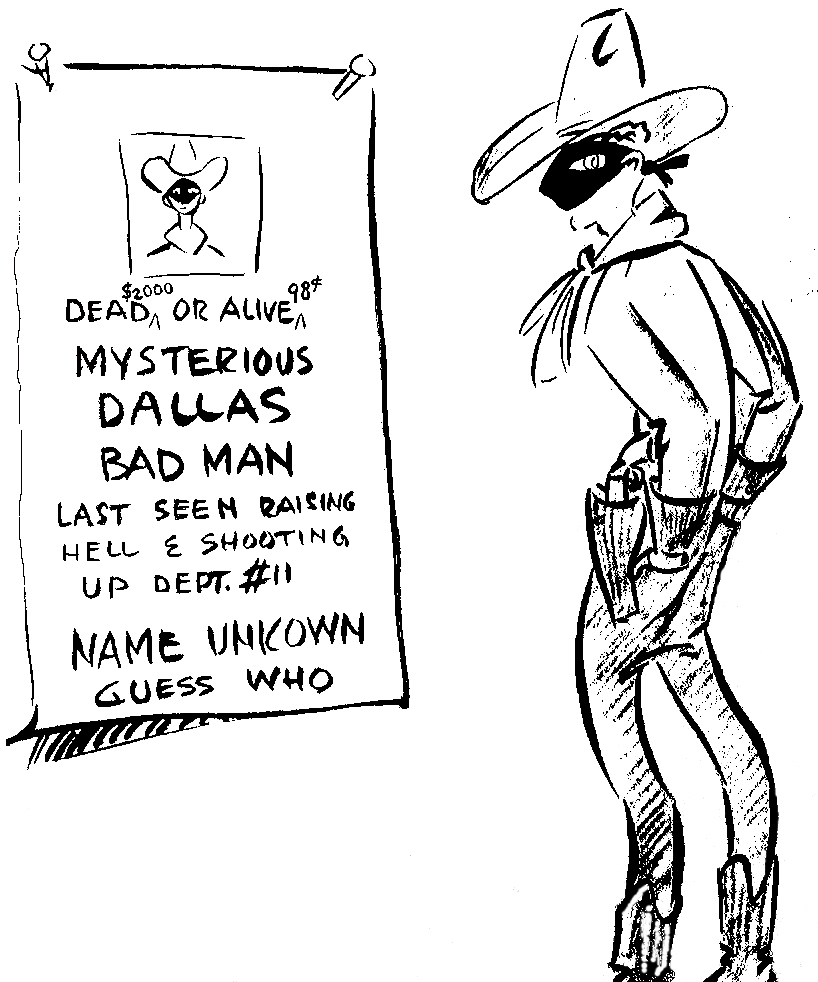
Bob Yonash Wanted Poster

At North American Aviation, Yonash worked in the Dallas, Texas, plant on the tooling for the P-51 Mustang wings. The challenge here was that the wings attached to the fuselage of the plane at an angle. Prior to Yonash's involvement the manufacturing and assembly process was very time consuming. With his tooling design, productivity improved significantly. Yonash worked for North American from January 1944 to July 1945.

At North American, Yonash first met Bob McCulloch, who was to remain instrumental in his career until he “retired” from working for others. Yonash and McCulloch remained friends until McCulloch's death in 1995.

Yonash was well known for doing things his own way, and one day came into work to find this cartoon on the bulletin board.

==== Menasco Manufacturing Company ====
Yonash was a Department Manager for the Menasco Manufacturing Company in Burbank, California, from August 23, 1945, to January 25, 1946.

==== Texas Engineering & Manufacturing Company (TEMCO) ====
Yonash was a member of the start-up management team for Texas Engineering & Manufacturing Company (TEMCO) in Dallas, Texas, which was created as part of an effort to ease the transition from wartime production. He was Chief Production Engineer from January 16, 1946, to November 30, 1947. On June 17, 1946, Yonash was appointed the head of the new Department 25, known as “General Products.” This department produced an automated popcorn machine, Venetian blind clips, and other consumer-oriented products. Later on, it also assembled the tractors for the Intercontinental Manufacturing Company (IMCO).

==== R.P.M. ====
R.P.M. was a manufacturing consulting company in the Dallas, Texas, area. The letters in the company name stood for Research, Production, and Marketing. TEMCO was one of its clients.

Yonash was the vice president for production at R.P.M. from December 1947 to March 1948. He left to be a consultant on his own, listing himself with the Republic National Bank of Dallas, among others. This led directly to him becoming involved in the startup of the Intercontinental Manufacturing Company (IMCO).

==== Intercontinental Manufacturing Company (IMCO)/Brady Aviation ====
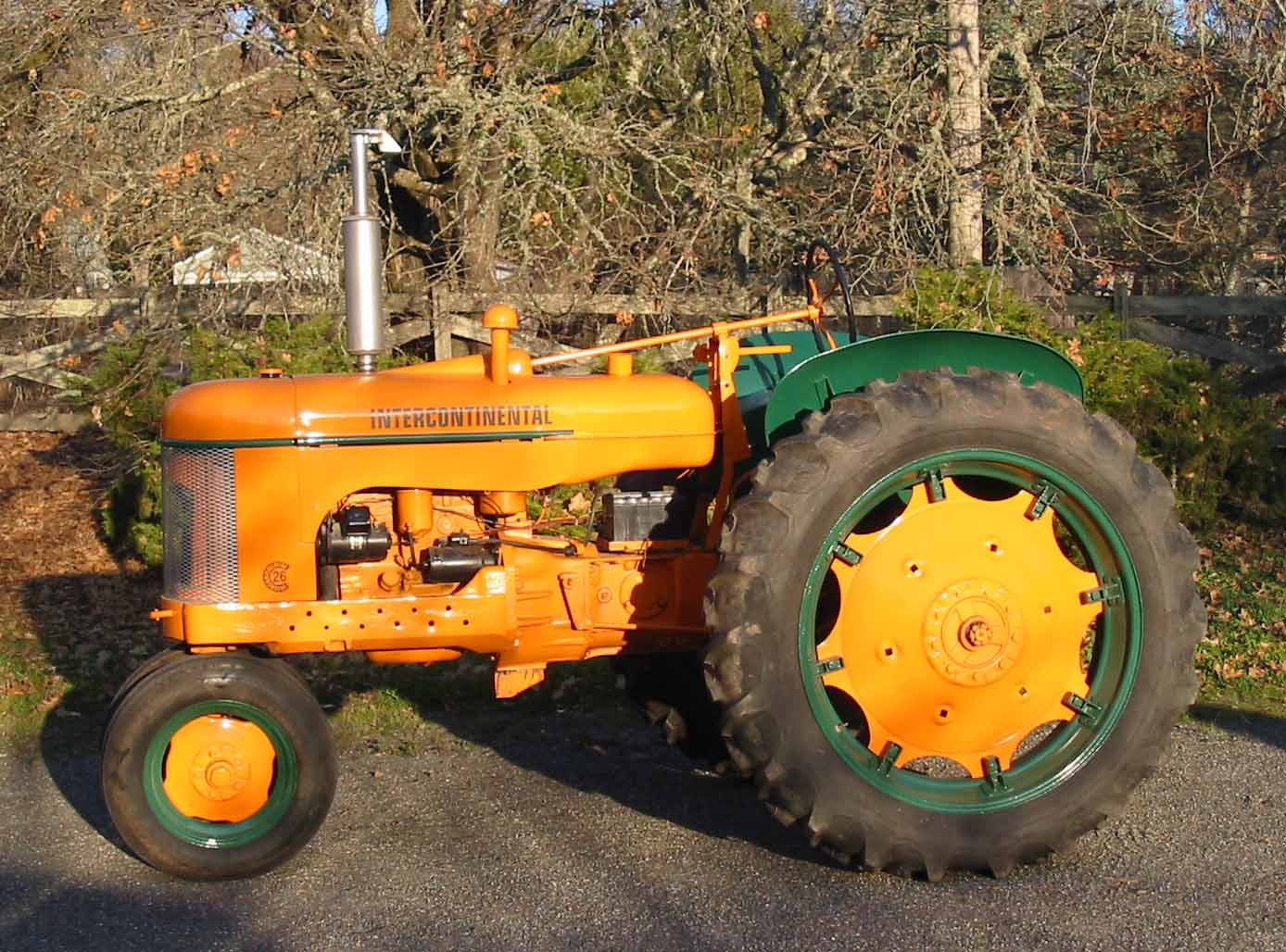
IMCO Gasoline Tractor in 2011

The Intercontinental Manufacturing Company (IMCO) came into being in April 1948, in space subleased from TEMCO in the former North American plant near Dallas, with Harold J. Silver as President and Yonash as vice president with the intent of filling the order from Argentina for several thousand tractors due the end of the year. Because of the short delivery time, the tractor was built mostly from existing parts such as motors from the Continental Motors Company and axles built by the Timken Company. Yonash's old company, TEMCO, was contracted to do the assembly.

Yonash shipped one of the IMCO tractors to his parents in Iowa Hill, California where it served a productive life on the Kings Hill Ranch before being moved, this time to Sonoma County. . After Bob's death in 1997, Bob's son donated it to a tractor enthusiast to have during his lifetime with the understanding that it would be returned to Bob's son when the man died. However, the man became ill before he could do the work and he passed the tractor on to Mark Strusz, who completed the restoration ~1999. In 2011, Strusz returned the tractor to its Bob's son in exchange for being reimbursed for the cost of the work.

By the early 1950s, IMCO bought the Southern Aircraft 100,000-square-foot (9,300 m^{2}) manufacturing plant located on Amundsen Road in Garland, Texas. Ray Shape, who had been a V.P. at Southern, moved to IMCO as Executive Vice President. Shape invited a friend of his, Ed Hancock, to interview for a position with IMCO, and Hancock was hired to be V.P of Production. The Shapes, Hancocks, and Yonashes became close friends, and the friendship continued even after Yonash moved back to California.

In mid-1951, IMCO expanded to the Brady, Texas, area, starting up Brady Aviation at Curtis Field. Yonash was the driving force in the successful post-war conversion of the former aircraft plant in Brady. Brady Aviation, named for the town in which it resided, was a large part of the local industrial base. When the company choose to expand its plant with a $1.5 million addition, front-page headlines were in order for the Brady Herald.

In another twist on Yonash's former employment, IMCO had a contract to do sheet metal and machine work for Consolidated Vultee Aircraft (Convair).

Yonash was vice president, production with IMCO from April 1948 to 1954. This was his last formal job before achieving his goal of "retirement" at 35.

=== Years of Transition--Iowa Hill and Foresthill ===
In 1954, Yonash met his long-time goal of “retirement” at age 35 and quit working for other people. For the rest of his life, he was a self-employed entrepreneur.

In August, 1954, Yonash moved his family to the Iowa Hill, California, property in the Sierra Nevada (U.S.) foothills which he and his parents had purchased in 1949, near the site of the future Auburn Dam. His parents had previously moved there with his daughter to serve as custodians. Part of this property was one of the last private purchases of land from the Southern Pacific Company.

The ranch house, while large, was not big enough for two families, so Yonash, with his father, set about building his own house about ¼ mile east of the ranch house. He also realized a longtime dream of building a log cabin, similar to what he and his parents had lived in on the Montana homestead.

In 1955, with the assistance of Carl Adamson, who owned the Iowa Hill Store at the time, and other members of the community, Yonash installed a dial telephone line from Iowa Hill to Colfax, California, with a link to Kings Hill and other locations near Iowa Hill. The line was in operation for over ten years, but after the Kings Hill property was sold in the mid-1960s. The line eventually became inoperational because there was no one to keep it in repair since both Yonash and Adamson moved away.

In 1957, after a one-year ownership of the Forest House Hotel in Foresthill, California, Yonash busied himself and the rest of the family with planting a walnut orchard while he was looking for other prospects.

=== Sonoma County entrepreneur ===
In 1959 Yonash began exploring opportunities in Sonoma County, California.

==== Rural Estates, Inc. ====
Yonash's first corporation in the Sonoma County area was Rural Estates, Inc. which owned the Joy Woods property near Occidental, California, and logged it. Shortly after this, Rural Estates bought property in Rural Canyon near Forestville, California, and logged it as well.

Yonash's approach to logging was to leave enough trees so that the properly could later be subdivided and sold and still be attractive to potential buyers. After logging the Rural Canyon property, Yonash tried selling it at $1,500 per acre lot but with little success. Then he came up with a different approach. For many potential buyers the work of preparing a building site for a cabin was too difficult and the permitting process too complex. Yonash decided to complete most of the initial work by preparing the site and erecting a pre-fabricated shell which was no more than a one-room cabin with the basic amenities installed: water, septic and electricity. The construction techniques were unique, in that conventional stud walls were not used. Instead, the walls and roof sheeting were 2X6 tongue-and-groove redwood. It was left to the owners to finish the interior. This approach greatly increased sales.

==== Pallets ====
In 1967, Yonash leased the old Santa Rosa airport property and started building pallets from re-sawn lumber. This was during the Vietnam War, and there was an ongoing demand for pallets as they were never shipped back but were taken apart in ‘Nam and used as local building materials. Pallets were also sold for domestic use in the US.

==== Industrial Woodcraft, Inc. ====
In 1968, Yonash purchased the Nulaid property in Petaluma, California, and sold the pallet factory. The Nulaid facility formerly belonged to the California Egg Producers Association. The facility had many separate sections, each used for a different part of the egg producing process. Additions of various construction styles were built at different times. This made the whole facility rather impractical for use by a plant needing open space. Rather than try to find one tenant who could use the entire facility, Yonash decided to make each section into an independent unit fitted with the proper amenities such as wash rooms, etc., thus having many smaller units to rent separately. The return from this scheme paid the properly off every three years.

About the same time, Yonash became involved with using a portable sawmill that could be “taken to the tree.” This allowed redwood trees that had been left as slash from logging to be cut into usable lumber. But the next question was, what to use it for? This led to the birth of Industrial Woodcraft in 1970, located in the old Nulaid property. The founding of Industrial Woodcraft was based on a business principle that Yonash had formulated which said “the smaller the piece the higher the price.” Industrial Woodcraft took “junk” wood and re-sawed it into items such as grape stakes, planter boxes, etc., as well as all manner of custom cut wood for various enterprises—whatever there was a market for.

The company operated as a custom cutting business, cutting and fabricating wood products to order. One of the secrets of the company was its unique production machinery. For instance, grape stakes seem very simple to cut, but one cut at a time to form the points is a difficult and costly task when thousands of stakes are being produced. To solve this problem, a special machine capable of cutting the complete point in one operation was designed by Yonash using his expertise as an Industrial Designer. Two saw blades operating in unison would cut both points of the stakes in one pass. The stakes could be fed in stacks of 5 per cycle. This worked out to a rate of 5,000 stakes per day. It wasn't enough that the machine could cut both sides of the point in one pass, the machine operated on a cam mechanism which made it automatic as well. Innovations such as this made the company very competitive.

==== Empire West, Inc. ====
Empire West, Inc., a plastics vacuum-forming business, was the final company with which Yonash was involved. Originally located in the old Nulaid properly, it moved to Graton, California, in the early 1980s. It was his son's business, but until just before his death Yonash stayed closely involved, contributing both his experience of business operation and his skills and knowledge as an Industrial Designer to make the molds required for the various products. Empire West, Inc. continues to thrive. Its latest product is Ceilume Ceiling Tiles.
