= North American XSN2J =

XSN2J-1
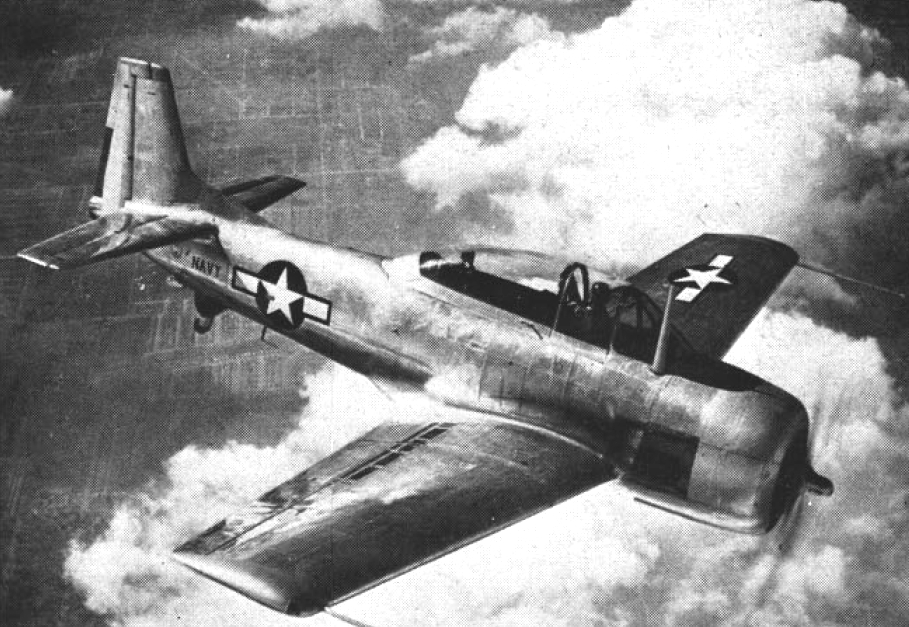

General information
- Type: Trainer aircraft
- National origin: United States
- Manufacturer: North American Aviation
- Status: Cancelled
- Primary user: United States Navy
- Number built: 2

History
- First flight: 10 February 1947
- Developed into: T-28 Trojan

The North American XSN2J-1, also known by the company designation NA-142, was developed for the United States Navy by North American Aviation as a replacement for the SNJ Texan as an advanced scout-trainer. Designed in competition with the Fairchild XNQ, the XSN2J-1 first flew on 15 February 1947, two aircraft being evaluated by the Navy. Neither aircraft was considered satisfactory in evaluations; in addition, restrictions on the Navy's budget meant that the aircraft could not be ordered at the time, and the program was cancelled in 1948. The similar T-28 Trojan would later be ordered to fill the Navy's requirement for a new trainer.

== Specifications ==
Data from

General characteristics

- Crew: Two (student and instructor)
- Length: 32 ft (9.8 m)
- Wingspan: 41 ft (12 m)
- Wing area: 236 sq ft (21.9 m^{2})
- Empty weight: 5,500 lb (2,495 kg)
- Gross weight: 7,500 lb (3,402 kg)
- Powerplant: 1 × Wright R-1820-78 Cyclone radial, 1,100 hp (820 kW)
- Propellers: 3-bladed Hamilton Standard Hydromatic constant-speed propeller, 10 ft 9 1/2 in (3.29 m) diameter

Performance

- Maximum speed: 270 mph (430 km/h, 230 kn)
- Cruise speed: 190 mph (310 km/h, 170 kn)
- Stall speed: 75 mph (121 km/h, 65 kn)
- Range: 1,600 mi (2,600 km, 1,400 nmi)
- Service ceiling: 30,000 ft (9,100 m) service
- Rate of climb: 2,000 ft/min (10 m/s)

== See also ==
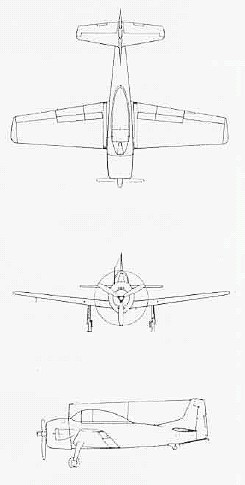
Three-view of XSN2J-1

Related development

- North American T-28 Trojan

Aircraft of comparable role, configuration, and era

- Fairchild XNQ
- North American T-6 Texan

Related lists

- List of United States Navy aircraft designations (pre-1962)
