= ASM-N-8 Corvus =

XASM-N-8 Corvus
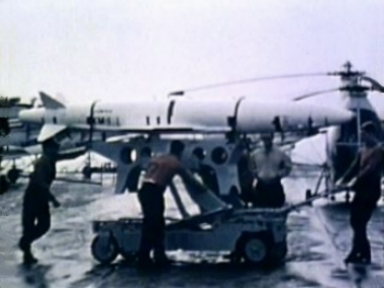
- Type: Air-to-surface missile/anti-radiation missile
- Place of origin: United States

Service history
- Used by: United States Navy

Production history
- Designer: Temco Aircraft
- Designed: 1955-1960

Specifications
- Mass: 790 kg (1750 lb)
- Length: 4.88 m (16 ft)
- Diameter: 48 cm (19 in)
- Wingspan: 152 cm (5 ft)
- Warhead weight: W-40 nuclear fission (10 kt)
- Engine: Thiokol liquid-fueled rocket 4.4 kN (1,000 lb)
- Operational range: 315 km (170 nm)
- Flight ceiling: 15,200 m (50,000 ft)
- Maximum speed: Mach 3.75
- Guidance system: Passive radar homing
- Launch platform: A-4B Skyhawk

The ASM-N-8 Corvus was an anti-radiation missile developed by Temco Aircraft for the United States Navy.

== History ==
In April 1955, the U.S. Navy planned the acquisition of a long-range air-to-surface missile armed with a nuclear warhead. This weapon should be carried by the carrier-based North American A3J Vigilante and Douglas A4D Skyhawk. This missile was named ASM-N-8 Raven. Later that year, the project was changed to a nuclear armed anti-radar missile, and renamed Corvus. Temco Aircraft was awarded a development contract in January 1957. The first flight of an XASM-N-8 missile occurred in July 1959. By March 1960, fully guided flights had been made at the Pacific Missile Test Center at Point Mugu, California. However, the program was cancelled in July 1960, when the overall responsibility for long-range nuclear air-to-surface missiles was transferred to the United States Air Force, which had no use for the Corvus missile.

== Specifications ==
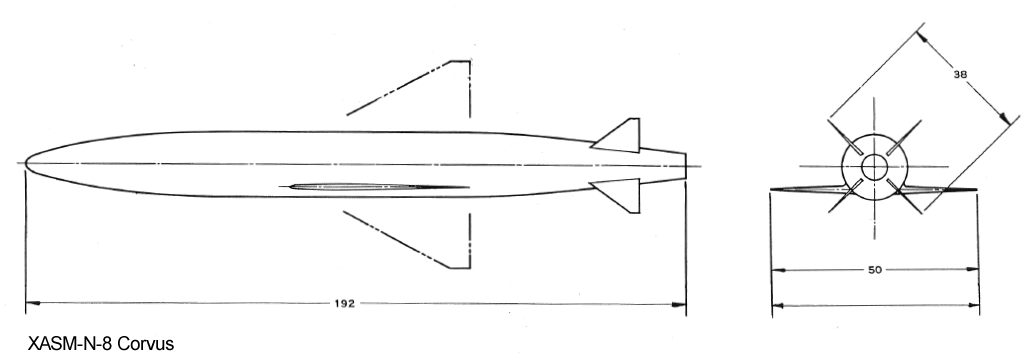

The XASM-N-8 had two delta wings and cruciform tailfins for flight stability and control. It was powered by a Thiokol liquid-fueled rocket, which gave it a range of 315 km for high-altitude launches and 185 km for low-altitude launches. Normally the missile would use a passive radar seeker and home on shore-based and ship-based radars. It could also home on non-radiating targets which were illuminated by a radar of the launching aircraft. The Corvus missile was to be armed with a W40 nuclear warhead of 10 kt yield.

== Gallery ==
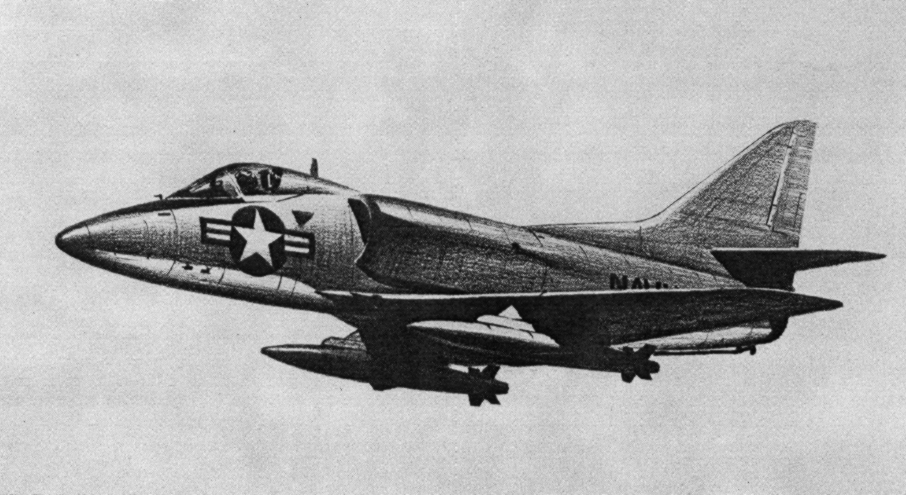
Artist's impression of an A4D-2 with two Corvus-missiles

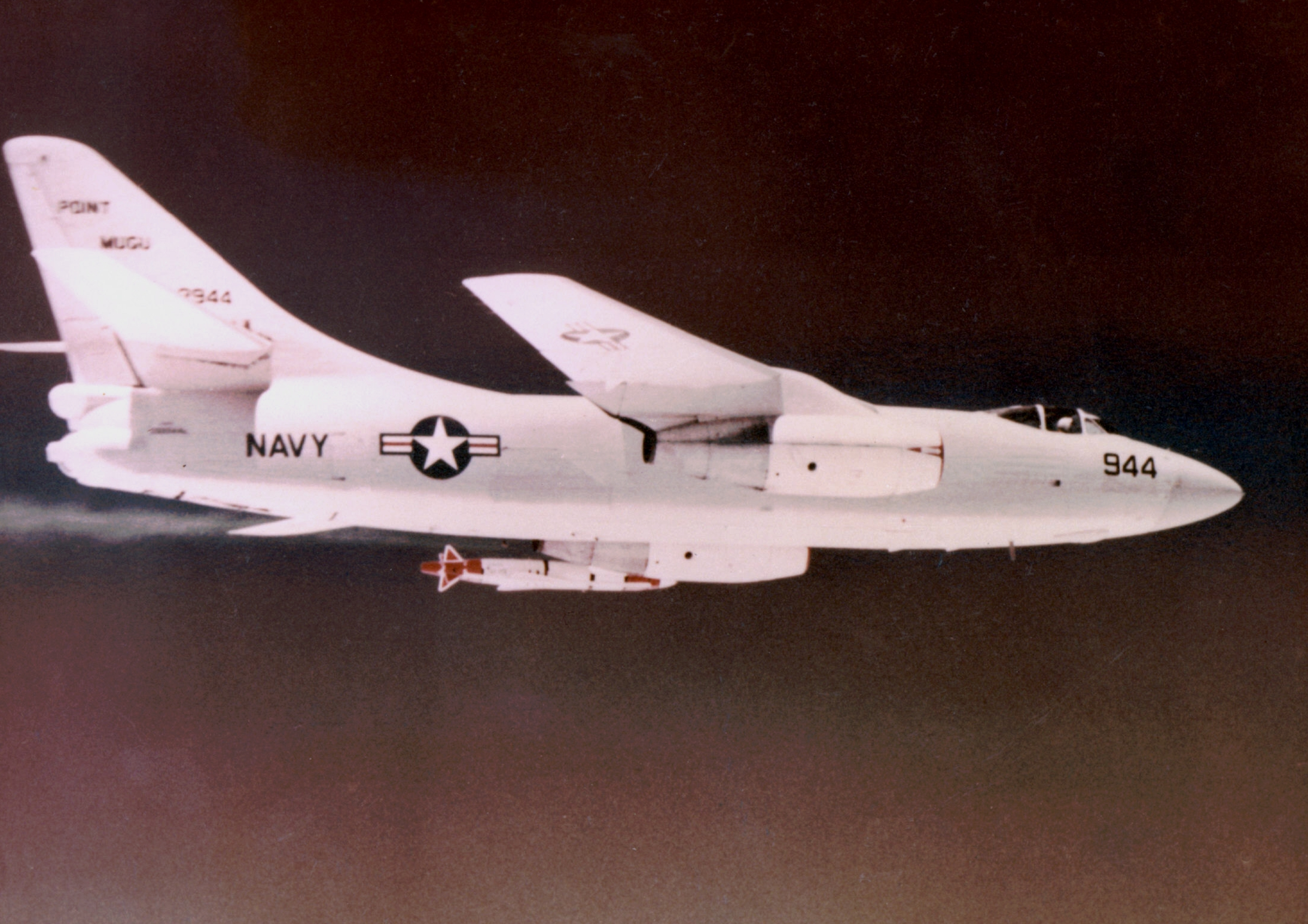
XASM-N-8 Corvus on an A3D-2.

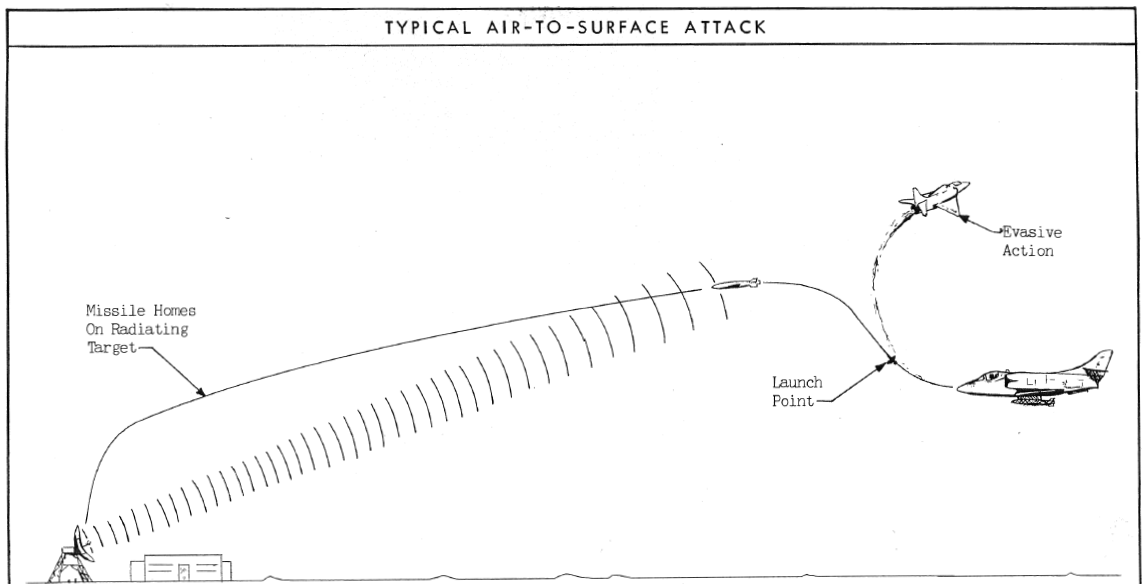
Planned mission profile for an ASM-N-8 attack.
