= Fairchild XNQ =

American trainer aircraft

XNQ/T-31
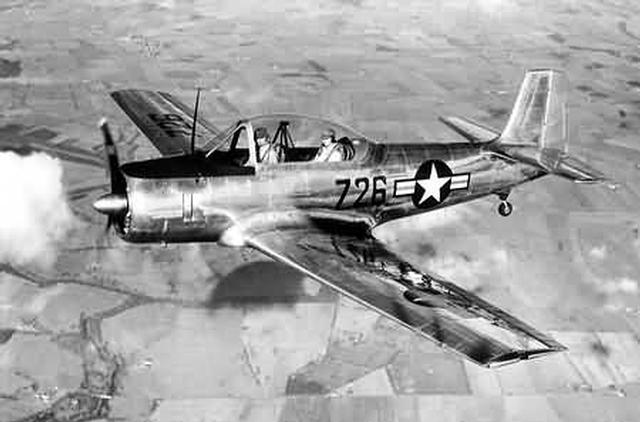
- Fairchild XNQ-1 tested as the T-31

General information
- Type: Primary trainer
- National origin: United States
- Manufacturer: Fairchild
- Number built: 2

History
- First flight: 7 October 1946

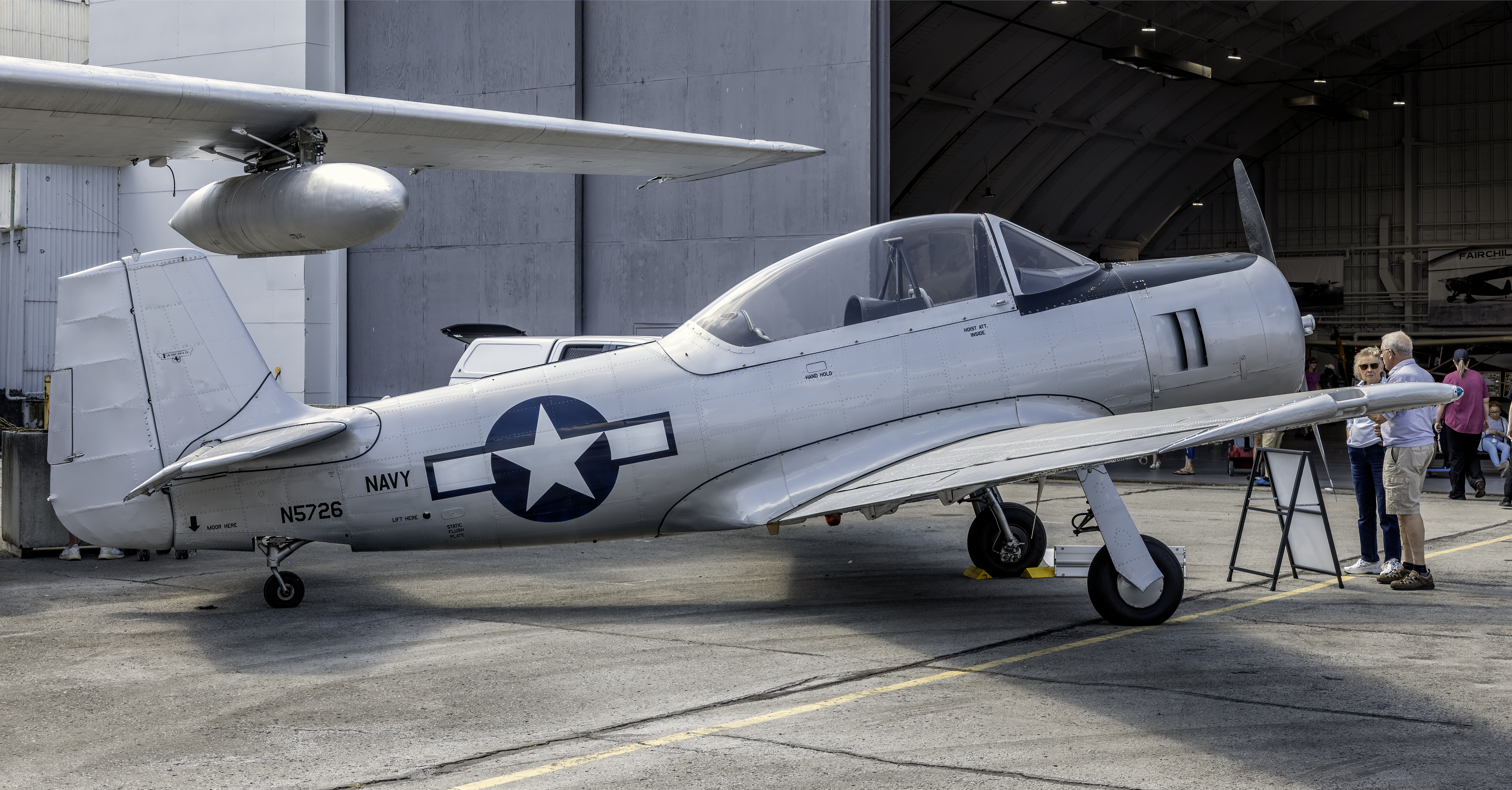
Fairchild XNQ at the Hagerstown Aviation Museum in 2024

The Fairchild XNQ (T-31; Model M-92) is an American trainer designed as a standard primary trainer for the United States Navy during the 1940s.

== Design and development ==
Designed by Fairchild Aircraft as a replacement for current primary trainers, the XNQ-1 featured a controllable-pitch propeller, flaps, electrically operated retractable landing gear and all-metal skin with fabric-covered rudder, ailerons and elevators. Its unobstructed bubble canopy provided instructors and students seated in tandem with good visibility, and its cockpit instruments were arranged to match those found in contemporary jet fighters.

== Operational history ==
The XNQ-1 basic/advanced trainer was developed for the U.S. Navy and was first flown by Richard Henson on 7 October 1946. Two prototypes were flown as XNQ-1 (BuNo. 75725 & 75726). Delivered to the U.S. Navy in 1947 for trials, they were rejected due to problems with exhaust fumes leaking into the cockpit. The first prototype was subsequently to receive a number of engine changes, first powered with a 320 hp Lycoming R-680-13, then finally with a horizontally opposed 350 hp Lycoming GSO-580. The aircraft was destroyed in a crash in 1950.

The second aircraft (BuNo. 75726), with a larger stabilizer, was evaluated by the United States Air Force in 1949 as a replacement for the AT-6, with the USAF selecting it on 24 March 1949 as a primary trainer. Designed to be aerobatic to teach pilots maneuvers, such as stalls, spins and rolls, Fairchild received a contract for 100 Model 129s under the USAF designation T-31. However, the order was cancelled later in 1949, in favor of the Beech T-34 Mentor.

Fairchild dropped plans to develop the design as the company concentrated on other production contracts, including the C-119 Flying Boxcar.

== Surviving aircraft ==
The second aircraft, privately owned, is still on the civil register as of 2021 in airworthy condition. The aircraft was donated to the Hagerstown Aviation Museum in Hagerstown, Maryland in 2024.

== Specifications ==
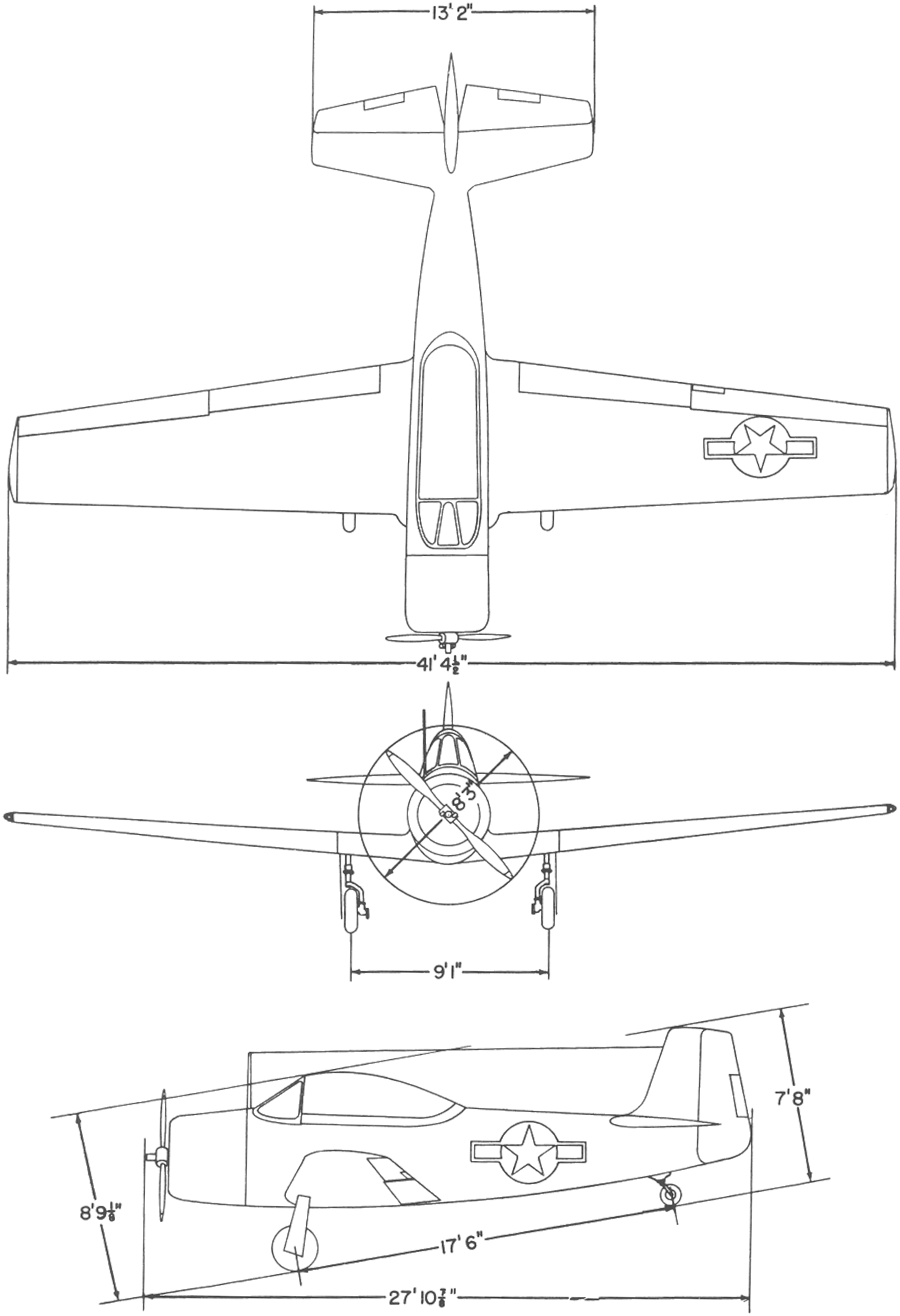
3-view line drawing of the Fairchild XNQ

Data from Jane's all the World's Aircraft 1947

General characteristics

- Crew: 2
- Length: 27 ft 11 in (8.51 m)
- Wingspan: 41 ft 5 in (12.62 m)
- Height: 8 ft 10 in (2.7 m)
- Empty weight: 2,974 lb (1,349 kg)
- Gross weight: 3,700 lb (1,678 kg)
- Powerplant: 1 × Lycoming R-680-13 9-cyl. air-cooled radial piston engine, 320 hp (240 kW)

Performance

- Maximum speed: 175 mph (282 km/h, 152 kn)
- Range: 955 mi (1,537 km, 830 nmi)
- Service ceiling: 16,000 ft (4,900 m)

== See also ==
Aircraft of comparable role, configuration, and era

- North American XSN2J
- Beechcraft T-34 Mentor
- Temco T-35 Buckaroo

Related lists

- List of military aircraft of the United States
- List of United States Navy aircraft designations (pre-1962)
