= Temco T-35 Buckaroo =

American low-cost trainer

T-35 Buckaroo / TE-1
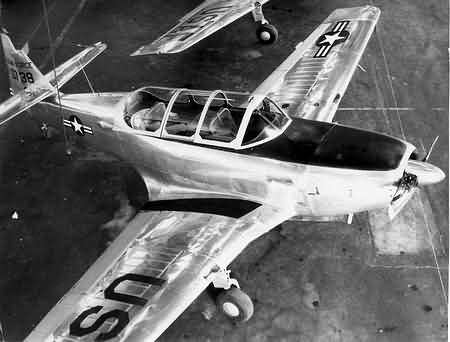
- The first YT-35 for evaluation by the USAF

General information
- Type: trainer
- National origin: United States
- Manufacturer: Temco Aircraft
- Primary user: Saudi Arabia
- Number built: 26

History
- Introduction date: 1948
- First flight: 1948, (TE-1B: 20 February 1950)
- Developed from: Globe Swift

The Temco T-35 Buckaroo (company designation TE-1) is an American trainer aircraft built by Temco Aircraft. The aircraft was designed in the late 1940s as an extremely low-cost trainer for commercial and military markets. Temco's failure to secure a United States Air Force order for the Buckaroo forced it to turn to non-U.S. governments to keep the production lines going, yet only a few export orders materialized.

== Design and development ==
Early in 1948, Temco's president, Robert McCulloch, received an inquiry from the Philippine Government expressing an interest in a tandem trainer version of the Swift. The first TE-1A was a modification of the Swift GC-1B, hand-built to rough layout drawings, the major difference in appearance being the tandem seating arrangement which resulted in a narrow windshield and an elongated two-piece canopy with a fixed bubble at the rear. This TE-1A prototype was completed late in 1948. After initial flight tests a 145 hp (108 kW) Continental engine replaced the original 125 hp (93 kW) installation.

Early in 1949, Temco's management received word that the United States Air Force (USAF) planned to hold a competition for a new primary/basic trainer. Temco built two additional prototypes for this competition, adding some minor improvements as time permitted. The three aircraft were designated the YT-35 by the Air Force. Temco was competing with two other training aircraft, namely the Fairchild XNQ-1/T-31 and the Beechcraft Model 45. On 24 February 1949, the Air Force trainer evaluation board chose the Beech Model 45 by a four-to-one vote with Temco's TE-1A a distant third. Due to budget cuts, the USAF program was ultimately cancelled that year.

Although the USAF had decided against the TE-1A, interest had increased on the part of foreign governments, particularly the Republic of the Philippines. After a study of the competition evaluation, Temco decided to proceed with a program to improve the TE-1A. Some of the redesign included:

1. A 3-inch (8 cm) increase in the overall length of fuselage and a change in its cross section to be more compatible with the tandem seating.
2. The horizontal tail was raised 9 inches (23 cm).
3. Wing and fuselage fillets were added.
4. Improved landing gear with main gear relocation to improve ground handling characteristics.
5. Structural improvement in the wing to meet 9 G loading.
6. Equipment and equipment installation changes were made including a change from a 12-volt to a 24-volt electrical system and radio installation changes to meet Air Force standards.

Concurrent with all this redesign, Temco had decided to build, on speculation, 10 of these production models powered by 145 hp (108 kW) engines.

== Operational history ==
Late in 1949 with the engineering and tooling about 75% complete, three of the TE-1As redesigned YT-35 were entered in the revived USAF trainer competition commencing in 1950. An evaluation program using students flying competing aircraft would be held at Randolph Air Force Base. Following receipt of the USAF order, Temco decided that in addition to the extensive changes that had been made to the TE-1A, a 165 hp (123 kW) Franklin engine would be installed. The USAF agreed to the change, with this model designated the TE-1B and given the name “Buckaroo”. Development of the TE-1A and the TE-1B continued concurrently. The TE-1A was designated for export, and the TE-1B was for the USAF. One TE-1A was bought by the Israeli Air Force and a second one was bought by the Greek Air Force.

In July 1950, the three YT-35 Buckaroos were delivered to Randolph AFB to compete with the YT-34 Mentor, the Fairchild T-31, Boulton Paul Balliol, and the de Havilland DHC-1B Chipmunk trainers. Later in 1950, the Korean War disrupted many U.S. military programs, including the YT-35 evaluation. The aircraft ended up at James Connally Air Force Base, now called TSTC Waco Airport near Waco, Texas.

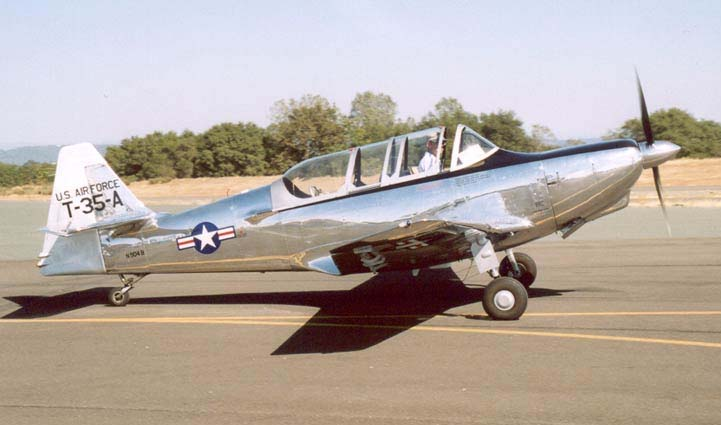
1950 Temco T-35A, N904B (Manufacturer's Serial number: 6005) is privately owned.

After 10 months of rigorous testing, the three YT-35s were returned to Temco in late July 1951, for factory overhaul. They then were assigned to Goodfellow Air Force Base where later all three were sold as surplus.

The majority of the TE-1Bs were sold to Saudi Arabia (designated T-35A) through the USAF under the Mutual Defense Aid Program. Temco's contract with the Saudis called for ten T-35A aircraft and enough spares to keep them flying for years. The Saudi Arabian T-35A aircraft included two 30-caliber machine guns, one mounted inside each wing and ten 2.75-inch rockets, five mounted under each wing.

Both Italy and Israel bought a single TE-1B Buckaroo in 1948. In 1950, the Israeli aircraft was evaluated against the Fokker Instructor and the DHC-1 Chipmunk for possible use as a trainer with the IAF flight school. Losing the competition, the single Buckaroo was retired in late 1950 or early 1951.

== Variants ==
Model TE-1A
Company designation for the Franklin 6A4-165-B3 engined version, six built (including three as YT-35).
Model TE-1B
Company designation for the Continental C-145-2H engined version, ten built as the T-35A.
YT-35
Model TE-1A with Franklin 6A4-165-B3 engine for evaluation by the United States Air Force, three built.
T-35A
Model TE-1B delivered to Saudi Arabia under Mutual Defense Aid Program, ten built.

== Operators ==
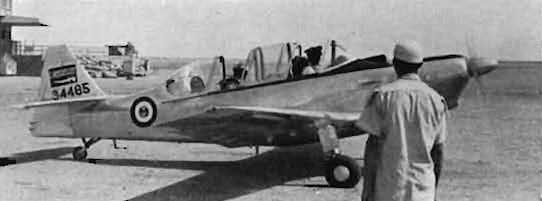
T-35A in Royal Saudi Air Force service

Greece

- Greek Air Force – One aircraft only.

Israel

- Israeli Air Force – One TE-1A for evaluation

Italy

- Italian Air Force – One TE-1A only received in 1950

Saudi Arabia

- Royal Saudi Air Force – Ten T-35A

United States

- United States Air Force – Three YT-35s for evaluation

== Surviving aircraft ==
One T-35A is on display in Riyadh, Saudi Arabia. Two T-35As recovered from a Saudi desert "boneyard" are owned by The International Swift Association in Athens, Tennessee, USA. Currently five Buckaroos are registered in the United States.

== Specifications (Temco Buckaroo TE-1B) ==
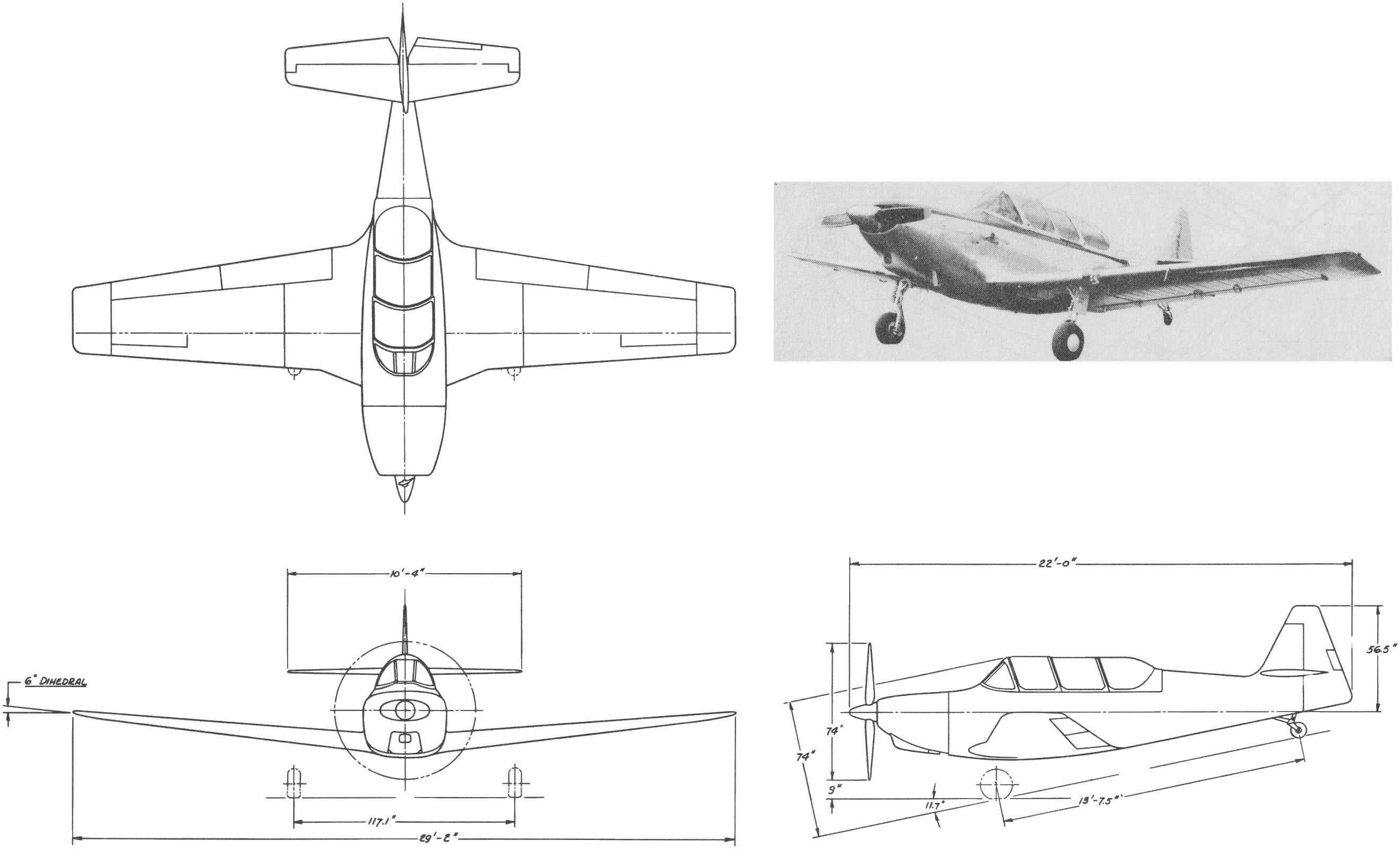
3-view drawing of the Temco YT-35 Buckaroo

Data from Jane's All The World's Aircraft 1953–54

General characteristics

- Crew: 2
- Length: 21 ft 8 in (6.60 m)
- Wingspan: 29 ft 4 in (8.94 m)
- Height: 6 ft 1 1/2 in (1.867 m)
- Wing area: 134 sq ft (12.4 m^{2})
- Airfoil: NACA 23015 (root), NACA 23009 (tip)
- Empty weight: 1,300 lb (590 kg)
- Gross weight: 1,920 lb (871 kg)
- Fuel capacity: 32.5 US gal (27.1 imp gal; 123 L)
- Powerplant: 1 × Franklin 6A4-165-B3 6-cylinder air-cooled horizontally opposed engine, 165 hp (123 kW)

Performance

- Maximum speed: 156 mph (251 km/h, 136 kn) at sea level
- Range: 548 mi (882 km, 476 nmi)
- Service ceiling: 17,000 ft (5,200 m)
- Rate of climb: 1,000 ft/min (5.1 m/s)
- Time to altitude: 32.7 min to 12,000 ft (3,700 m)

Armament

- Guns: 2× .30 in (7.62 mm) machine guns in wings
- Rockets: Racks for ten 2.75 in (70 mm) rockets

== See also ==
Aircraft of comparable role, configuration, and era

- Beechcraft T-34 Mentor
- de Havilland DHC-1B Chipmunk
- Fairchild XNQ

Related lists

- List of military aircraft of the United States
