= Temco Aircraft =

Aerospace manufacturer

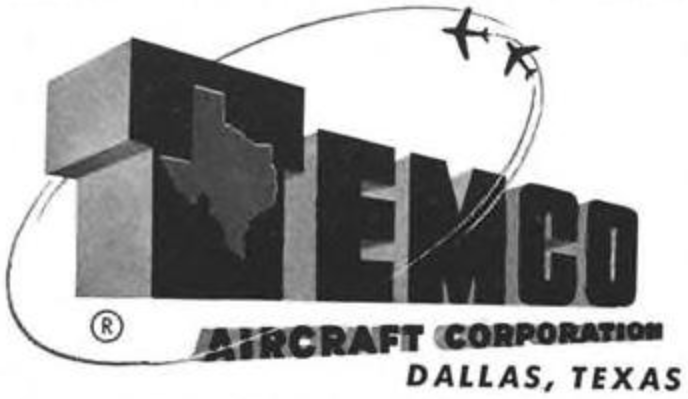

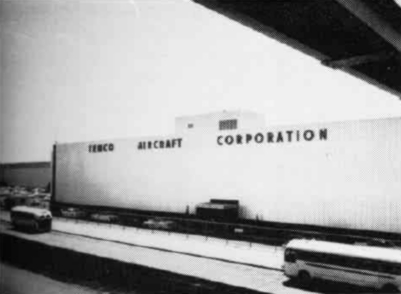
- The Temco plant at Dallas in the late 1950s
- Formerly: Texas Engineering & Manufacturing Company
- Industry: Aerospace
- Founded: 1946
- Founders: H. L "Bert" Howard; Robert McCulloch
- Defunct: 1960
- Fate: Merged
- Successor: Ling-Temco-Vought
- Headquarters: Dallas, Texas, United States

The Texas Engineering & Manufacturing Company (TEMCO), also known as Temco Aircraft Corporation, was a U.S.-based manufacturing company located in Dallas, Texas, USA. It is best known for eventually forming part of the conglomerate Ling-Temco-Vought.

== History ==
=== Company formation ===
Temco was the brainchild of Robert McCulloch, who began his career in aircraft with the Aircraft Division of William Beardmore and Company in Scotland. McCulloch emigrated to the US in 1927 and worked for a small machining company before joining the Atlantic Aircraft Corporation. The company was "flipped" a number of times during the Great Depression, first becoming Fokker Aircraft of America, then General Aviation, and finally North American Aviation (NAA), where McCulloch rose to become factory manager in 1941. That year he took a position at Convair as the general manager of their factory in Nashville, Tennessee, but he returned to NAA in 1943 and by the end of World War II was the manager of their new plant in the Dallas area at Grand Prairie.

With the end of the war Convair closed their Dallas plant, McCulloch joined with another NAA executive, H. L "Bert" Howard, to form the Texas Engineering and Manufacturing Corporation, later shortened to TEMCO, and reorganized as the TEMCO Aircraft Corporation in 1952. McCulloch was the president and general manager, while Howard was executive vice president and treasurer. Other members of the initial management team included: Al V. Graff, general superintendent; Clyde Williams, secretary & assistant treasurer; Joseph H. Baylis, industrial relations; Howard Jones, plant engineering, Ted H. Beck, aircraft engineering; Charles D. Collier, purchasing; John A. Maxwell, Jr., manufacturing control; Robert Yonash, production engineering; J. D. McKelvain, inspection; Otto Witbeck, shop superintendent; and O. A. Berthiaume, shop superintendent. All of the initial management team were former NAA employees.

Their idea was to keep the plant open and try to find contract work with other aviation firms on a "rental" basis. Bankers were unimpressed with the plan, but they eventually secured financing from several sources, notably Col. D. Harold Byrd who would later serve with the company.

=== General Products Division ===
In addition to aircraft manufacturing, described below, TEMCO also produced many other products, mostly under contract to other companies. These included:

- Coin-operated "serve yourself" popcorn vending machine for the T. & C. Company
- Venetian blind clips
- Mailboxes

This division also assembled a tractor for the Intercontinental Manufacturing Company (IMCO)

=== Aircraft manufacturing ===
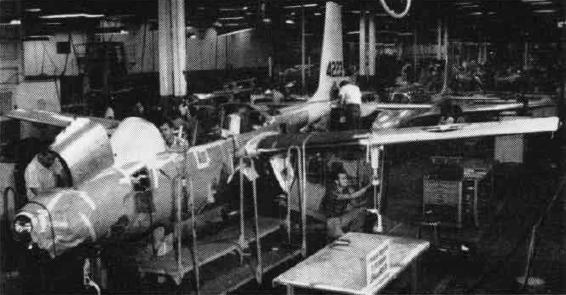
Assembly of U.S. Navy Temco TT-1 Pinto trainers at Temco Aircraft in Dallas, Texas, 1957.

The company secured contracts for various parts for major aircraft designs, including the C-82, Fairchild F-28, Lockheed F-104 Starfighter and P2V Neptune, the McDonnell F-101 Voodoo, the Boeing B-47 Stratojet, and many others. Additionally they started subcontracting production of the Globe Swift two seat general aviation design, but were so successful in production that supply soon caught up with demand and Globe went out of business. TEMCO retained the rights to the design in 1947, producing it in small numbers for the next four years. Equipping the Swift with a much more powerful engine and tandem two-seat cockpit turned it into the T-35 Buckaroo trainer aircraft, which competed and lost out to the Beechcraft T-34 Mentor. Ten T-35's were eventually sold to Saudi Arabia. Another new-design was also produced as the Model 33 Plebe, which also failed to enter production.

Work soon flooded the original Grand Prairie site, and a new plant was set up at Majors Field in Greenville, primarily to offload US Air Force work and allow Grand Prairie to be used primarily for Navy work. TEMCO, meanwhile, turned increasingly to overhaul services at their new Greenville plants, and won a contract to overhaul C-54's returning from the Berlin Airlift. TEMCO also acquired the Luscombe Aircraft, another Dallas-area company involved in similar work. In 1953 they became involved in a partnership with Riley Aircraft Sales to convert existing North American Navions to a twin-engine version, the Twin Navion, eventually buying the rights to the conversion and converting 138 aircraft over the next four years. However, by 1954 contracts were drying up, and the company was down to only 500 employees, laying off over 2,000 in a town of only 15,000.

TEMCO increasingly turned to aviation electronics and missile guidance systems. In 1955 they won a contract to produce "quick reaction kits" for the Air Force's B-29 Superfortress fleet, and employment started increasing again. In 1955 they won a similar contract for the B-50, and by the end of the next year were up to 1,700 employees. By 1958 electronics was providing half of the company's income, but they continued to win overhaul contracts, including the C-121 and C-97. They also designed a light attack aircraft based on the earlier Model 33, the new Model 58 but this failed to find any buyers. In 1952 they started work on what would become the Model 51 Pinto, competing with an Air Force contract that was eventually won by the Cessna T-37. Fourteen were eventually taken on by the Navy in 1956, who flew them as the TT-1. Several of these eventually worked their way into civilian hands, where they were converted with the J85 engine and known as the Super Pinto. From 1957 to 1960, Temco developed the ASM-N-8 Corvus anti-radiation missile for the U.S. Navy. The project was cancelled in 1960, when the program was taken over by the U.S. Air Force.

=== Formation of Ling-Temco-Vought ===
By 1960 electronics was their major product, and the company merged with another Dallas-area electronics firm, Ling-Altec, itself recently formed in a merger of Ling Electronics and Altec. Together the two firms raised capital from various sources, and in 1961 formed a merger with Chance Vought, who had moved to the area in 1948, to become Ling-Temco-Vought, or LTV. McCulloch served as chairman of the board and chief executive officer. He remained as chairman of the board and later chairman of the executive committee until his retirement in April 1970.

=== Subsequent companies ===
Through the 1970s LTV started divesting itself of its aviation holdings. The former Temco Aircraft electronics plant at Greenville, by then known as LTV Electrosystems, became E-Systems, eventually being purchased by Raytheon, and today is a part of L3Harris.

== Products ==
=== Aircraft ===
Model name	First flight	Number built	Type
Temco F-24		280	Single engine utility airplane
Temco T-35 Buckaroo	1948	26	Single engine trainer
Temco D-16	1952	110	Twin engine conversion of Ryan Navion
Temco 33 Plebe	1953	1	Single engine trainer
Temco 58	1956	1	Single engine trainer
Temco TT Pinto	1956	15	Single engine jet trainer
Temco XKDT Teal	1957		Target drone

=== Missiles ===
- ASM-N-8 Corvus
