= I40 =

I40 or I-40 may refer to:

- HMS Georgetown (I40), a destroyer of the Royal Navy
- Hyundai i40, a car
- Interstate 40, a highway in the United States
- Japanese submarine I-40
- Richard Downing Airport, near Coshocton, Ohio
- TRAPPIST, an astronomical observatory in Chile
