= Ryan Navion =

American light aircraft design

Navion
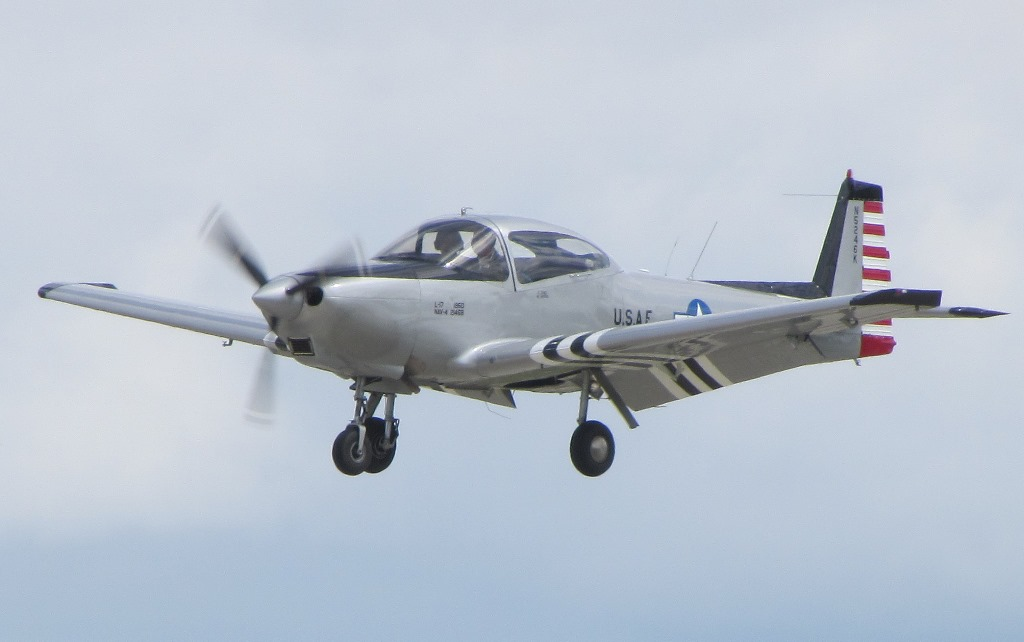
- 1950 Ryan Navion B

General information
- Type: Light fixed-wing aircraft
- Manufacturer: North American Aviation; Ryan Aeronautical; Tusco Corp.
- Status: Active
- Primary users: United States Air Force United States Army; Uruguayan Air Force
- Number built: 2,634

History
- Introduction date: 1948
- Variants: Camair Twin Navion; Temco D-16

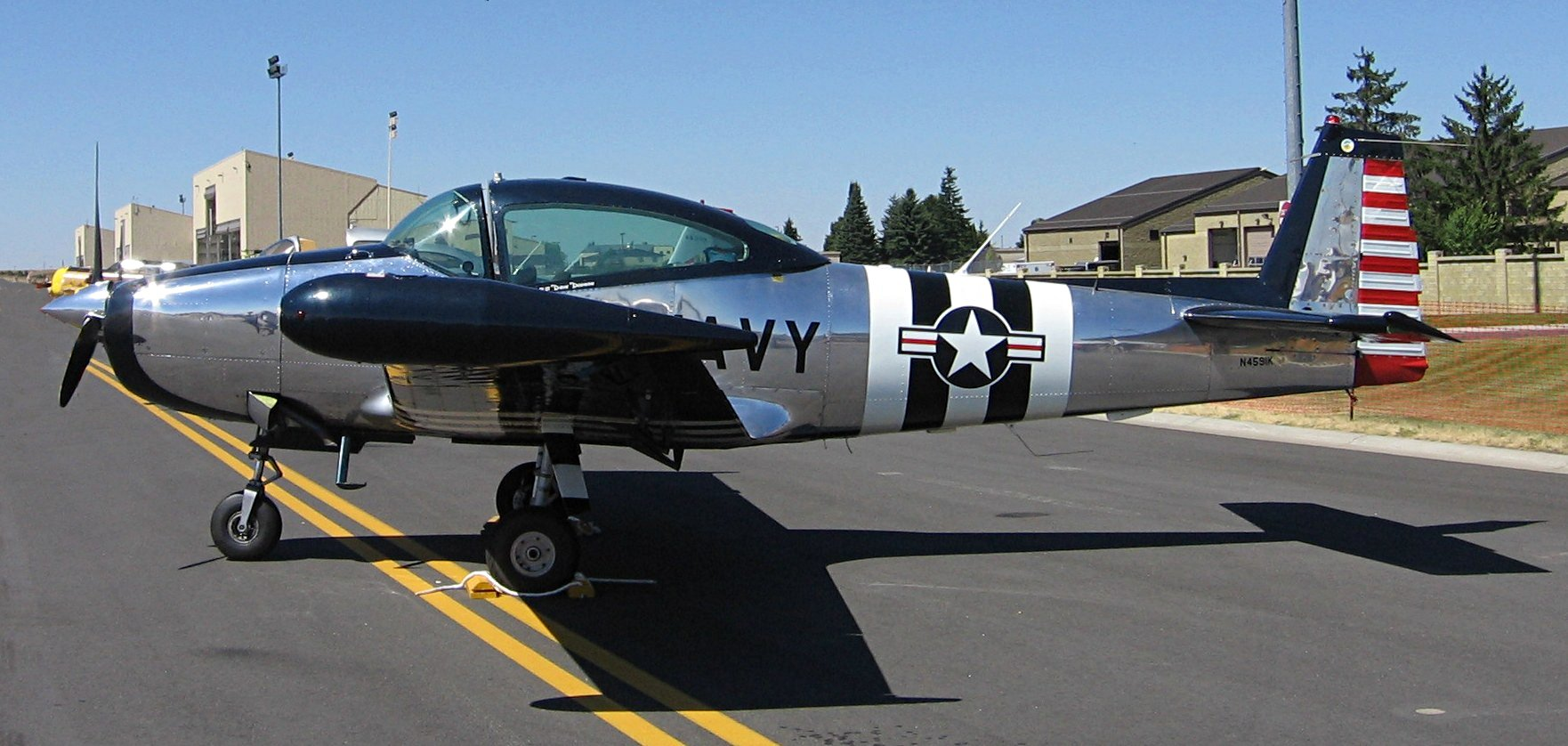
Navion with a Continental IO-520 engine.

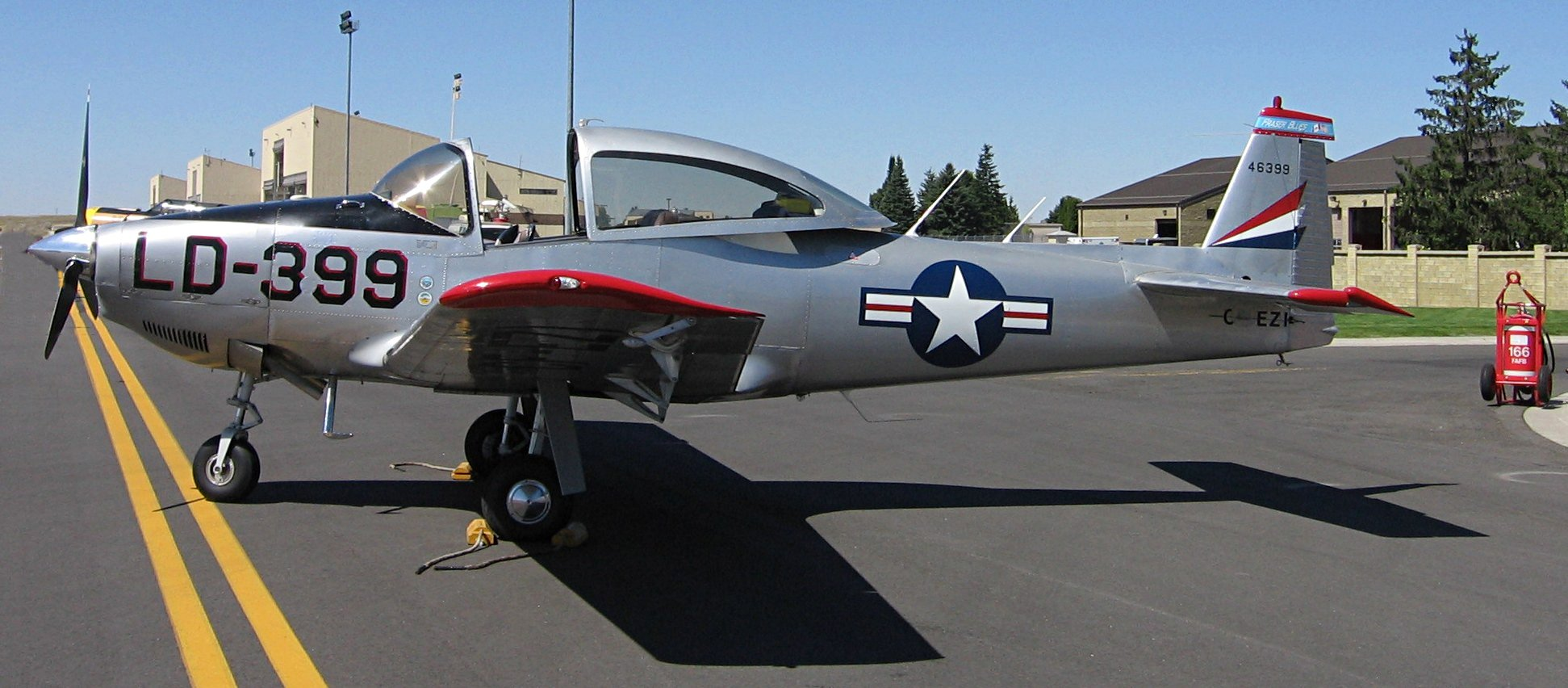
Navion with canopy opened

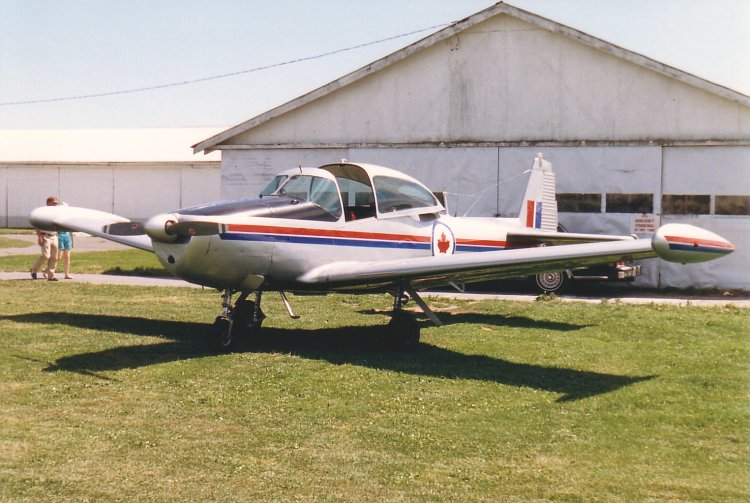
Ryan Navion at Delta Air Park 1988

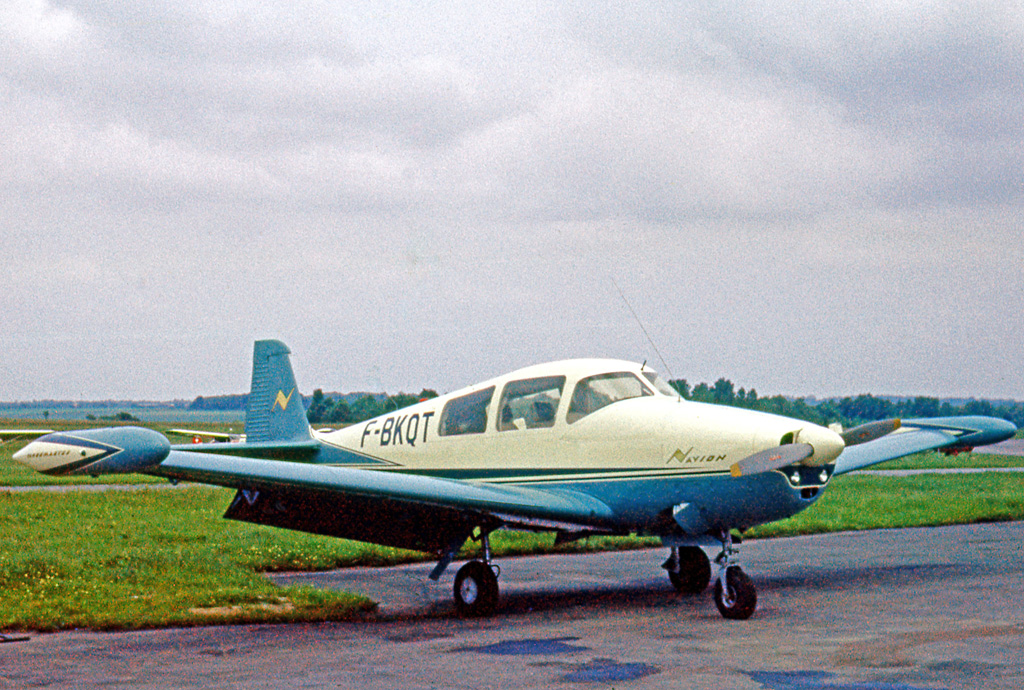
Navion G Rangemaster registered in France with modified fin and other enhancements

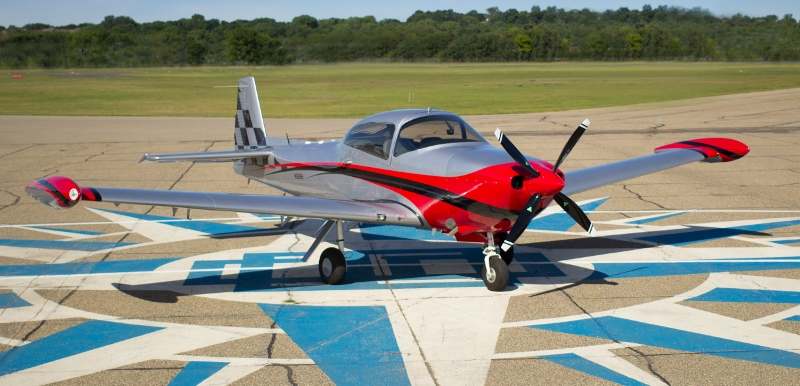
A factory restored 1947 North American Navion

The Ryan (originally North American) Navion is a single-engine, unpressurized, retractable gear, four-seat aircraft originally designed and built by North American Aviation in the 1940s. It was later built by Ryan Aeronautical Company and the Tubular Steel Corporation (TUSCO).

The Navion was envisioned as an aircraft that would perfectly match the expected postwar boom in civilian aviation. It was designed along the general lines of, and by the same company which produced the North American P-51 Mustang, and North American T-28 Trojan.

== Design and development ==
The Navion was originally designed at the end of World War II by North American Aviation as the NA-143 (but produced under the NA-145 designation). North American built 1,109 Navions in 1946–47, initially selling them at a below cost US$3,995, which later increased to $6,100, although the actual cost of construction was $9,000. These included 83 L-17As for the US Army and National Guard.

Ryan Aeronautical Company acquired the design in the summer of 1947, launching production at its San Diego factory in 1948. Ryan built 1,240 Navions (powered by 205 hp (153 kW) Continental O-470 engines or 250 hp (190 kW) Lycoming O-435 engines), including 163 aircraft for the US armed forces, before production ended in 1951, with Ryan wanting to concentrate on defense production.

Production rights passed to the TUSCO corporation, which flew a prototype of a revised version, the Navion Rangemaster G, on 10 June 1960, and set up the Navion Aircraft Company to build it. The Rangemaster G replaced the sliding canopy of the earlier Navions with a more conventional five seat cabin with access via car-type doors. Production began in 1961, and by mid-1962 was reported to be at a rate of 20 per month, but Navion Aircraft Company went bankrupt, and the rights to the Navion were picked up by the Navion Aircraft Corporation, set up by members of the American Navion Society in mid-1965. The rights were then purchased by the Janox Corporation, who held a groundbreaking for a new factory at Richard Downing Airport in Coshocton, Ohio in October 1970. However, no production every materialized there. The design was acquired by the Navion Rangemaster Aircraft Corporation in Wharton, Texas in 1972 and a few aircraft were built before the company went bankrupt in 1976. Later, in 1997, the Navion Aircraft Company proposed building a service center at the Wood County Airport in Bowling Green, Ohio.

== Operational history ==
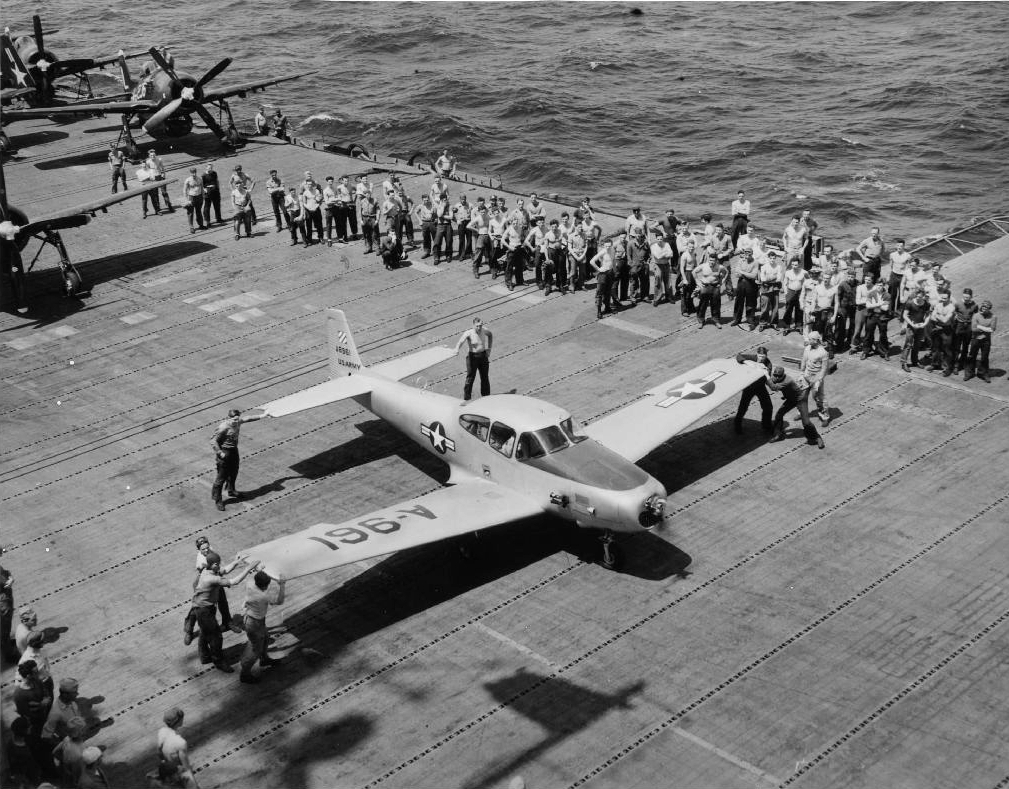
Ryan L-17B Navion on USS Leyte (CV-32), 1950.

While Republic offered an amphibious aircraft, the Seabee, Cessna offered the 195, and Beechcraft offered by far the most successful type Bonanza, which remains in production in 2020. All of these aircraft, including the Navion were significantly more advanced than prewar civilian aircraft and they set the stage for aircraft built from aluminum sheets riveted to aluminum formers. It was thought that wartime pilots would come home and continue flying with their families and friends under more peaceful conditions, but the postwar boom in civilian aviation did not materialize to the extent the manufacturers envisioned.

The United States Army Air Force bought 83 L-17As from North American in 1946, as a liaison and staff transport aircraft, with 36 going to the Army and 47 to the National Guard. These were supplemented by 163 L-17Bs from 1948, which were ordered by the United States Air Force on behalf of the Army and National Guard, with 129 going to the Army and the rest to the National Guard. During the Korean War, the US Army's Navions added casualty evacuation and forward air controller to the aircraft's liaison and light transport duties. The Navion was phased out of front line service by 1957, with the aircraft handed over to the Civil Air Patrol or used as hacks.

=== Present day ===
As of 2010, many Navions are still flying and there is an active Navion owners community. On 18 March 2003 Sierra Hotel Aero Inc of South St. Paul, Minnesota purchased the type certificate, design data, molds and tooling. The company stated in January 2013 that it was two to three years away from bringing the aircraft back into production. In the meantime Sierra Hotel Aero is carrying out re-manufacturing and upgrading for some owners of Navions.

== Variants ==
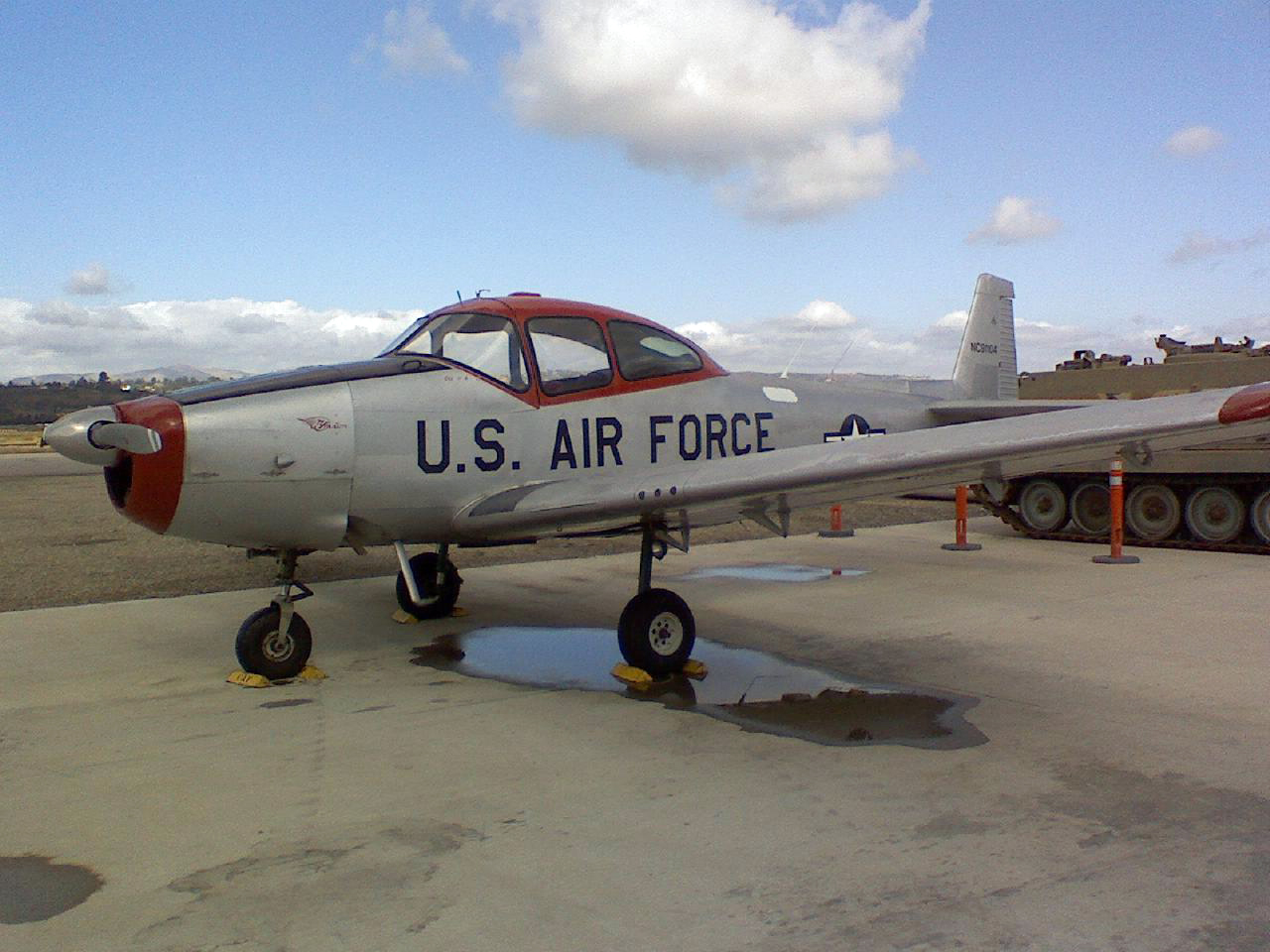
North American L-17A, flown by the Commemorative Air Force, Camarillo Airport

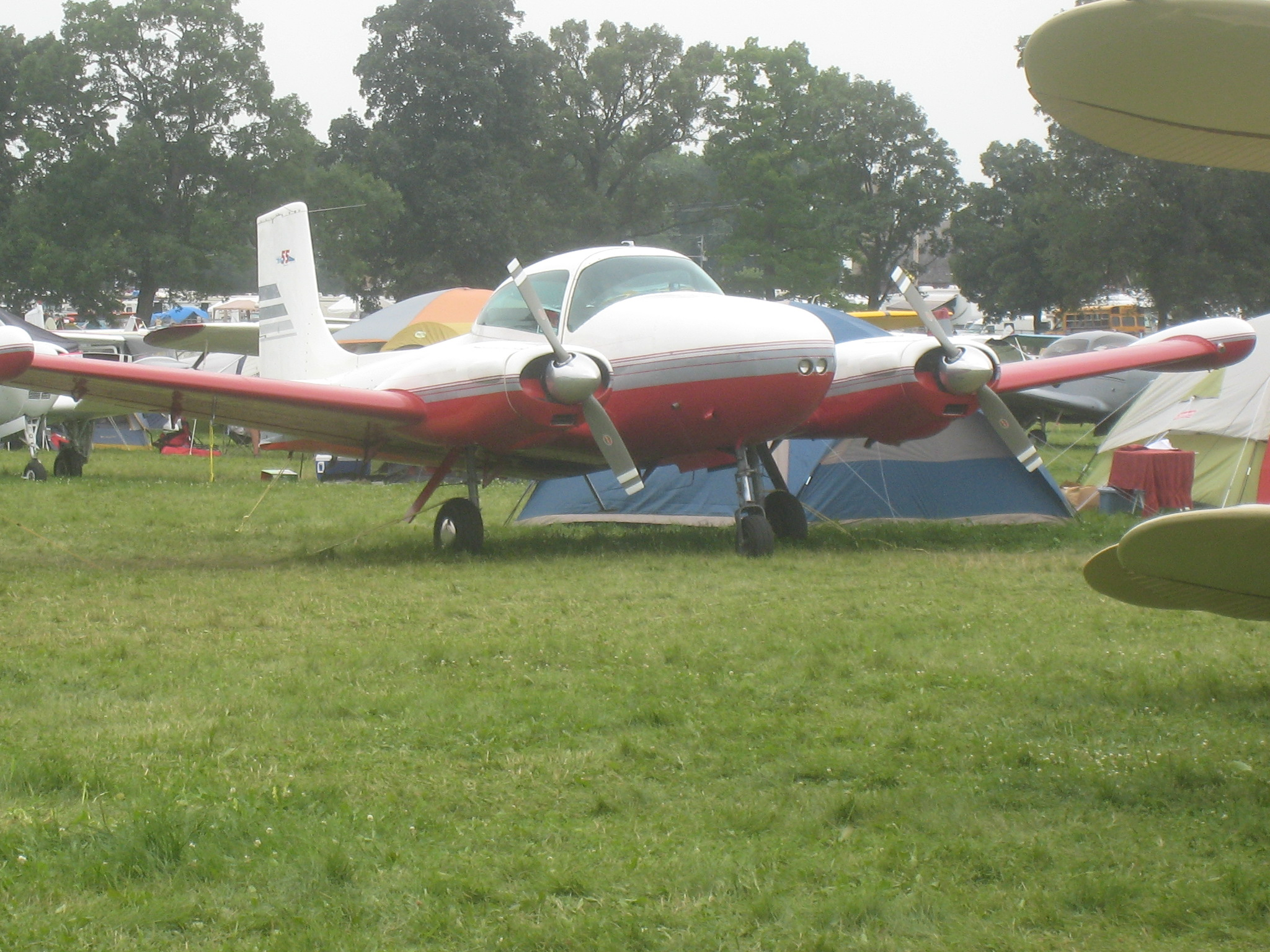
A twin Navion conversion

North American NA-143
Two prototypes.
North American NA-145 Navion
North-American-built production aircraft, 1,027 built.
North American NA-154 Navion
Military version for the United States Army as the L-17A, 83 built.
Ryan Navion
Ryan-built production aircraft, 600 built.

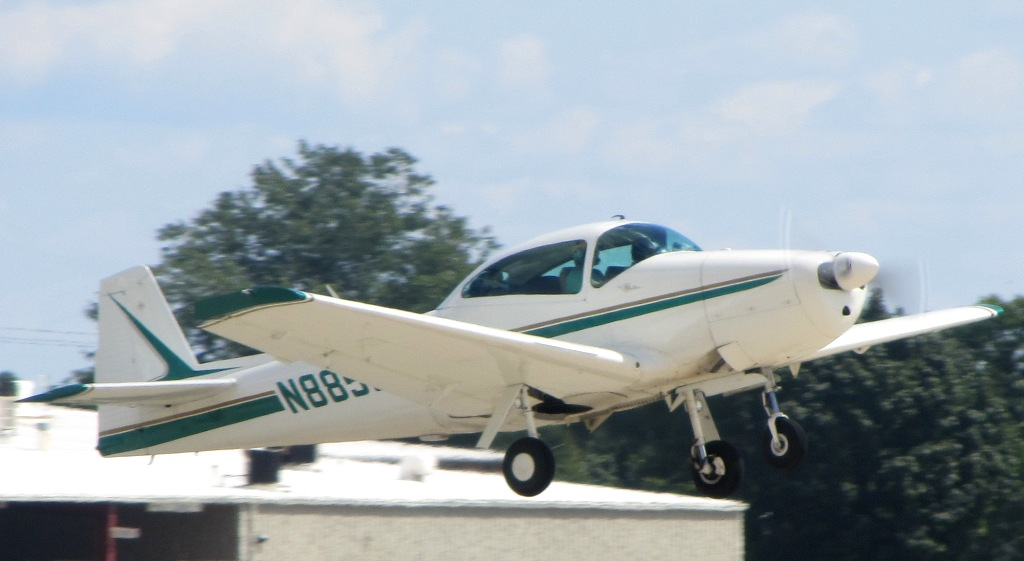
1947 Navion A

Ryan Navion A
Improved Navion with a 205hp Continental E-185-9 engine, 602 built.
Ryan Navion B
Modified for the higher powered 260hp Lycoming GO-435-C2 engine, also known as the Super Navion 260, 222 built.
Tusco Navion D
Conversion by Tulsa Manufacturing Company with a 240hp Continental IO-470-P engine and tip tanks.
Tusco Navion E
Conversion Tulsa Manufacturing Company with a 250hp Continental IO-470-C engine and tip tanks.
Tusco Navion F
Conversion Tulsa Manufacturing Company with a 260hp Continental IO-470-H engine and tip tanks.
Navion G Rangemaster
Redesigned aircraft by Navion Aircraft Company with 260hp Continental IO-470H engine, integral cabin and tip tanks, 121, some built as the Rangemaster G-1 with a modified fin.
Navion H Rangemaster
Navion G with a 285hp Continental IO-520B engine, 60 built, an additional aircraft was built by the Navion Rangemaster Aircraft Company in 1974.
Klingler Navion J Rangemaster
Proposal for a Navion with a TIO-540-J2BD engine, six-seats and an extended cabin
Klingler Navion K
Proposal for a Navion with a TIO-540-J2BD engine, six seats and a sliding canopy
Ryan Model 72
One Navion B was modified as two-seat trainer for a United States Navy competition with the Temco Model 33 Plebe.

Camair Twin Navion
twin engine conversion Camair 480, 2 Continental O-470-B, 240 hp each. Camair 480C, 2 Continental IO-470- 260 hp each. 25+- built.
X-16 Bi-Navion
One twin-engined (130hp Lycomings) prototype designed and built by Dauby Equipment Company in 1952, production by Riley and later by Temco.
Temco Riley 55
Initial version of the twin engined Navion conversion.
D-16 Twin Navion
Production version of the X-16 with two 150hp Lycoming O-320 engines and strengthened wings, 19 conversions by Riley and 46 by Temco.
Temco D-16A
Improved D-16 conversion with two 170hp Lycoming O-340-A1A engines, nacelle tanks and 20 gallon each tip tanks, 144 gallons fuel total. 45 conversions.

=== Military ===
L-17A
Military designation for NA-154s delivered to the United States Army, 83 built, re-designated U-18A in 1962.
QL-17A
Six L-17As modified by TEMCO as remote-controlled drones for the United States Air Force.
L-17B
Military designation for Ryan-built Navion As delivered to the U.S.Army, 163 built, re-designated U-18B in 1962.
L-17C
L-17As modified by Ryan with improved brakes and increased fuel capacity, 35 modified, re-designated U-18C in 1962.
XL-17D
Three former XL-22As for evaluation.
XL-22A
Two Ryan-built Navion Bs for the U.S.Army, re-designated XL-17D.
U-18A
Former L-17As re-designated in 1962.
U-18B
Former L-17Bs re-designated in 1962.
U-18C
Former L-17Cs re-designated in 1962.

== Operators ==
=== Civil ===
The Navion is popular with private individuals and companies.

=== Military ===
Greece

- Royal Hellenic Air Force

United States

- United States Air Force
- United States Army
- Air National Guard
  - Massachusetts Air National Guard

Uruguay

- Uruguayan Air Force, 5 L-17B (1949 – 1975)

== Specifications (Super 260 Navion) ==
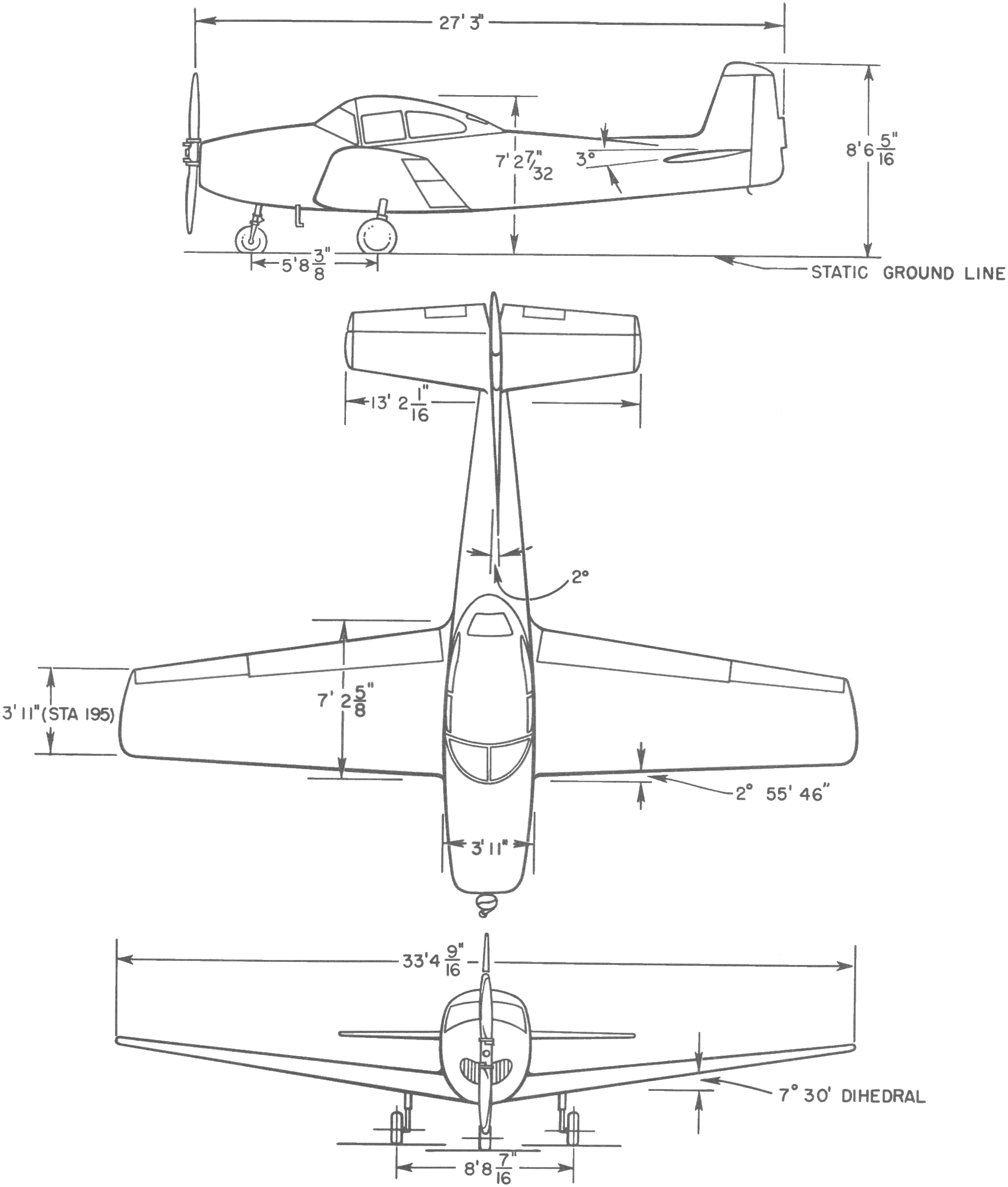
3-view line drawing of the Ryan L-17

Data from Jane's All The World's Aircraft 1951–52

General characteristics

- Crew: 1
- Capacity: 3 passengers
- Length: 27 ft 6 in (8.38 m)
- Wingspan: 33 ft 5 in (10.19 m)
- Height: 8 ft 8 in (2.64 m)
- Wing area: 184 sq ft (17.1 m^{2})
- Empty weight: 1,930 lb (875 kg)
- Gross weight: 2,850 lb (1,293 kg)
- Fuel capacity: 40 US gal (33 imp gal; 150 L)
- Powerplant: 1 × Lycoming GO-435-C2 air-cooled flat-six engine, 260 hp (190 kW) (take-off power)

Performance

- Maximum speed: 174 mph (280 km/h, 151 kn)
- Cruise speed: 170 mph (270 km/h, 150 kn)
- Range: 595 mi (958 km, 517 nmi)
- Service ceiling: 18,000 ft (5,500 m)
- Rate of climb: 1,250 ft/min (6.4 m/s)
- Take-off run: 400 ft (120 m)
- Landing run: 468 ft (143 m)

== See also ==
Aircraft of comparable role, configuration, and era

- Beechcraft Bonanza
- Fuji FA-200 Aero Subaru
- Messerschmitt Bf 108 / Nord 1000 Pingouin
- Meyers 200
- Mooney M20
- Orlican L-40 Meta Sokol
- Piaggio P.149
- Piper Comanche

Related lists

- List of military aircraft of the United States
