= Arthur Hartman =

Arthur Hartman may refer to:

- Arthur A. Hartman (1926–2015), American diplomat
- Arthur J. Hartman (1888–1970), American pilot and early aircraft builder
