= Aviation in Iowa =

- Aviation in the United States
- Iowa State Flag

Airports
- Commercial – primary: 6
- Commercial – non-primary: 2
- General aviation: 68
- Other public-use airports: 45

First flight
- 1850 - Hot air balloon

Iowa's first aeronautical event was the flight of a balloon around 1850 by Professor Silas Brooks. Iowa's first powered flight was made by Art J. Hartman in his Iowa built, Hartman monoplane on 10 May 1910.

== Events ==
- On 13 October 1910 Thomas Scott Baldwin demonstrated the Baldwin Red Devil at the Iowa city fair.
- September 5, 1912, Lincoln Beachey delivers the first Iowa airmail letters.
- 19 July 1989, United Airlines Flight 232 DC-10 makes a crash landing with complete hydraulic failure at Sioux Gateway Airport.

== Aircraft Manufacturers ==
- Angel Aircraft Corporation, Orange City, Iowa Builds the AAC Angel pusher light twin.
- Grinnell Aeroplane Company (1914-1918) Grinnell, Iowa - Manufactured early biplanes.
- Central States Aero (1926-) was founded in Davenport, Iowa building an aircraft designed by Clayton Folkerts that would become the popular Monocoupe series.

== Aerospace ==
- Adams-Farwell, Dubuque, Iowa- An early automobile manufacturer developed radial engines used in early aircraft.

== Airports ==
- Des Moines International Airport is the busiest airport in Iowa with 898,840 passenger movements in 2010.
- List of Airports in Iowa

== Organizations ==
- The Iowa Aviation Promotion Group is a non-profit organization with a mission to promote aviation within Iowa

== Government and Military ==
- All flight operations in Iowa are conducted within FAA oversight.
- The Iowa State Patrol Air Wing was founded in 1956. It now operates 3 Cessna 182, 5 Cessna 172, and one Piper Saratoga.

== Museums ==
- Iowa Aviation Museum, located in Greenfield, Iowa
- Iowa Aviation Heritage Museum, Ankeny, Iowa
