= Billy Robinson (aviator) =

William C. Robinson
- Born: September 24, 1884; Redfield, South Dakota, U.S.
- Died: March 11, 1916 (aged 31); Grinnell, Iowa, U.S.
- Cause of death: Aircraft crash
- Resting place: Hazelwood Cemetery, Grinnell, Iowa

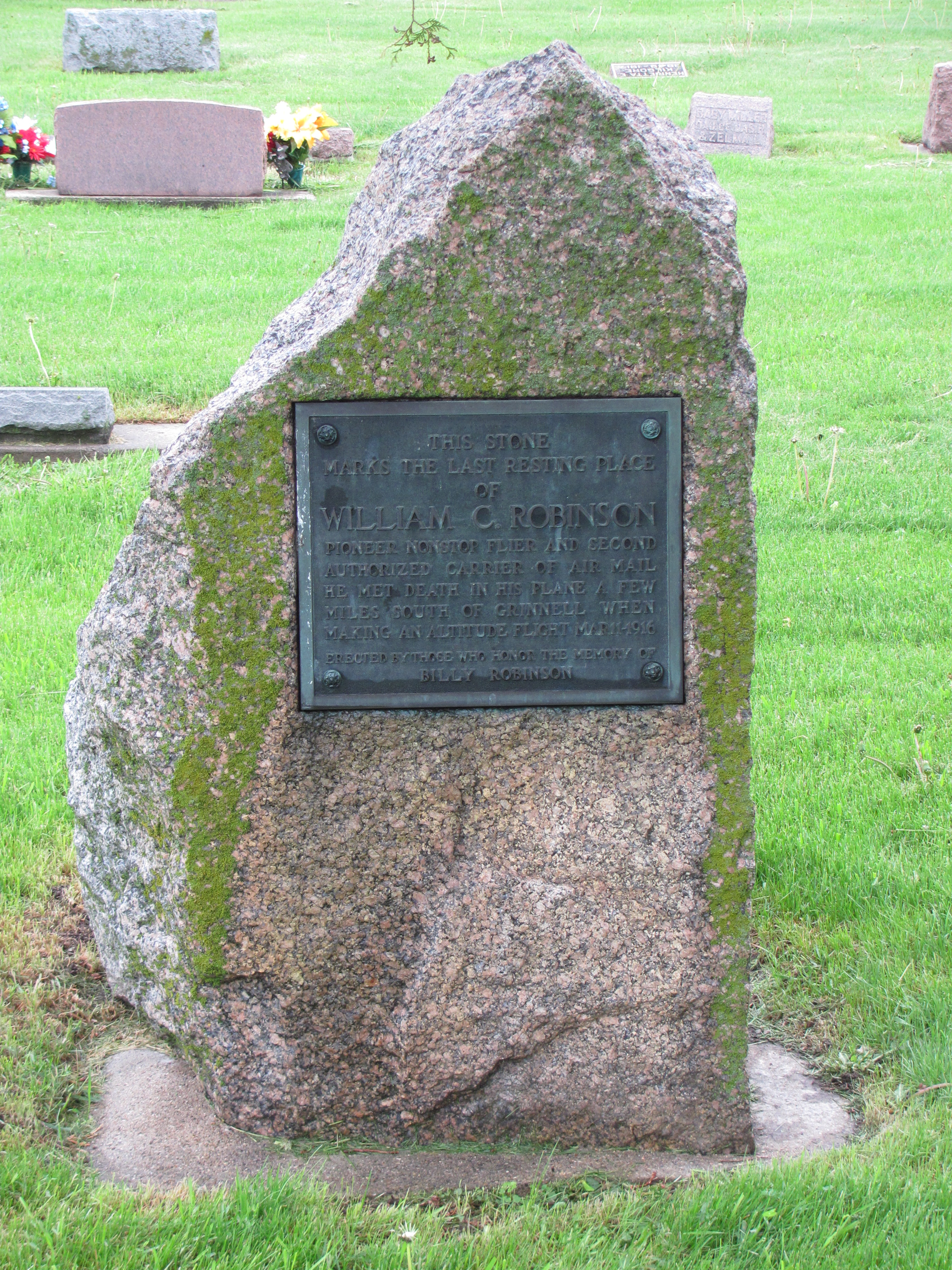
Gravestone of William C. Robinson in Hazelwood Cemetery in Grinnell, IA

William C. Robinson (September 24, 1884 – March 11, 1916) was an early American inventor and aviator.

== Biography ==
Robinson was born in Redfield, South Dakota, and moved to Grinnell, Iowa in 1896 at age 12. He was a handyman, tinkerer, and bicycle repairman who designed and built his own flying machine. In 1911, with the help of Charles Hink, Robinson constructed a 60 horsepower radial motor for his monoplane. His innovations for the radial motor were revolutionary. In 1914 he set a record for non-stop flight, carrying mail from Des Moines to Kentland, Indiana. Later he founded the Grinnell Aeroplane Company.

Robinson perished while flying his biplane, attempting to set an altitude record on March 11, 1916. His aircraft was witnessed climbing to altitude, before drifting down like a falling leaf, and gliding to a landing, which was controlled enough to leave skid marks, but rough enough to rupture the fuel tank and ignite the aircraft. Hypoxia was suspected among other reasons for the crash, but the fire made it impossible to verify the exact cause.

On June 18, 1988, the Grinnell Regional Airport was dedicated and named Billy Robinson Field.

== Archives ==
- Additional photos of Robinson and his planes can be found in Digital Grinnell, a digital archive of Grinnell local history materials maintained by Grinnell College.
