= Bay Super V =

Utility aircraft

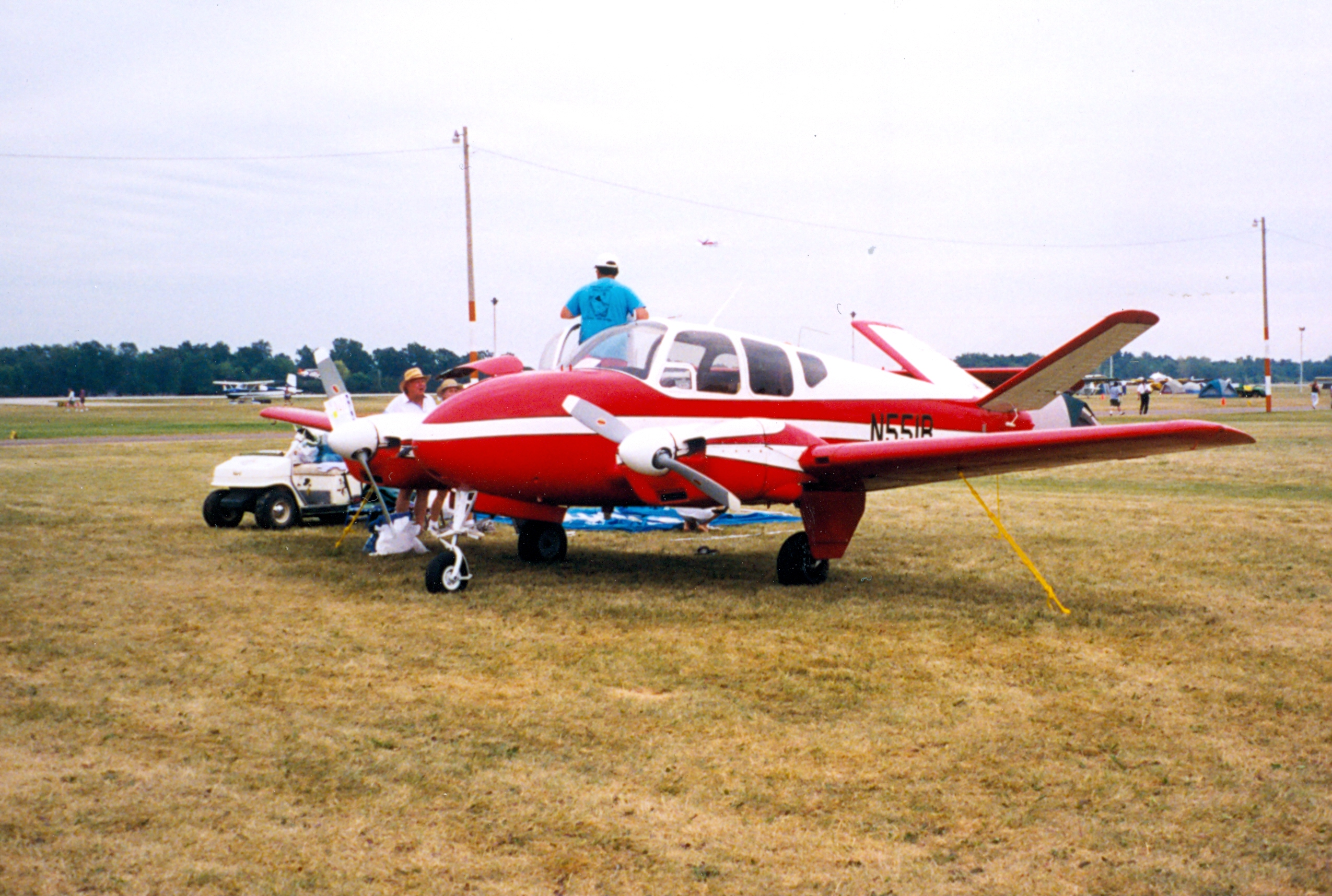
- A 1962 Bay Super V

General information
- Type: utility aircraft
- National origin: United States of America
- Manufacturer: Bay Aviation
- Designer: David G. Peterson
- Number built: 14

History
- Introduction date: 1960
- First flight: 1956
- Developed from: Beechcraft Bonanza

The Bay Super V, also known as the Super "V" Bonanza, was an American twin-piston-engined utility aircraft converted from the Beechcraft Model 35 Bonanza. Developed by David G. Peterson in 1955–6, it retained the Bonanza's V-tail but incorporated substantial structural modifications, which were extensive enough that the Federal Aviation Administration (FAA) issued the Super V a separate type certificate.

Oakland Airmotive acquired the rights to the conversion in 1958 and became Bay Aviation Services in 1960. Bay manufactured and installed Super V conversion kits on customer-supplied Bonanzas, completing nine aircraft. Production was transferred in 1962 to Fleet Aircraft in Canada, which produced five more under a separate type certificate, bringing total production to fourteen.

== History ==
=== Development ===
The Super-V is an extensive conversion of the Beechcraft Model 35 Bonanza. Serial number records indicate the aircraft chosen for conversion range in production dates from 1947 to 1950. The original conversion was developed by David Peterson as the "Skyline Super-V" in 1955–6, assisted by W.D. Johnson, and the rights to the conversion were acquired by Oakland Airmotive on July 2, 1958. Oakland Airmotive became Bay Aviation Services on July 8, 1960. The wing spar was strengthened considerably in the process. The airframe is so different from the original Bonanza that, rather than supplementing the original type certificate, the US Federal Aviation Administration (FAA) issued a completely new certificate for the Super-V.

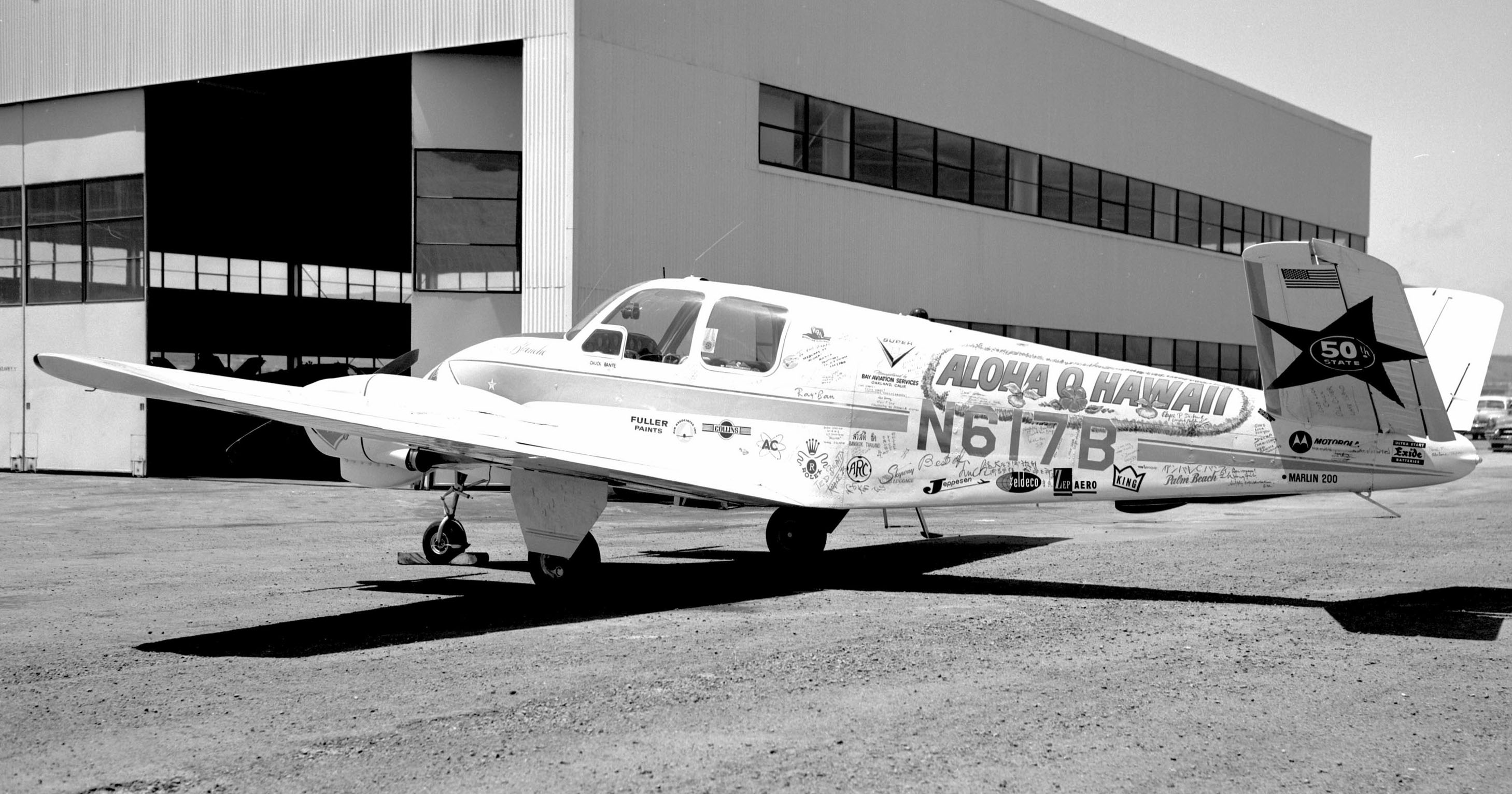
Rear view of the Super V used in a 1960 global circumnavigation by Chuck Banfe.

Oakland Airmotive intended to produce converted planes starting in 1960, but never progressed beyond manufacturing and installing Super-V conversion kits on customer-supplied Bonanzas. Ed Gough was the President. FAA type certification was granted in June 1960. Production drawings, bills of material, and other documentation was prepared and there were several conversions in the pipeline. Flying magazine published a story on the Super V in October 1960 and the marketing efforts were reaching a peak, with a Super-V (Registration N617B) completing a successful circumnavigation of the globe.

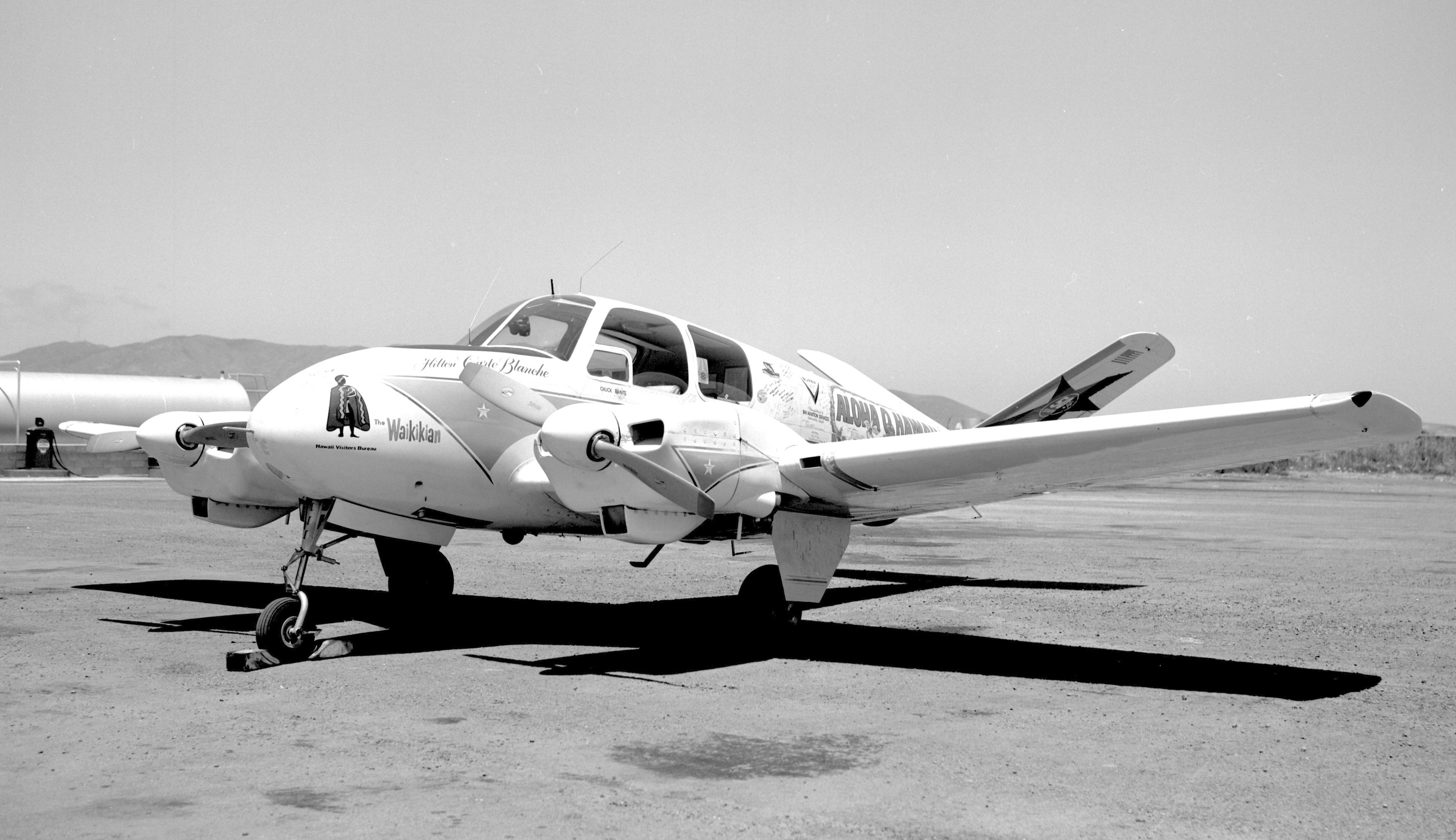
This Super-V was flown by Chuck Banfe around the world in 1960.

The cost of a standard conversion was priced in 1960 at US$22,500 (equivalent to $245,000 in 2025), not including the cost of the donor aircraft.

The Super-V was initially certificated with the carburetor-equipped Lycoming O-360-A1A engines. Although the engines were intended to be fuel-injected, as on David Peterson's developmental prototype, the engines on the prototype did not meet FAA approval. As a preliminary first step towards true fuel injection, the O-360-A1C engine was adopted in August 1960, which eliminated the possibility of carburetor icing. The type certificate was later revised to include the A1C engine variant, and flight testing with O-360-A1C engines was not completed until early 1961 at SFO.

The Insul-8 Corporation of San Carlos, California, organized a new aviation division that provided all parts (except engines) for the conversion to the Super-V Aircraft Corporation of San Francisco International Airport. Super-V conversion centers operated under franchise from the Super-V Aircraft Corporation. Tirey L. Ford, Jr., was president of both the Insul-8 Corporation and the Super-V Aircraft Corporation.

=== Early accidents ===
The sales manager, Kenneth Bellamy, was killed in a crash fifteen miles southeast of Brighton, Colorado, while demonstrating the Super V to a potential buyer, Don Vest, founder of Vest Aircraft Company on September 14, 1960. A crop-duster pilot, John Curry, was also killed in the crash. It was believed that Vest was at the controls of the Super-V at the time of the crash.

The Super-V belonging to Southland Corporation, a distributor for Bay Aviation Services, crashed on August 12, 1961, near Ardmore, Oklahoma, with at least one survivor.

=== Shifting production ===
It is likely the relatively high cost of the Super-V conversion and competition from the Beechcraft Travel Air, a factory-built twin-engine aircraft of comparable role and size, resulted in low demand for the Super-V. This, coupled with workmanship issues and early crashes, led to the rapid dissolution of Bay Aviation. Bay Aviation became Lawrence Properties in 1962.

Production was transferred to Fleet Aircraft in 1962 with some detail improvements to fulfill existing orders. A separate type certificate was issued for planes manufactured by Fleet in Canada, this time with O-360-A1D engines. The production rights were sold again to Mitchell Aircraft in 1963. The current type certificate holder is KWAD Company.

== Specific aircraft ==
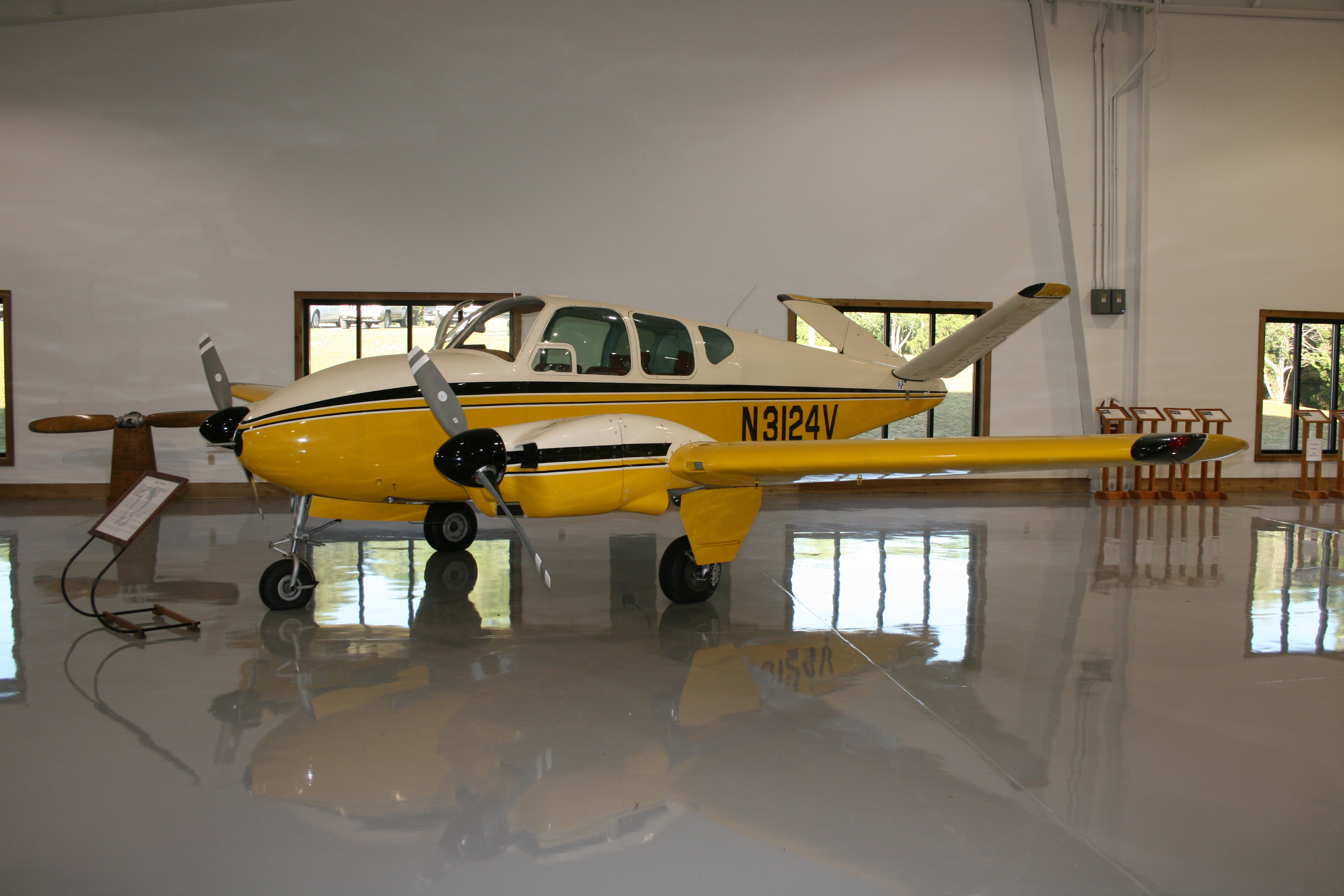
Pine Air Super V N3124V (SV109) at the Beechcraft Heritage Museum in Tullahoma, Tennessee

The complete Super-V serial number consists of the converted Super-V serial number (in the format SV###) accompanied by the Beech donor plane serial number (D####). Super-V serial numbers were assigned sequentially starting from SV101. Serial numbers as high as SV117 are known to exist; SV101 was later rebuilt into SV116, and SV110 and SV111 were skipped, hence known production is fourteen aircraft. Of the fourteen, nine were built by Bay Aviation (of which five have been destroyed, two still hold current registration, and two have unknown disposition) and five were built by Fleet Aircraft (of which two have been destroyed, one still holds current registration, and two have unknown disposition).

Bay Super V histories
Super-V S/N	Beech S/N	Built	Converted	Destroyed	Final Registration	Other Reg	Notes
SV101	D-1640	June 1948	January 1959	July 5, 1966	N617B		This plane model successfully circumnavigated the globe in 1960. Subsequently, rebuilt into SV116.
SV102	D-1982	1949		September 14, 1960	N8409A		Destroyed during a September 14, 1960 demonstration crash near Brighton, Colorado.
SV103	D-1249	1948		August 12, 1961	N4442V	NC4442V	Registered to Southland Aviation (a Bay Aviation distributor). It subsequently crashed on August 12, 1961, near Ardmore, Oklahoma. Both SV102 and SV103 were known to be lost by the time production shifted to Fleet/Canada in 1962.
SV104	D-1731	1948	July 1961	April 28, 1968	N104SV	N104S	Substantially damaged in a nonfatal April 28, 1968 accident in California during a wheels-up landing due to mechanical failure of the nose gear. Its FAA registration was cancelled in 2013.
SV105	D-1479	April 1948			N549B	NC462B, N57W	Damaged in a nonfatal April 11, 1964 accident in Maryland during a wheels-up landing due to pilot error. In 1965, registry number N549B was issued to airframe serial number D-1479. Prior to the destruction of the aircraft it was operated by James William Bullock, Astro Inc. (Aeronautical Sales, Training, and Research Organization). There is some confusion about this airframe since there is photographic evidence that N549B is a Bay Super V, but the FAA registry states N549B is an unmodified single-engine Bonanza.
SV106	D-1356	1948	March 1961		N4530V	NC4530V	Under private ownership. It sustained substantial damage during a hard landing on May 22, 1973. As the airworthiness certificate is dated to March 1961, N4530V is likely to be one of the later certificated types.
SV107	D-1538	May 1948	March 1961	April 11, 1973	N514B	NC514B	Destroyed in a fatal April 11, 1973 crash in Texas; after one engine failed, the pilot lost control while trying to avoid power lines. This aircraft was part of a three-way lawsuit between the plane's owner, Bay Aviation, and Bay's local distributor in 1962.
SV108	D-2250	February 1950	June 1961	November 16, 1971	N430MD	N8723A	Destroyed in a fatal November 16, 1971 crash in New Hampshire, when both engines failed upon fuel starvation. The crash was attributed to pilot error (not multi-engine rated, fuel mismanagement). The last registered owner was Don Yenko of Yenko Chevrolet fame.
SV109	D-549	July 1947	January 18, 1962		N3124V	NC3124V	Owned by the Beechcraft Heritage Museum. The FAA Registry lists it as manufactured by Pine Air, with an airworthiness certificate dated to 1970. N3124V suffered substantial damaged in a hard landing on August 27, 1964.
SV110	N/A						Number not used.
SV111	N/A						Number not used.
SV112	D-1243	1948		February 19, 1976	N2115K	NC4438V, N4438V, N177M, N249C, N68JS	Destroyed in a fatal February 19, 1976 crash in Mississippi precipitated by a stall during evasive maneuvers.
SV113	D-1569	1948	September 1961		N551B	NC551B	It was profiled in EAA Sport Aviation and may be the last Super-V to be converted in California, as this serial number is specifically excluded from the Fleet type certificate. N551B is currently owned by the Warbirds of the World Flying Museum in New Mexico.
SV114	D-1388	March 1948	November 1963		N4559V	NC4559V	Presumed not airworthy in 1976, deregistered in 2013. Airframe sold in 2018 for restoration.
SV115	D-422	1947	March 1963	May 30, 1975	N772MD	NC3018V, N1T, N9935R, N147V	Sustained substantial damage in a nonfatal February 26, 1964 crash in Maryland, caused by deflation of the nosewheel strut. It was subsequently damaged in a nonfatal March 29, 1975 collision with fenceposts and later that year destroyed in a fatal May 30, 1975 crash in Omak, Washington. Both incidents were attributed to fuel starvation leading to engine flameout.
SV116	D-1640	June 1948	October 1963	July 5, 1966	N174SV	N617B	Rebuilt from SV101; it was destroyed in a fatal July 5, 1966 crash in Pennsylvania, precipitated by a stall.
SV117	D-1474	1948	March 1963	1981?	N457B	NC457B	Deregistered in 1981 and presumed scrapped.

== Specifications ==
Data from Jane's All The World's Aircraft 1961–62 & Flying (October 1961)

General characteristics

- Crew: one
- Capacity: three passengers
- Length: 25 ft (7.6 m)
- Wingspan: 32 ft 9.5 in (9.995 m)
- Height: 6 ft 6.5 in (1.994 m)
- Wing area: 178 sq ft (16.5 m^{2})
- Empty weight: 2,120 lb (962 kg)
- Gross weight: 3,400 lb (1,542 kg)
- Fuel capacity: 100 US Gallons (379 L)
- Powerplant: 2 × Lycoming O-360-A1C air-cooled flat-four engines, 180 hp (130 kW) each

Performance

- Maximum speed: 218 mph (351 km/h, 189 kn)
- Cruise speed: 196 mph (315 km/h, 170 kn) (65% power)
- Stall speed: 65 mph (105 km/h, 56 kn) flaps down
- Range: 1,400 mi (2,300 km, 1,200 nmi)
- Service ceiling: 23,000 ft (7,000 m)
- Rate of climb: 1,550 ft/min (7.9 m/s)

== See also ==
Related development

- Beechcraft Travel Air
- Beechcraft Baron

Aircraft of comparable role, configuration, and era

- Beechcraft Twin Bonanza
- Camair Twin Navion
- Cessna 310
- Let L-200 Morava
- Piper PA-23 Apache and Aztec
- Piper PA-34 Seneca
- Temco D-16 Twin Navion

Related lists

- List of civil aircraft
