= Hartman monoplane =

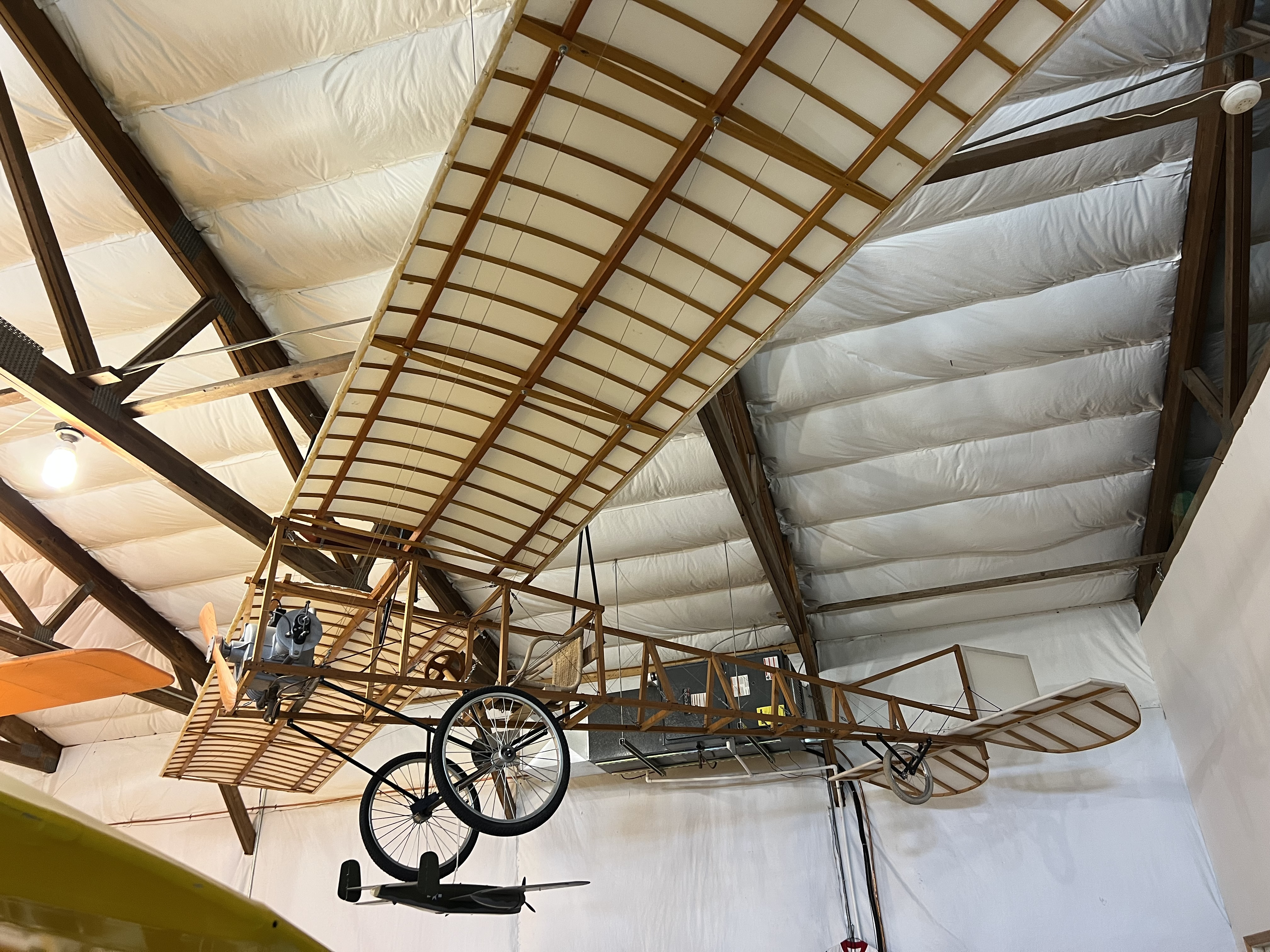
- Hartman monoplane replica at the Iowa Aviation Museum

General information
- Type: Monoplane
- National origin: United States
- Designer: Arthur J. Hartman
- Number built: 1

History
- First flight: 19 May 1910

The 1910 Hartman monoplane or Hartman original was the first aircraft built and flown in Iowa.

== Design and development ==
Arthur J. Hartman built his first monoplane in Burlington, Iowa, completing the project in 1910.

The monoplane was modeled after a Blériot XI. The monoplane is an open framed aircraft with wire-braced fabric covered wings and conventional landing gear, powered by a Detroit aero engine. The fuselage frame, spars, and ribs are made of wood. Roll control was performed with wing-warping.

== Operational history ==
Hartman made one takeoff attempt from the Burlington, Iowa golf course, reaching ten feet in altitude. A hard landing collapsed the landing gear. The aircraft became the first to fly in Iowa. Some consider the short flight not long enough to qualify as the "first flight" and recognize Curtiss Exhibition Team pilot Bud Mars the first to fly in Iowa, in a Curtiss Pusher on 29 June 1910 at Sioux City, Iowa.

In June 1913, the aircraft was converted to a hydroplane, and flew a very short distance before crashing into the water.

The Hartman monoplane was rebuilt with a steel tube fuselage, updated Anzani engine and ailerons. It was flown at airshows by Hartman from 1939 until 1956 when it was donated to the Pioneer Village Museum in Minden, Nebraska.

== Specifications (Hartman monoplane) ==
Data from

General characteristics

- Crew: 1
- Length: 19 ft 9 in (6.02 m)
- Wingspan: 31 ft 4 in (9.55 m)
- Empty weight: 350 lb (159 kg)
- Powerplant: 1 × Detroit Aero two-cylinder, 18 hp (13 kW)

== See also ==
- [www.eaachapter135.org/Images/newsletters/2010-03.pdf Hartman replica project]
