= Grinnell Aeroplane =

Grinnell Aeroplane Company
- Industry: Aircraft and engine manufacturer
- Founded: 1913
- Defunct: 1916
- Fate: Dissolved after death of founder
- Headquarters: Grinnell, Iowa, United States
- Key people: William C "Billy" Robinson

The Grinnell Aeroplane Company was an American aircraft manufacturer based in Grinnell, Iowa, that built aircraft prior to World War I.

== History ==
The company was formed to develop the "Scout" aircraft designed by Billy Robinson. Robinson trained at the Max Lille school in Cicero, Chicago as a mechanic, learning to fly Wright aircraft and Nieuports. He worked for a brief time as a partner in the National Aeroplane Company before leaving to Iowa in 1913. His custom built parasol was the first to fly airmail from Iowa, setting a non-stop distance record of 390 miles. In 1914, the Grinnell Aeroplane company was founded with D.S. Morrison as President. Robinson developed a 706 cubic inch 100 hp six-cylinder air cooled radial engine to be built by the company to power its aircraft. In 1916, fellow Cicero aviator and designer, Otto Timm joined Grinnell Aeroplane as an instructor, and helped develop the Grinnell Biplane. In 1916, the company offered $10,000, training for one pilot from each state, at its factory in order to establish an Iowa station of the Aero Coast Patrol System, a Navy sponsored effort at a coast guard.

Robinson died in May 1916 attempting to break a 17,000 ft altitude record, crashing in Ewart, Iowa. His aircraft was witnessed climbing to altitude, before drifting down like a falling leaf, and gliding to a landing, which was controlled enough to leave skid marks, but rough enough to rupture the fuel tank and ignite the aircraft. Hypoxia was suspected among other reasons for the crash, but the fire made it impossible to verify the exact cause. After the crash Grinnell hired aerobatic pilot A.C. Beech. Beech was to train students using ground trainers to simulate control movements. Business did not pick up after the loss of Robinson. The Robinson engine was tested by the Army in late 1918, but the armistice signing precluded further development. The company was dissolved by 1918.

In the summer of 1916, Otto Timm developed his own Robinson-powered biplane at Grinnell with oversize ailerons for aerobatic demonstration flights. Timm would later found the O.W. Timm Aircraft Company. A Robinson radial engine built by the Dodge Tool company is currently on display at Grinnell College.

== Aircraft ==
Summary of aircraft built by Grinnell Aeroplane
Model name	First flight	Number built	Type
Grinnell-Robinson Scout	1915	1	Parasol
Grinnell-Robinson Biplane	1916	1	Biplane
