= Iowa Aviation Heritage Museum =

- Location within Iowa
- Established: 2001
- Location: Ankeny, Iowa
- Coordinates: 41.6939°N 93.5697°W
- Type: Aviation museum
- Founder: Roger Pointer
- Website: Official website (archived)

The Iowa Aviation Heritage Museum is an aviation museum located at the Ankeny Regional Airport in Ankeny, Iowa.

== History ==
The Iowa Military Aviation Heritage Museum was founded in 2001 when a group associated with the Hawkeye State Squadron of the Confederate Air Force and led by Roger Pointer received funding to build a hangar. The since renamed the Iowa Aviation Heritage Museum planned to open to the public in 2004.

== Exhibits ==
Exhibits include a collection of fifth scale model planes from the 1990 Des Moines Aviation Expo.

== Collection ==
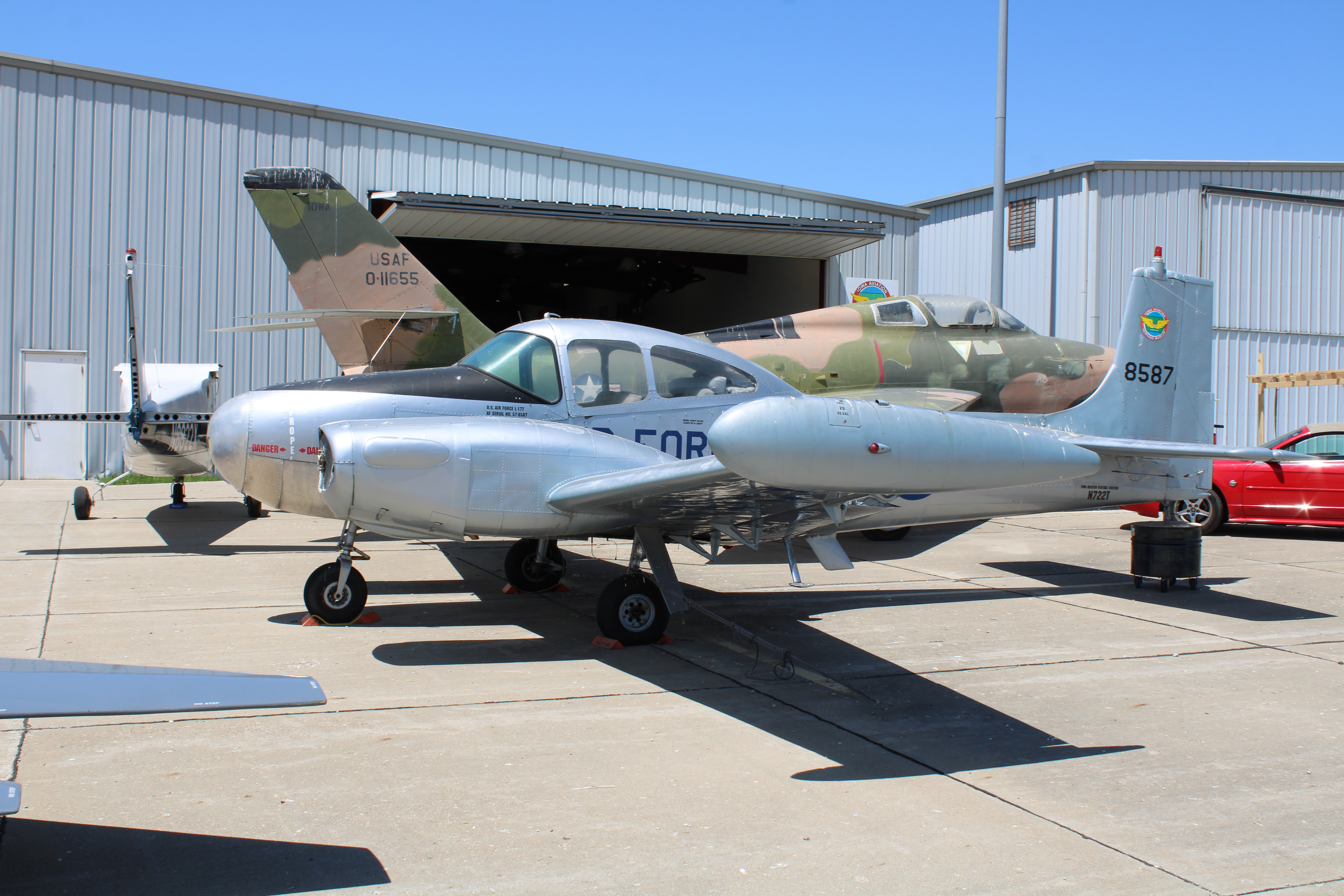
Temco D-16A

- Cessna 172B
- Naval Aircraft Factory N3N-3
- Naval Aircraft Factory N3N-3
- Republic F-84F Thunderstreak
- Stinson L-5 Sentinel
- Temco D-16A
