= Wood County Airport (Ohio) =

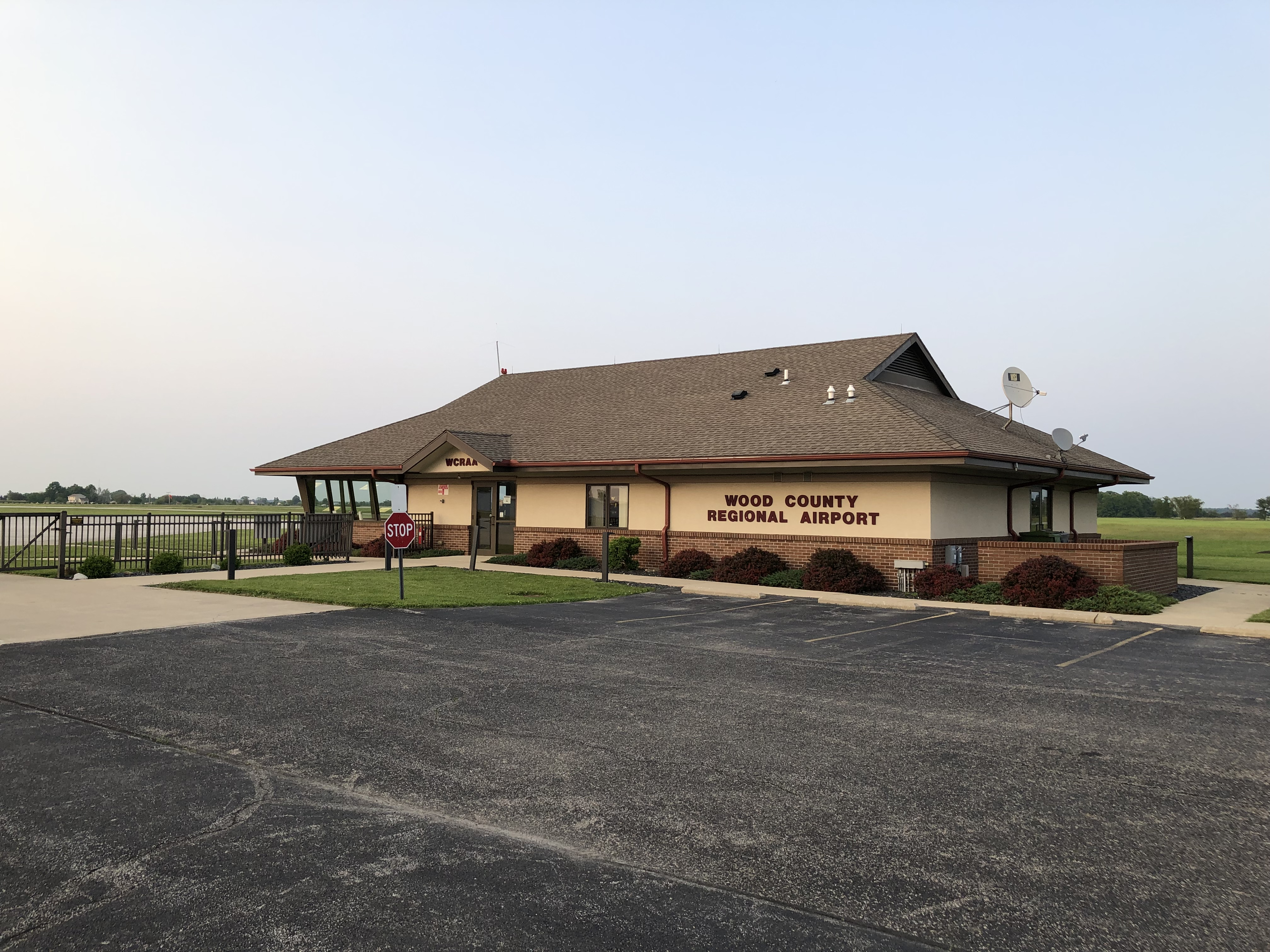
- IATA: none; ICAO: none; FAA LID: 1G0

Summary
- Airport type: Public
- Owner/Operator: Wood County Airport Authority
- Serves: Bowling Green, Ohio
- Location: Wood County, Ohio
- Opened: 1939
- Time zone: UTC−05:00 (-5)
  - Summer (DST): UTC−04:00 (-4)
- Elevation AMSL: 673 ft (205 m)
- Coordinates: 41°23′28″N 083°37′48″W
- Website: WoodCountyAirport.us

Map
- Location of airport in Ohio 1G0 (the United States)

Runways
Direction	Length		Surface
Direction	ft	m	Surface
10/28	4,199	1,280	Asphalt
18/36	2,628	801	Asphalt

Statistics (2020)
- Aircraft operations: 32,485
- Based aircraft: 45
- Source: Federal Aviation Administration

Wood County Airport (FAA LID: 1G0) is a county-owned, public-use airport located one nautical mile (1.85 km) northeast of the central business district of Bowling Green, in Wood County, Ohio, United States on the campus of Bowling Green State University. It is owned by the Wood County Airport Authority and is also known as Wood County Regional Airport (WCRA). As per the FAA's National Plan of Integrated Airport Systems for 2009–2013, it is classified as a general aviation airport.

== History ==
The airport was established in 1939, and purchased by Bowling Green State University in 1942 for use in the V-12 Navy College Training Program. On its acquisition it was named Bricker Field after Ohio governor John W. Bricker. After the war, traffic at the airport decreased well below capacity. A Lockheed T-33 was added as a Gate guardian between 1965 and 1967. The university's 1966 master plan called for closing the field and a local airport authority was formed to build a new airport. However, Bricker Field was transferred from the university to the local government in 1970.

The airport received a federal grant to purchase 37 acres (15 ha) of land in September 1983. Despite public opposition, county commissioners voted to close Mercer Road in January 1986 in preparation for the construction of a new runway. Construction on the 4,200-foot (1,300 m) east-west runway began in June 1987.

A 10,000-square-foot (930 m^{2}) Navion service center had been proposed by mid May 1997.

The roof of a hangar was destroyed by a storm in July 2003, damaging several planes.

$60,000 was stolen from the airport between May 2007 and March 2008. The perpetrator had been a student at Bowling Green State University and assistant manager of the airport.

The Bowling Green Flight Center opened on 27 April 2015.

The airport received a federal grant in 2020 to build and extend a taxiway.

In 2022, the airport authority received a $157,500 grant to perform an environmental assessment of a runway extension at the airport. The airport ultimately received $1.7 million from the Federal Aviation Administration to build and extend a taxiway.

The north-south runway was extended to 3,200 feet (980 m) in 2025.

== Facilities and aircraft ==
=== Facilities ===
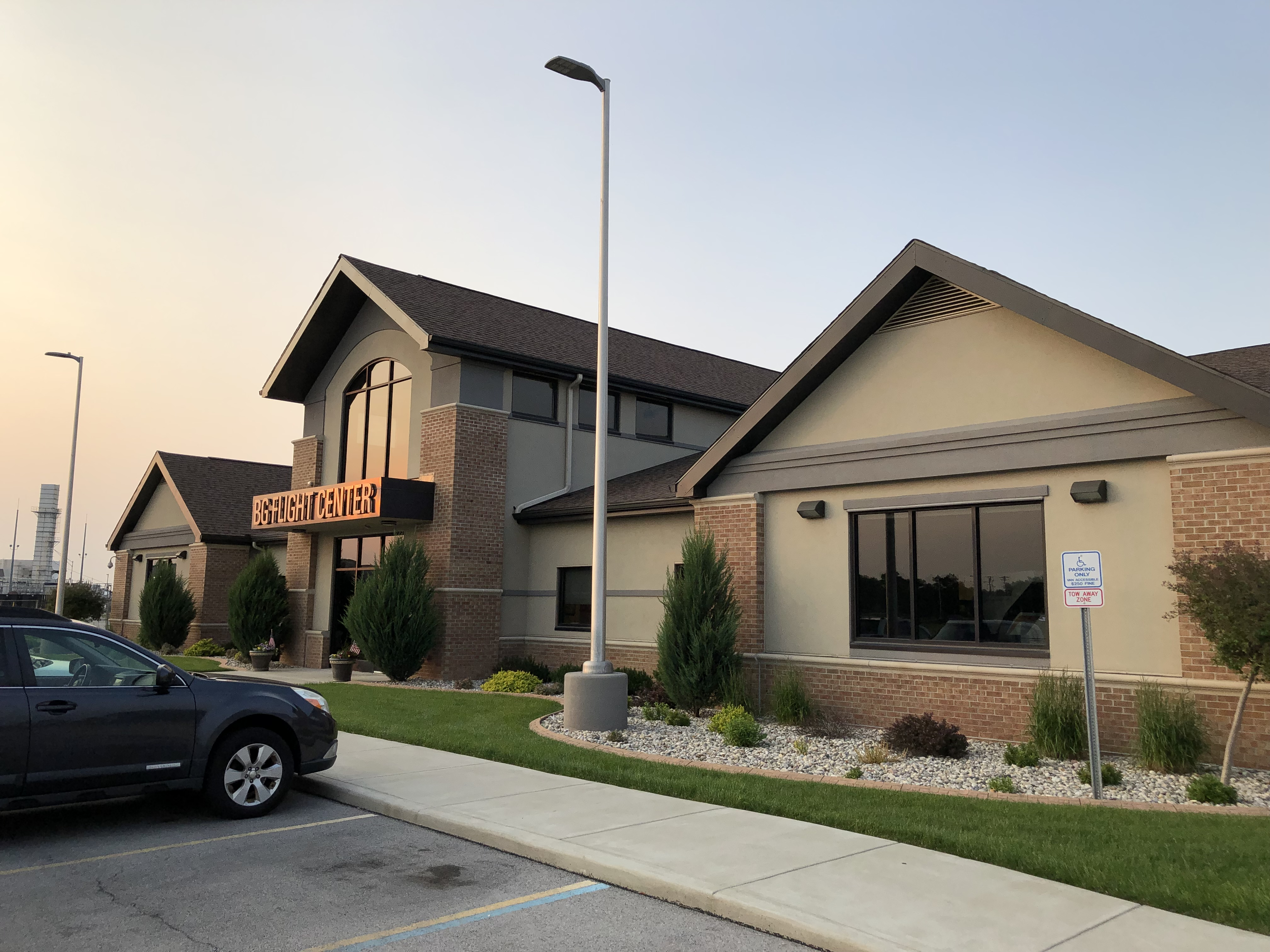
The Bowling Green Flight Center

Wood County Airport covers an area of 118 acres (48 ha) at an elevation of 673 feet (205 m) above mean sea level. It has two asphalt paved runways: runway 10/28 is 4,199 by 75 feet (1,280 x 23 m), and runway 18/36 is 3,200 by 60 feet (975 x 18 m).

The airport has a fixed-base operator that sells both avgas and jet fuel. It offers services such as catering, hangars, conference rooms, pilot supplies, a crew lounge, and more.

The airport has an AWOS IIIP/T in operation.

The Bowling Green Flight Center is a 16,800-square-foot (1,560 m^{2}) aviation education facility at airport run as part of the Bowling Green State University aviation program.

=== Aircraft ===
For the 12-month period ending September 8, 2020, the airport had 32,485 aircraft operations, an average of 89 per day: 99% general aviation, <1% air taxi, and <1% military. This is up from 27,405 movements in 2007. In 2020, there were 45 aircraft based at this airport: 40 single-engine and 5 multi-engine airplanes.

The university fleet at this airport consisted of 19 aircraft in 2019, all either single or multi engine propeller aircraft.

== Accidents and incidents ==
- On July 31,1946, a Stearman Biplane crashed in a nearby farm during an attempted emergency landing at 6:35 pm, killing its pilot.
- On September 23, 1950, a Vultee BT-13 Valiant crashed during landing, killing its pilot. The pilot was from Custar and not a student.
- On 24 February 1967, two single-engine Piper airplanes collided while attempting to land at the airport, injuring the three occupants.
- On May 1, 1982, a Piper PA-28 Cherokee 140 crashed into Frazee Apartments a half mile from the airport. Four on board the plane were killed, but there were no ground fatalities. In the immediate aftermath, the crash was attributed to the plane being overloaded for a flight bound for Columbus. The victims included the pilot, who was a BGSU junior, two people from Napoleon, Ohio, and a student of Northwest State Community College.
- In 1993, a pilot noticed a plane on the runway during his landing, aborting his landing to instead crash in a nearby field. The pilot avoided serious injury but damaged the plane seriously in the process.
- On August 30, 2012, an experimental Kitfox 5 sustained substantial damage when it nosed-over on landing at the Wood County Airport. An instructor pilot onboard said the purpose of the flight was to get the pilot flying, who had not flown for years and was not current, familiarized with his new tailwheel-equipped aircraft. The instructor added that the brakes were sensitive and that it was easy to apply them inadvertently while using the rudders. The pilot had already made two uneventful landings before switching to a grassy area parallel to a hard-surface runway due to a wind shift. On the second grass landing, the pilot applied too much brake pressure while on the landing roll, and the aircraft nosed over. The flight instructor said the accident happened so fast that he did not have time to tell the pilot to get off the brakes and tried to correct the situation by pulling full aft on the control stick. The probable cause of the accident was found to be the pilot receiving instruction's excessive braking during the landing roll, which resulted in a loss of control.
- On December 13, 2013, a Piper PA-28 Cherokee collided with a bird while departing from the Wood County Airport on a training flight. The pilot landed the airplane without further incident.
- On September 13, 2016, the right landing gear of a Piper PA-28R-201 collapsed while taxiing after landing. The aircraft was damaged, but its two occupants were uninjured.
- On January 6, 2019, a Piper PA-28 Cherokee flown by a student pilot was substantially damaged on landing at the Wood County Airport. The student pilot reported that, while on short final, she reduced power to lose altitude and pulled back on the yoke for the landing flare. The main landing wheels touched down and the airplane suddenly veered left. The pilot corrected with right rudder control and applied the brakes, but the aircraft continued left, exited the runway onto the grass infield, and impacted a ditch.
- On September 3, 2025, at about 1135 eastern daylight time, a Piper PA-44-180 Seminole was substantially damaged during a go-around at Wood County Airport. According to the private pilot, who was undergoing a checkride for a private pilot airplane multi-engine land rating while at altitude, the right engine was manually shut down to perform single-engine operations. After completing the single-engine maneuvers at altitude, the private pilot reported that the DPE initiated the procedure to restart the engine. The DPE then stated that he believed the engine had restarted because of the increase in manifold pressure indicated on the engine instrument gauges. Both pilots reported that the right engine was not brought back up to full power to ensure the engine was capable of normal operation after the in-flight shutdown. While on a final approach to land at Wood County Airport, the private pilot reported that his approach was unstable and that he decided to execute a go-around. The private pilot advanced both throttles to full power; however, only the left engine responded, and the airplane yawed to the right. The DPE then took control of the airplane, where he reported that he retracted the landing gear and flaps, and then feathered the right propeller. The DPE stated that the airplane was unable to climb, and it continued to descend. The DPE turned the airplane to the right toward a field, and during the turn, the airplane impacted the field. the airplane sustained substantial damage to both wings and the fuselage.

== See also ==
- List of airports in Ohio
