= Camair Twin Navion =

American model of civilian light aircraft made in the 1950s

Twin Navion
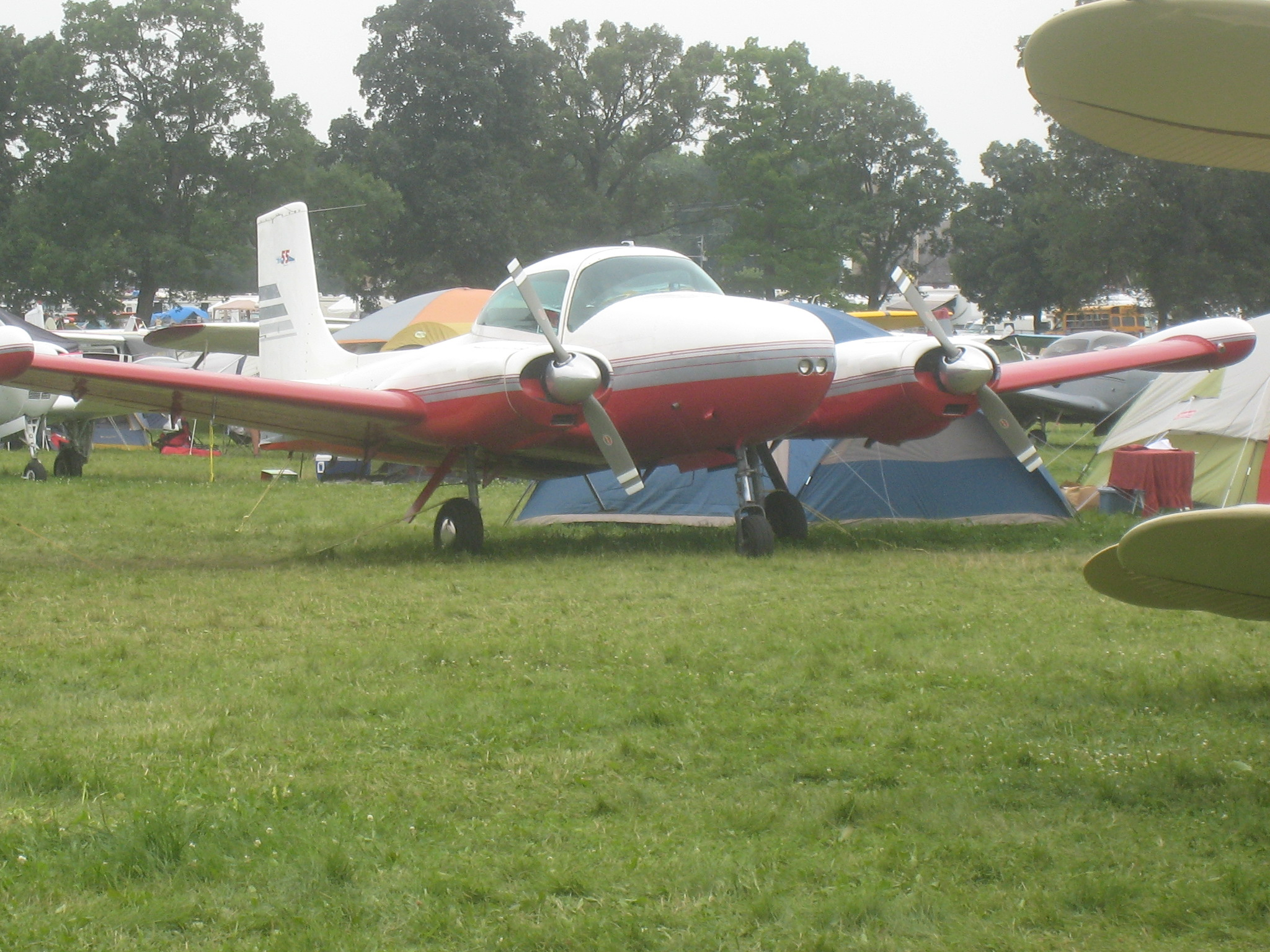
- A similar TEMCO-Riley D-16A conversion in July 2010

General information
- Type: Utility aircraft
- Manufacturer: Camair
- Number built: 33

History
- First flight: 1953
- Developed from: Ryan Navion

The Camair Twin Navion was a civil utility aircraft produced in the United States in the 1950s by converting single-engine Ryan Navions to twin-engine power. It had been one of two programs to improve the performance of the otherwise-pleasing Navion that was generally considered to be underpowered. The other program had resulted in the TEMCO-Riley D-16A Twin Navion. The Twin Navion design had been undertaken by the White brothers of White Engineering in San Antonio, Texas. They replaced the Navion's engine with a baggage compartment, mounted two engines within new nacelles attached to the wing leading edges, fitted the aircraft with a new tail fin made of fiberglass, and added tip tanks made from recycled WWII napalm canisters. Designated the WE-1, the prototype and the rights were sold to Camair soon after its first flight in 1953 and Civil Aviation Authority type certification was achieved in May 1955 under the name Camair 480. Sales were slow and Camair built only 25 examples before selling off the rights in 1959. The ownership of these rights would change hands twice again over the following decade but only another eight aircraft would be built after the end of Camair's involvement

== Specifications (480) ==
Data from Jane's All The World's Aircraft 1956–57

General characteristics

- Crew: 2
- Capacity: 2 passengers
- Length: 28 ft 0 in (8.53 m)
- Wingspan: 34 ft 8 in (10.57 m)
- Height: 10 ft 8 in (3.25 m)
- Wing area: 184.3 sq ft (17.12 m^{2})
- Empty weight: 2,950 lb (1,338 kg)
- Gross weight: 4,323 lb (1,961 kg)
- Fuel capacity: 109 US gal (91 imp gal; 410 L)
- Powerplant: 2 × Continental O-470-3 air-cooled flat-six engines, 240 hp (180 kW) each
- Propellers: 2-bladed Hartzell constant-speed, 6 ft 10 in (2.08 m) diameter

Performance

- Cruise speed: 192 mph (309 km/h, 167 kn) at 6,500 ft (2,000 m) (75% power)
- Stall speed: 62 mph (100 km/h, 54 kn) (wheels and flaps down)
- Range: 900 mi (1,400 km, 780 nmi)
- Service ceiling: 21,000 ft (6,400 m)
- Rate of climb: 1,750 ft/min (8.9 m/s)
- Take-off run to 50 ft (15 m): 905 ft (276 m)
- Landing run from 50 ft (15 m): 900 ft (274 m)

== See also ==
Related development

- Ryan Navion

Aircraft of comparable role, configuration, and era

- Bay Super V Bonanza
- Temco D-16
