= Richard Downing Airport =

Public use airport in Coshocton, Ohio

- IATA: none; ICAO: none; FAA LID: I40

Summary
- Airport type: Public
- Owner: Board of County Commissioners
- Serves: Coshocton, Ohio
- Opened: September 19, 1969
- Time zone: UTC−05:00 (-5)
  - Summer (DST): UTC−04:00 (-4)
- Elevation AMSL: 978 ft / 298 m
- Coordinates: 40°18′33″N 081°51′12″W

Map
- Location of airport in Ohio I40 (the United States)

Runways
| Direction | Length | | Surface |
| Direction | ft | m | Surface |
|---|---|---|---|
| 4/22 | 5,001 | 1,524 | Asphalt (75 ft or 23 m wide) |

Statistics (2023)
- Aircraft Operations: 21,900
- Based aircraft: 19
- Source: Federal Aviation Administration

Richard Downing Airport (FAA LID: I40) is a public use airport located three nautical miles north of Coshocton, Ohio.

The airport hosts regular airshows that feature aerobatic stunts, wing walking, and skydiving.

The airport has been found to add $27 million to the local economy.

== History ==
The idea for a "Coshocton County Airport" began in 1964. However, the hilly topography of the area meant that by mid June 1967 the county was at risk of losing a $100,000 grant from the state because a site had not been selected. The approximately 325 acres (132 ha) of land for the airport was donated by the family of Richard Downing, a World War I aviator and coal company executive who had died just over a year before. (Note: The location had previously been considered and rejected due to the high cost of grading. However, following the offer to donate the land, it was reevaluated and new runway alignment reduced the expense.) The first plane to land at the airport was Governor Jim Rhodes's DC-3 on 8 July 1969 when he visited the area to survey flood damage. The airport opened on 19 September 1969 and by mid-January the following year a hangar had been completed. By late August, land was being cleared for a new Navion factory and a groundbreaking ceremony was held in late October. The airport was dedicated on 12 September 1971. A new access road and four unit t-hangar were completed in June and July 1972. respectively. In March 1973, the reclamation of 34.6 acres (14.0 ha) of land was in process. Missionary Maintenance Services, a faith-based aircraft maintenance shop founded by James Miller, moved to the airport in late 1978.

A taxiway extension was added by 1985. This was followed by a proposal to extend the runway to 5,000 ft (1,500 m) in 1992 and the installation of a satellite-based weather system in 1995.

Runway extension plans were announced in late August 2000. The old terminal building was torn down by early June 2003 to make room for a taxiway. Around the same time an enlarged apron was being built. A new 26,000-square-foot (2,400 m^{2}) National Guard facility was under construction by early June 2004. By early September, a new 3,300 sq ft (310 m^{2}) terminal building was nearly complete and a project to install a perimeter fence was getting underway. The airport announced it would receive federal funding for the runway extension in 2008. The extension was completed in 2010. The airport restaurant, Limburg's Patio Grill, became The Depot Patio Grill in 2013 when new owners took it over. It received additional federal funding in 2015 to resurface the south parallel taxiway.

The airport received a $2.1 million grant in 2021 to build a 7,040-square-foot (654 m^{2}) multipurpose hangar to store up to three medium jets as well as to reclaim abandoned mine land near the property by filling in 6,000 feet (1,800 m) of highwall.

== Facilities and aircraft ==
=== Facilities ===
Richard Downing Airport has one runway, designated 4/22 with an asphalt surface measuring 5,001 by 75 feet (1,524 x 23 m).

The airport has a fixed-base operator that offers limited services. Parking includes hangars and tie-downs for visiting aircraft. Fuel service offers 100LL and Jet-A.

MMS Aviation, a non-profit organization offering maintenance to missionary services at cost, is located at the airport.

=== Aircraft ===
Based on the 12-month period ending May 31, 2023, the airport had 21,900 aircraft operations, an average of 60 per day. This includes 88% general aviation, 11% air taxi, and <1% military.

For the same time period, 19 aircraft are based on the field: 16 single-engine and 3 multi-engine airplanes.

== See also ==
- List of airports in Ohio
