= Arthur J. Hartman =

American pilot and early aircraft builder (1888–1970)

Arthur John Hartman
- Born: July 14, 1888; Burlington, Iowa
- Died: October 19, 1970 (aged 82); Iowa Memorial Hospital; Burlington, Iowa
- Children: Arthur C, Paul K, Marilyn, Jeanette, Marguerite
- Parent(s): Wilhemina and Kosmas Hartman

Arthur John Hartman (July 14, 1888 – October 19, 1970) was an American pilot and early aircraft builder.

== Biography ==
He was born on July 14, 1888, in Burlington, Iowa. Hartman ran away from home at the age of 15 working his first job at the Illinois Steel Boiler Company in Chicago, Illinois, and offering his labor for free at the neighboring Goddard Balloon company. He soloed in a balloon on 6 September 1903, three months before the first heavier than air flight by the Wright Brothers. Hartman would demonstrate parachute drops from a balloon, and at one point from a water tower resulting in a landing in power lines that left him unconscious. Later in 1907, Hartman and a partner built a 67 ft long airship. In 1910 Hartman built the Hartman monoplane, based on a Blériot XI design. His small hop performed on 10 May 1910 became the first flight of an aircraft in Iowa. Hartman founded the short-lived Hartman-Sellers Airplane Company in 1919 with a fleet of one aircraft that produced more income off the hay from the airfield than barnstorming and operations. The Burlington Airplane Company was founded next after World War I to sell Curtiss Jenny services. Hartman remained active in aviation throughout his life founding Burlington Municipal Airport in 1927 and operating a flight school. In 1956 Hartman demonstrated the Hartman Air-Bike, a series of 50 hydrogen balloons propelled by a suspended pedal-powered frame with a propeller. In 1961, Hartman completed a scratch-built Curtiss Jenny, and demonstrated it at the age of 73.

He died on October 19, 1970, in Burlington, Iowa.
