= Lycoming O-340 =

O-340
- Type: Piston aero-engine
- National origin: United States
- Manufacturer: Lycoming Engines
- First run: 1953
- Major applications: Temco D-16; Brantly B-2
- Manufactured: 1954–1957 out of production
- Developed from: Lycoming O-320

The Lycoming O-340 is a family of four-cylinder horizontally opposed, carburetor-equipped aircraft engines, that was manufactured by Lycoming Engines in the mid-1950s.

== Design and development ==
The O-340 was designed by Lycoming specifically for the TEMCO-Riley D-16A Twin Navion project. Jack Riley, the designer of that aircraft was interested in an upgraded version of the Lycoming O-320 that would produce more power to give the Twin Navion a better single-engine service ceiling. The Lycoming O-360 was still years away in development and so a modification of the O-320 was undertaken by Lycoming. The O-320 received longer cylinder barrels and a crankshaft with a longer stroke to increase displacement and different piston connecting rods. This increased the compression to 8.5:1 and boosted power output to 170 hp (127 kW) over the O-320's 150 hp (112 kW). The engine was later used in a number of airplanes and helicopters and also in amateur-built aircraft designs.

The O-340 family of engines covers a range from 160 hp (119 kW) to 170 hp (127 kW). All have a displacement of 340.4 cubic inches (5.58 litres) and the cylinders have air-cooled heads.

The O-340 series was certified under Type Certificate E-277 and first approved on 20 July 1954. The engines are approved for both tractor and pusher applications.

== Variants ==
O-340-A1A
Four-cylinder, horizontally opposed, 340.4 cubic inches (5.58 litres), 170 hp (127 kW) at 2700, dry weight 250 lb (113 kg), Marvel-Schebler MA-4-5 carburetor, Scintilla S4LN-20 and S4LN-21 magneto. Minimum fuel grade 91/96 avgas. Certified on 13 January 1955.

O-340-A2A
Four-cylinder, horizontally opposed, 340.4 cubic inches (5.58 litres), 170 hp (127 kW) at 2700, dry weight 250 lb (113 kg), Marvel-Schebler MA-4-5 carburetor, Scintilla S4LN-20 and S4LN-21 magneto. Minimum fuel grade 91/96 avgas. Identical to the A1A but with no provision for a hydraulic propeller control. Certified on 16 November 1956.

O-340-B1A
Four-cylinder, horizontally opposed, 340.4 cubic inches (5.58 litres), 160 hp (119 kW) at 2700, dry weight 247 lb (112 kg), Marvel-Schebler MA-4-5 carburetor, Scintilla S4LN-20 and S4LN-21 magneto. Minimum fuel grade 80/87 avgas. Identical to the A1A except with a reduced 7.15:1 compression ratio and 160 hp to run on 80/87 fuel. Certified on 20 July 1954. The O-340-B1A was originally certified as just the "O-340", but the designation was changed to "O-340-B1A" on 27 September 1956.

== Applications ==
- Brantly B-2 and B-2A helicopter
- Cessna 170 (modified under STC)
- Oakland Super V
- Piper Apache (modified under STC)
- TEMCO-Riley D-16A Twin Navion

== Specifications (O-340-A1A) ==
Data from TYPE CERTIFICATE DATA SHEET NO. E-277, Revision 5

=== General characteristics ===
- Type: 4-cylinder horizontally opposed, aircraft engine
- Bore: 5.125 in (130 mm)
- Stroke: 4.125 (105 mm)
- Displacement: 340.4 in³ (5.58 litres)
- Dry weight: 250 lb (113 kg) dry

=== Components ===
- Fuel type: 91/96 avgas minimum
- Cooling system: air-cooled

=== Performance ===
- Power output: 170 hp (127 kW) at 2700 rpm
- Specific power: 0.50 hp/in³ (22.7 kW/L)
- Compression ratio: 8.5:1
- Power-to-weight ratio: 0.68hp/lb (1.11 kW/kg)

== See also ==
Related lists

- List of aircraft engines
