= Temco D-16 =

American civil aircraft

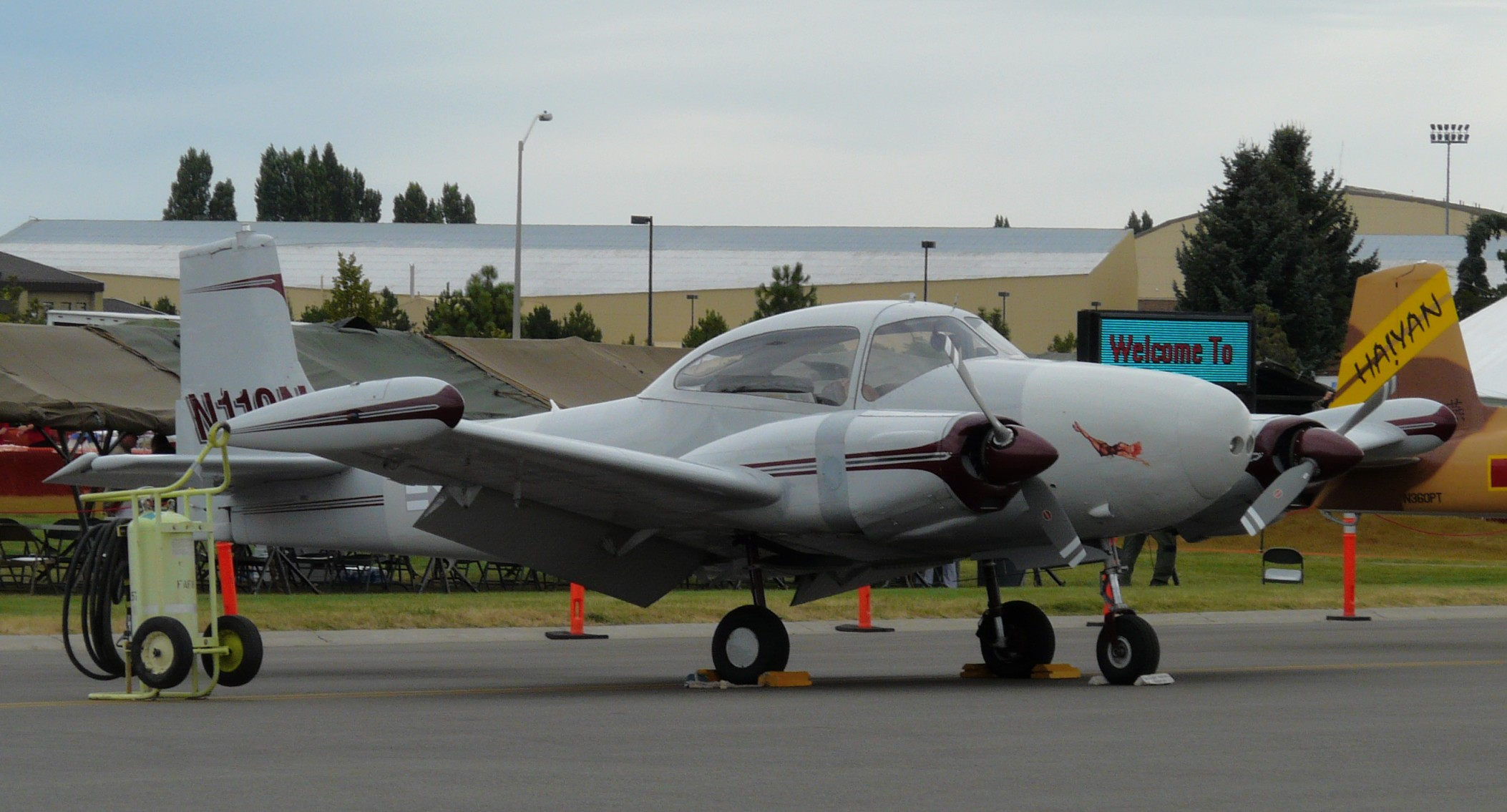
- Temco D-16A

General information
- Type: Business & touring aircraft
- National origin: United States
- Manufacturer: Temco Aircraft
- Number built: 110

History
- Manufactured: 1953-1957
- Introduction date: 1953
- First flight: 1952
- Developed from: Ryan Navion

The Temco D-16 is a 1950s twin engine civil aircraft from the United States. It was produced by conversion of a Ryan Navion to replace its single engine with two wing-mounted engines. It is commonly known as the Twin Navion, although that name is also often applied to a later similar conversion, the Camair 480.

== Background ==
The project began in 1951 as a requirement by Charles Daubenberger for an inexpensive replacement for the corporate Ryan Navion operated by his Dauby Equipment Company, to achieve better reliability while crossing high mountain ranges. He commissioned Roger Keeney of the Acme Aircraft Company to provide a solution, that evolved into a twin engine conversion of a Navion.

== Design and development ==
Jack Riley Sr. built the first model with a team of four. With encouragement from Lycoming, the 125 hp Lycoming O-290 four-cylinder engine was selected for the project. Design changes from the basic Navion structure included strengthened wing spars, that supported engine mounts and other components from Piper PA-18 Super Cub, plus new engine nacelles, a faired nose section that replaced the existing engine and cowling, and a new vertical tail and rudder based on the existing horizontal stabilizer. During testing in 1952, the aircraft was initially named the X-16 Bi-Navion. On 10 November 1952, it was granted certification by the Civil Aeronautics Administration (CAA), after which it was renamed as the D-16 Twin Navion.

A second aircraft was converted for Jack Riley, who specified 140 hp engines, and he purchased the production rights from Dauby. Riley Aircraft then started production of the Riley D-16 Twin Navion, that standardized the design with 150 hp Lycoming O-320 engines and other improvements. In March 1953, after 19 conversions had been carried out, Riley subcontracted production to Temco Aircraft. Temco then purchased the sole production rights, and produced a further 46 conversions under the name Temco D-16. In September 1954, the design was upgraded to include 170 hp Lycoming O-340 engines plus increased fuel capacity in wingtip tanks, officially named Temco D-16A but typically marketed as the Riley 55 for the 1955 model year.

== Operational history ==
In 1957, after 45 conversions to D-16A specification, production ceased in the face of competition from more cost-effective new-build types such as the Piper PA-23 Apache. Many of the D-16 models were upgraded to D-16A standards. In 2012, about 52 Temco D-16 and D-16A models remain on the US civil aircraft register, and at least three are preserved in museum collections.

== Specifications (D-16) ==
Data from Simpson 2001 and FAA Spec 2A1

General characteristics

- Crew: one
- Capacity: three passengers
- Length: 27 ft 2 in (8.28 m)
- Wingspan: 33 ft 4 in (10.16 m)
- Height: 9 ft 6 in (2.9 m)
- Wing area: 178.3 sq ft (16.56 m^{2})
- Empty weight: 2,300 lb (1,043 kg)
- Max takeoff weight: 3,350 lb (1,519 kg)
- Fuel capacity: 59.5 US gal
- Powerplant: 2 × Lycoming O-320 air-cooled flat-four, 150 hp (110 kW) each
- Propellers: 2-bladed

Performance

- Maximum speed: 180 mph (290 km/h, 157 kn)
- Cruise speed: 170 mph (274 km/h, 148 kn)
- Never exceed speed: 190 mph (310 km/h, 165 kn)
- Range: 700 mi (1,120 km, 609 nmi)
- Service ceiling: 20,000 ft (6,100 m)
- Rate of climb: 1,400 ft/min (7.0 m/s)

== See also ==
Related development

- Ryan Navion

Aircraft of comparable role, configuration, and era

- Bay Super V
- Camair Twin Navion
