= Chase County, Kansas =

County in Kansas, United States

- County
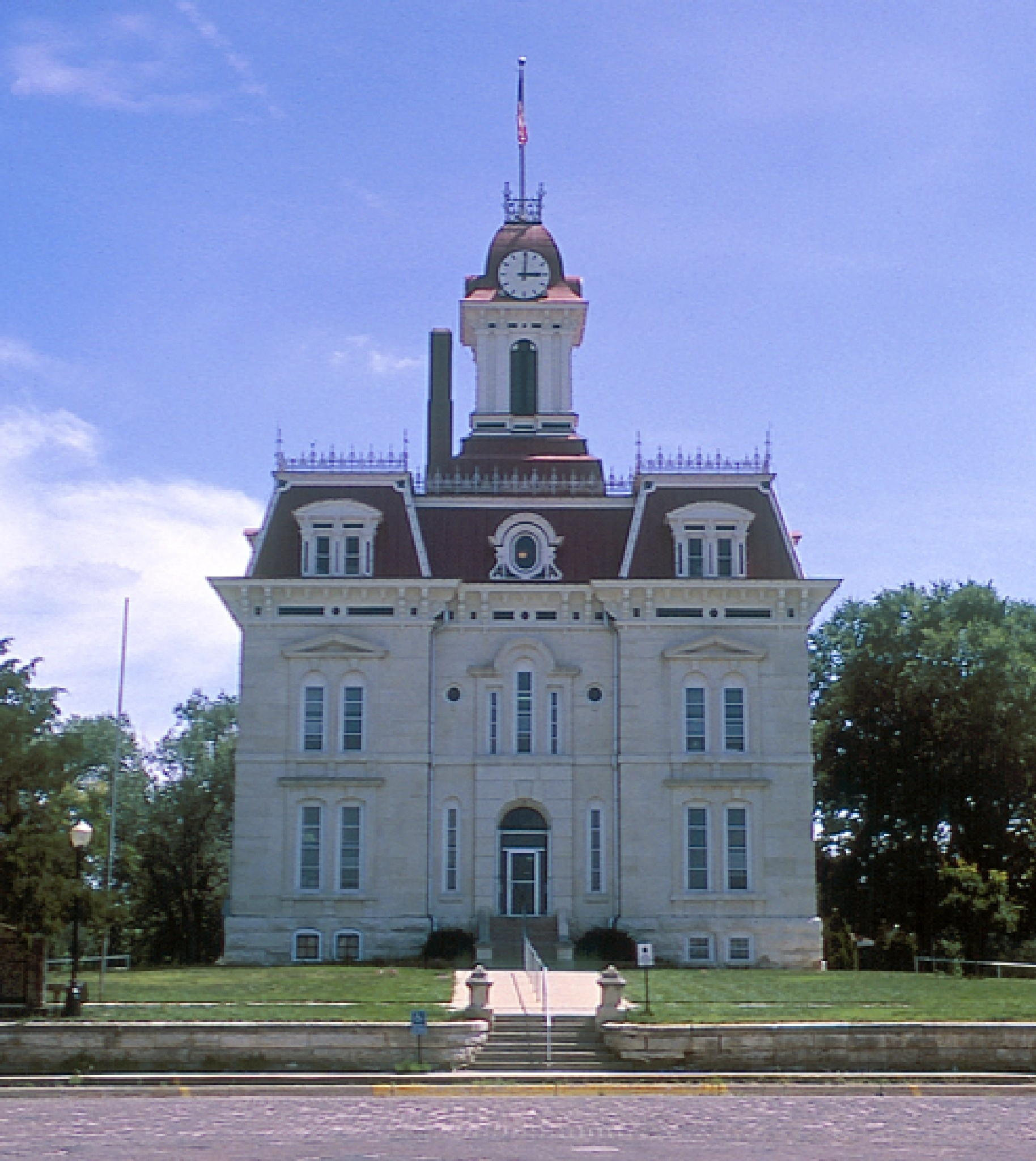
- Chase County Courthouse in Cottonwood Falls

- Location within the U.S. state of Kansas
- Country: United States
- State: Kansas
- Founded: February 11, 1859
- Named for: Salmon P. Chase
- Seat: Cottonwood Falls
- Largest city: Cottonwood Falls

Area
  - Total: 778 sq mi (2,020 km^{2})
  - Land: 773 sq mi (2,000 km^{2})
  - Water: 4.7 sq mi (12 km^{2}) 0.6%

Population (2020)
  - Total: 2,572
  - Estimate (2025): 2,572
  - Density: 3.3/sq mi (1.3/km^{2})
- Time zone: UTC−6 (Central)
  - Summer (DST): UTC−5 (CDT)
- Area code: 620
- Congressional district: 2nd
- Website: chasecountyks.com

Chase County is a county located in the U.S. state of Kansas. Its county seat and most populous city is Cottonwood Falls. As of the 2020 census, the county population was 2,572. The county was named for Salmon Chase, a U.S. Senator from Ohio that was a Kansas statehood advocate. It is best known for the book PrairyErth: A Deep Map, a book written during, and partially about, the discussion within the county about the establishment of the Tallgrass Prairie National Preserve. It is one of several areas in Kansas that utilize prescribed burning for the maintenance of pastureland.

== History ==
=== Early history ===
For many millennia, the Great Plains of North America was inhabited by nomadic Native Americans. From the 16th century to 18th century, the Kingdom of France claimed ownership of large parts of North America. In 1762, after the French and Indian War, France secretly ceded New France to Spain, per the Treaty of Fontainebleau. In 1802, Spain returned most of the land to France, but keeping title to about 7,500 square miles.

In 1803, most of the land for modern day Kansas was acquired by the United States from France as part of the 828,000 square mile Louisiana Purchase for 2.83 cents per acre. In 1848, after the Mexican–American War, the Treaty of Guadalupe Hidalgo with Mexico brought into the United States all or part of land for ten future states, including southwest Kansas. In 1854, the Kansas Territory was organized, then in 1861 Kansas became the 34th U.S. state.

=== 19th century ===
In 1806, Zebulon Pike led the Pike Expedition westward from St Louis, Missouri, of which part of their journey followed the Cottonwood River through modern Chase County.

In 1859, Chase County was established within the Kansas Territory.

In 1871, the Atchison, Topeka and Santa Fe Railway extended a main line from Emporia to Newton. In 1887, Atchison, Topeka and Santa Fe Railway built a branch line from Neva (3 miles west of Strong City) to Superior, Nebraska. This branch line connected Strong City, Neva, Rockland, Diamond Springs, Burdick, Lost Springs, Jacobs, Hope, Navarre, Enterprise, Abilene, Talmage, Manchester, Longford, Oak Hill, Miltonvale, Aurora, Huscher, Concordia, Kackley, Courtland, Webber, Superior. At some time, the line from Neva to Lost Springs was pulled but the right of way has not been abandoned. This branch line was originally called "Strong City and Superior line" but later the name was shortened to the "Strong City line". In 1996, the Atchison, Topeka and Santa Fe Railway merged with Burlington Northern Railroad and renamed to the current BNSF Railway.

On the south-western border with Marion County, there is a noticeable "notch." This was established after a murder took place in the area and the county government of Marion, not wishing to host the trial, permanently ceded the area (one mile wide and eighteen miles long) to Chase County. This shifted the legal jurisdiction of the case, meaning that it was Chase County's responsibility to run the trial.

=== 20th century ===
In 1931, Notre Dame coach Knute Rockne died in a plane crash a few miles southwest of Bazaar, in Chase County, Kansas.

In 1991, the county was the subject of the book PrairyErth: (A Deep Map). The writing of the book coincided with local debate over the establishment of the Tallgrass Prairie National Preserve, ultimately cumulating in its establishment as a joint public/private partnership with the passage of Senate bill S. 2412.

In 1996, the Tallgrass Prairie National Preserve was established in the county following Senate bill S. 2412.

Until circa February 7, 2017, the largest landowner in the county was Bill Haw (the previous CEO of National Farms Inc.). Before selling his property in the county, he possessed two ranches with a combined acreage of 14,000 acres near Bazaar. The land sold was put into a Conservation easement to limit the buildings constructed on the property in an attempt to preserve the natural scenery. It was not added to the Tallgrass Prairie National Preserve.

The center of population of Kansas is located in Cottonwood Falls, Kansas, about four miles north of Strong City.

=== Historical markers ===
- Landmark of Distinction - The Chase County Courthouse.
- Chase County and The Bluestem Pasture Region of Kansas.
- The Bluestem Pasture Region of Kansas.
- W. B. Strong Memorial Railroad Park.

=== Historical maps ===
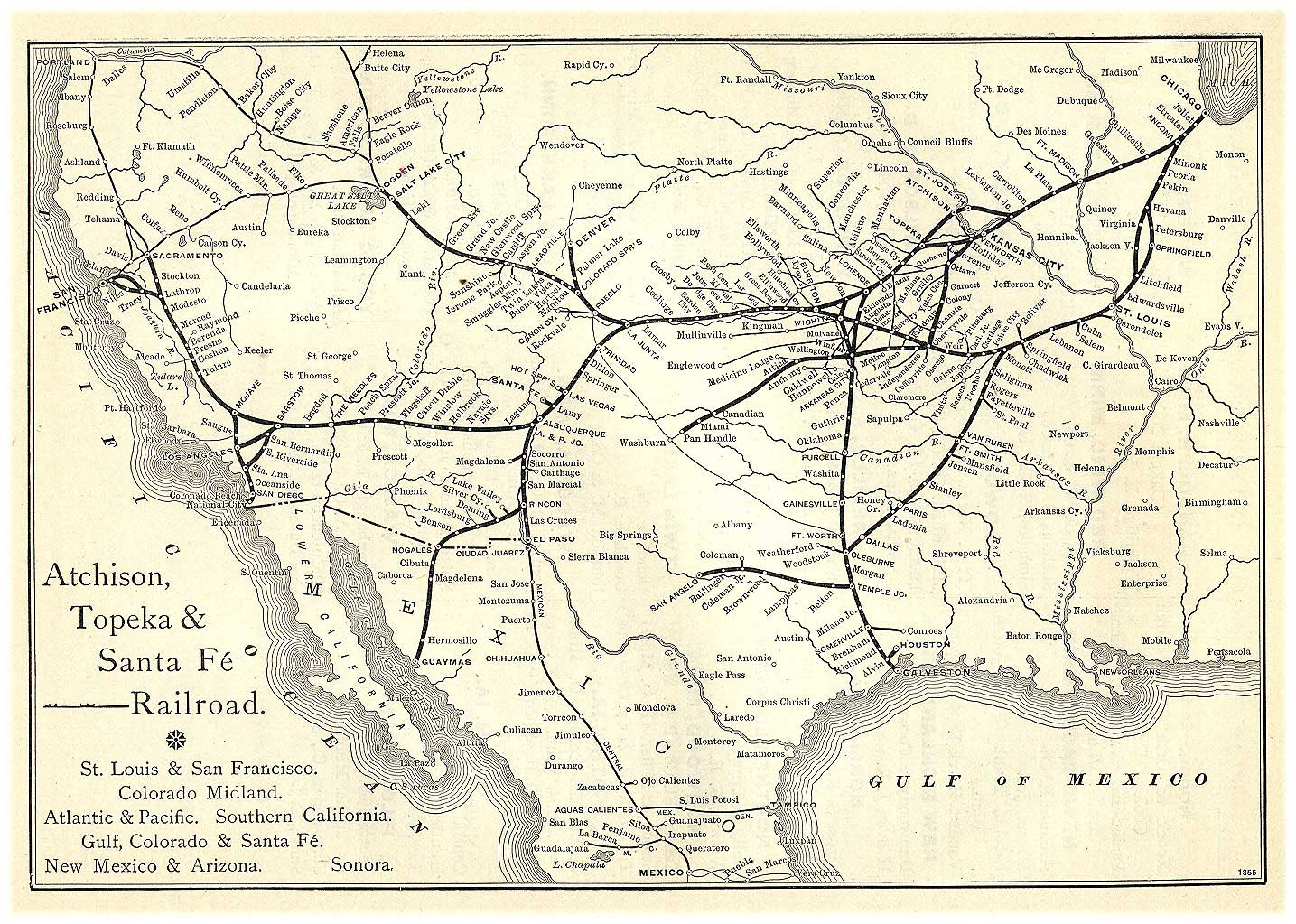
1891 Atchison, Topeka & Santa Fe Railway route map from Grain Dealers and Shippers Gazetteer.

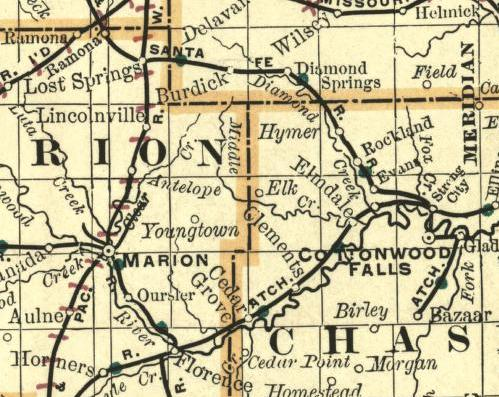
1893 railroad map.

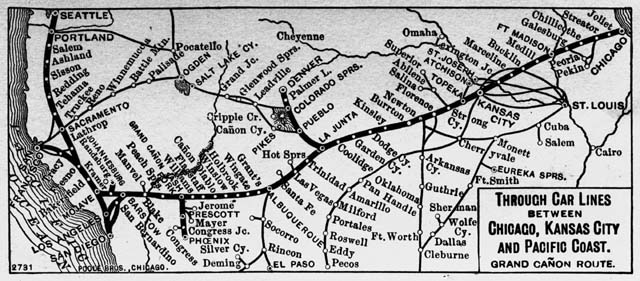
1900-1905 Atchison, Topeka & Santa Fe Railway route map of regular stops

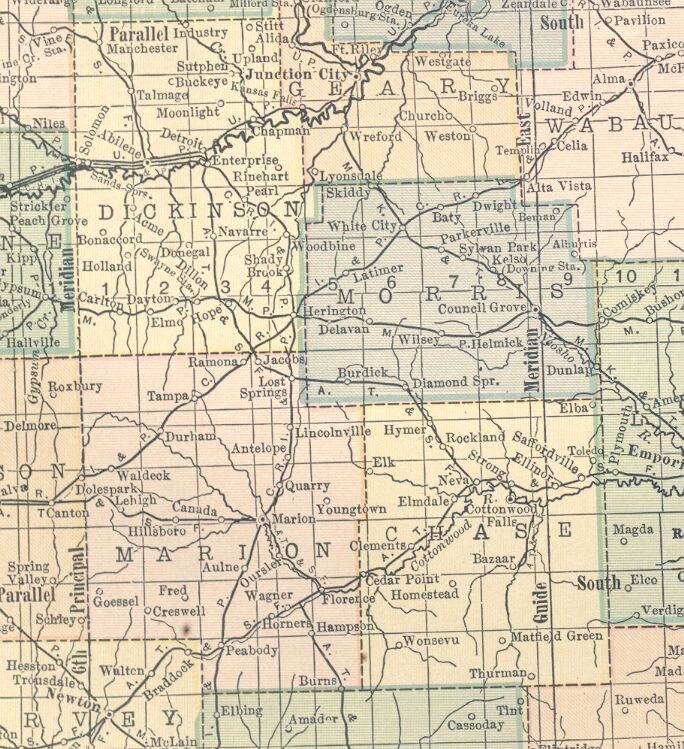
1914 railroad map.

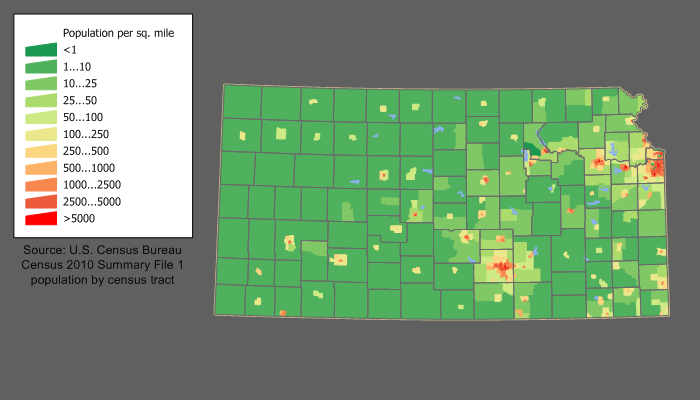
2000 Kansas population map.

== Geography ==
According to the U.S. Census Bureau, the county has a total area of 778 square miles (2,020 km^{2}), of which 773 square miles (2,000 km^{2}) is land and 4.7 square miles (12 km^{2}) (0.6%) is water.

Chase County is centrally located in the eastern half of the state in the Flint Hills geologic region. It's located in the Neosho River drainage basin.

=== Adjacent counties ===
- Morris County (north)
- Lyon County (east)
- Greenwood County (southeast)
- Butler County (southwest)
- Marion County (west)

=== National protected area ===
- Tallgrass Prairie National Preserve

=== Major highways ===
Sources: National Atlas, U.S. Census Bureau

- I-35 / Kansas Turnpike
- US-50
- K-150
- K-177

== Demographics ==
Historical population
Census	Pop.	Note	%±
1860	1,046		—
1870	1,975		88.8%
1880	6,081		207.9%
1890	8,233		35.4%
1900	8,246		0.2%
1910	7,527		−8.7%
1920	7,144		−5.1%
1930	6,952		−2.7%
1940	6,345		−8.7%
1950	4,831		−23.9%
1960	3,921		−18.8%
1970	3,408		−13.1%
1980	3,309		−2.9%
1990	3,021		−8.7%
2000	3,030		0.3%
2010	2,790		−7.9%
2020	2,572		−7.8%
2025 (est.)	2,572	Steady	0.0%
U.S. Decennial Census; 1790-1960 1900-1990; 1990-2000 2010-2020

=== Racial and ethnic composition ===
Chase County, Kansas – Racial and ethnic composition Note: the US Census treats Hispanic/Latino as an ethnic category. This table excludes Latinos from the racial categories and assigns them to a separate category. Hispanics/Latinos may be of any race.
Race / Ethnicity (NH = Non-Hispanic)	Pop 1980	Pop 1990	Pop 2000	Pop 2010	Pop 2020	% 1980	% 1990	% 2000	% 2010	% 2020
White alone (NH)	3,229	2,964	2,910	2,597	2,228	97.58%	98.11%	96.04%	93.08%	86.63%
Black or African American alone (NH)	18	5	28	34	18	0.54%	0.17%	0.92%	1.22%	0.70%
Native American or Alaska Native alone (NH)	17	11	17	12	8	0.51%	0.36%	0.56%	0.43%	0.31%
Asian alone (NH)	3	1	3	8	8	0.09%	0.03%	0.10%	0.29%	0.31%
Native Hawaiian or Pacific Islander alone (NH)	x	x	0	0	1	x	x	0.00%	0.00%	0.04%
Other race alone (NH)	2	0	0	1	9	0.06%	0.00%	0.00%	0.04%	0.35%
Mixed race or Multiracial (NH)	x	x	19	38	78	x	x	0.63%	1.36%	3.03%
Hispanic or Latino (any race)	40	40	53	100	222	1.21%	1.32%	1.75%	3.58%	8.63%
Total	3,309	3,021	3,030	2,790	2,572	100.00%	100.00%	100.00%	100.00%	100.00%

=== 2020 census ===
As of the 2020 census, the county had a population of 2,572 and a median age of 45.4 years. About 20.5% of residents were under the age of 18, 23.3% were 65 years of age or older, and there were 112.2 males for every 100 females and 112.1 males for every 100 females age 18 and over.

None of the county's residents lived in an urban area, while 100.0% lived in rural areas as of the 2020 census.

The racial makeup of the county was 88.3% White, 0.8% Black or African American, 0.6% American Indian and Alaska Native, 0.3% Asian, 0.1% Native Hawaiian and Pacific Islander, 5.7% from some other race, and 4.2% from two or more races. Hispanic or Latino residents of any race comprised 8.6% of the population.

There were 1,056 households in the county, of which 26.5% had children under the age of 18 living with them and 21.5% had a female householder with no spouse or partner present. About 31.7% of all households were made up of individuals and 17.5% had someone living alone who was 65 years of age or older.

There were 1,397 housing units, of which 24.4% were vacant. Among occupied housing units, 76.6% were owner-occupied and 23.4% were renter-occupied. The homeowner vacancy rate was 2.5% and the rental vacancy rate was 10.8%.

=== 2000 census ===
As of the 2000 census, there were 3,030 people, 1,246 households, and 817 families residing in the county. The population density was 4 people per square mile (1.5 people/km^{2}). There were 1,529 housing units at an average density of 2 per square mile (0.77/km^{2}). The racial makeup of the county was 96.90% White, 1.02% Black or African American, 0.56% Native American, 0.13% Asian, 0.56% from other races, and 0.83% from two or more races. Hispanic or Latino of any race were 1.75% of the population.

There were 1,246 households, out of which 28.30% had children under the age of 18 living with them, 54.60% were married couples living together, 7.60% had a female householder with no husband present, and 34.40% were non-families. 31.10% of all households were made up of individuals, and 14.90% had someone living alone who was 65 years of age or older. The average household size was 2.34 and the average family size was 2.92.

In the county, the population was spread out, with 24.10% under the age of 18, 6.50% from 18 to 24, 26.60% from 25 to 44, 24.10% from 45 to 64, and 18.70% who were 65 years of age or older. The median age was 40 years. For every 100 females, there were 103.90 males. For every 100 females age 18 and over, there were 99.40 males.

The median income for a household in the county was $32,656, and the median income for a family was $39,848. Males had a median income of $27,402 versus $21,528 for females. The per capita income for the county was $17,422. About 4.10% of families and 8.60% of the population were below the poverty line, including 10.00% of those under age 18 and 6.30% of those age 65 or over.

== Government ==
=== Presidential elections ===
Chase County is a Republican stronghold. The last Democrat to carry this county was Franklin D. Roosevelt in 1936.

Presidential election results

United States presidential election results for Chase County, Kansas
Year	Republican		Democratic		Third party(ies)	
Year	No.	%	No.	%	No.	%
1888	1,126	54.11%	593	28.50%	362	17.40%
1892	891	47.37%	0	0.00%	990	52.63%
1896	812	44.74%	981	54.05%	22	1.21%
1900	1,084	52.49%	956	46.30%	25	1.21%
1904	1,217	64.39%	562	29.74%	111	5.87%
1908	1,021	53.04%	834	43.32%	70	3.64%
1912	476	25.41%	812	43.35%	585	31.23%
1916	1,356	44.14%	1,584	51.56%	132	4.30%
1920	1,659	63.15%	904	34.41%	64	2.44%
1924	1,822	62.61%	758	26.05%	330	11.34%
1928	2,079	72.79%	739	25.88%	38	1.33%
1932	1,485	45.96%	1,703	52.71%	43	1.33%
1936	1,610	48.42%	1,706	51.31%	9	0.27%
1940	1,871	57.78%	1,344	41.51%	23	0.71%
1944	1,510	59.99%	998	39.65%	9	0.36%
1948	1,432	58.93%	961	39.55%	37	1.52%
1952	1,815	77.76%	513	21.98%	6	0.26%
1956	1,553	74.45%	529	25.36%	4	0.19%
1960	1,276	64.06%	708	35.54%	8	0.40%
1964	902	50.31%	886	49.41%	5	0.28%
1968	1,038	62.61%	462	27.86%	158	9.53%
1972	1,184	76.04%	315	20.23%	58	3.73%
1976	922	57.59%	643	40.16%	36	2.25%
1980	1,073	66.94%	413	25.76%	117	7.30%
1984	1,162	74.01%	393	25.03%	15	0.96%
1988	884	60.63%	538	36.90%	36	2.47%
1992	610	36.20%	470	27.89%	605	35.91%
1996	778	50.19%	496	32.00%	276	17.81%
2000	848	64.39%	391	29.69%	78	5.92%
2004	1,055	70.29%	418	27.85%	28	1.87%
2008	976	70.52%	383	27.67%	25	1.81%
2012	875	68.84%	358	28.17%	38	2.99%
2016	969	70.78%	316	23.08%	84	6.14%
2020	1,123	75.32%	345	23.14%	23	1.54%
2024	1,090	74.56%	348	23.80%	24	1.64%

=== Laws ===
Following amendment to the Kansas Constitution in 1986, the county remained a prohibition, or "dry", county until 1988, when voters approved the sale of alcoholic liquor by the individual drink with a 30% food sales requirement.

== Education ==
=== Unified school districts ===
School districts include:

- Chase County USD 284 (most of the county)

School district office in neighboring county

- Centre USD 397
- Peabody–Burns USD 398
- Marion–Florence USD 408

== Communities ==
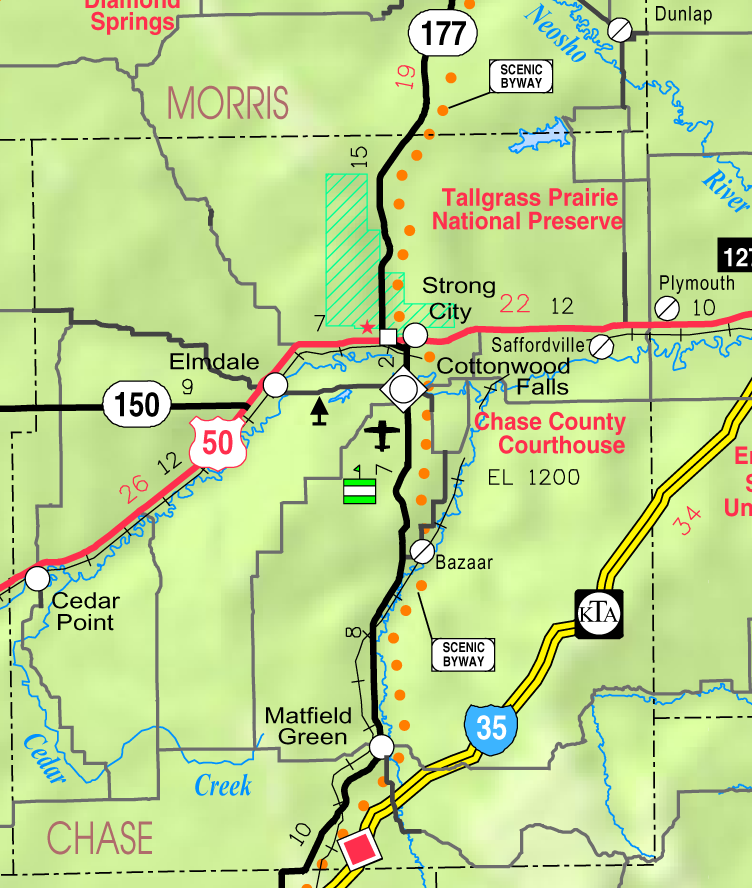
2005 map of Chase County (map legend)

List of townships / incorporated cities / unincorporated communities / extinct former communities within Chase County.

=== Cities ===
- Cedar Point
- Cottonwood Falls (county seat)
- Elmdale
- Matfield Green
- Strong City

=== Unincorporated places ===
- Bazaar
- Clements
- Saffordville
- Toledo
- Wonsevu

=== Ghost towns ===
‡ means a community has portions in an adjacent county.

- Birley
- Clover Cliff
- Elk‡
- Ellinor
- Gladstone
- Homestead
- Hymer
- Morgan
- Neva
- Rockland
- Rural
- Thurman

=== Townships ===
Chase County is divided into nine townships. None of the cities within the county are considered governmentally independent, and all figures for the townships include those of the cities. In the following table, the population center is the largest city (or cities) included in that township's population total, if it is of a significant size.

Township	FIPS	Population center	Population	Population density /km^{2} (/sq mi)	Land area km^{2} (sq mi)	Water area km^{2} (sq mi)	Water %	Geographic coordinates
Bazaar	04700		81	0 (1)	293 (113)	0 (0)	0.17%	38°15′55″N 96°32′3″W
Cedar	11225		116	1 (2)	142 (55)	0 (0)	0.22%	38°8′54″N 96°46′30″W
Cottonwood	15875		184	1 (2)	209 (81)	0 (0)	0.23%	38°17′23″N 96°45′44″W
Diamond Creek	17975		237	1 (2)	373 (144)	1 (0)	0.24%	38°25′31″N 96°40′35″W
Falls	22850	Cottonwood Falls	1,163	9 (23)	131 (51)	1 (0)	0.42%	38°21′55″N 96°32′27″W
Homestead	32950		52	0 (1)	141 (54)	0 (0)	0.27%	38°10′56″N 96°42′14″W
Matfield	45125		155	0 (1)	316 (122)	1 (0)	0.29%	38°8′59″N 96°30′56″W
Strong	68600	Strong City	740	4 (11)	172 (67)	0 (0)	0.24%	38°24′20″N 96°32′18″W
Toledo	70775		302	1 (3)	233 (90)	1 (0)	0.44%	38°24′49″N 96°23′50″W
Sources: "Census 2000 U.S. Gazetteer Files". U.S. Census Bureau, Geography Division. Archived from the original on August 2, 2002.

== In popular culture ==
Chase County was most prominently the focus of the book PrairyErth: A Deep Map (1991) by William Least Heat-Moon, the follow-up to his book Blue Highways.

== NRHP sites ==
The following sites in Chase County are listed on the National Register of Historic Places:

- Cartter Building, Cottonwood Falls
- Cedar Point Mill, Cedar Point
- Chase County Courthouse, Cottonwood Falls
- Chase County National Bank, Cottonwood Falls
- Clements Stone Arch Bridge, Clements
- Clover Cliff Ranch House, Elmdale
- Cottonwood River Bridge, Cottonwood Falls
- Cottonwood River Pratt Truss Bridge, Cedar Point
- Crocker Ranch, Matfield Green
- Fox Creek Stone Arch Bridge, Strong City

== See also ==
- National Register of Historic Places listings in Chase County, Kansas
- Cottonwood River and Great Flood of 1951

Community information for Kansas

- Kansas locations by per capita income
- List of counties in Kansas
- List of townships in Kansas
- List of cities in Kansas
- List of unincorporated communities in Kansas
- List of ghost towns in Kansas
