= PrairyErth =

1991 book by American writer William Least Heat-Moon

PrairyErth (A Deep Map)
- cover of first edition hardback
- Author: William Least Heat-Moon
- Language: English
- Publisher: Houghton Mifflin Company
- Publication date: 1991
- Pages: 624
- ISBN: 0395486025
- OCLC: 994020773

PrairyErth: (a Deep Map) is a 1991 book about Chase County, Kansas by American author William Least Heat-Moon. The author termed it a deep map, popularizing that term for an intensive look at a particular place that included discussion of geography, history, and ecology. The book featured in the bestsellers list of both Publishers Weekly and The New York Times.

== Background ==
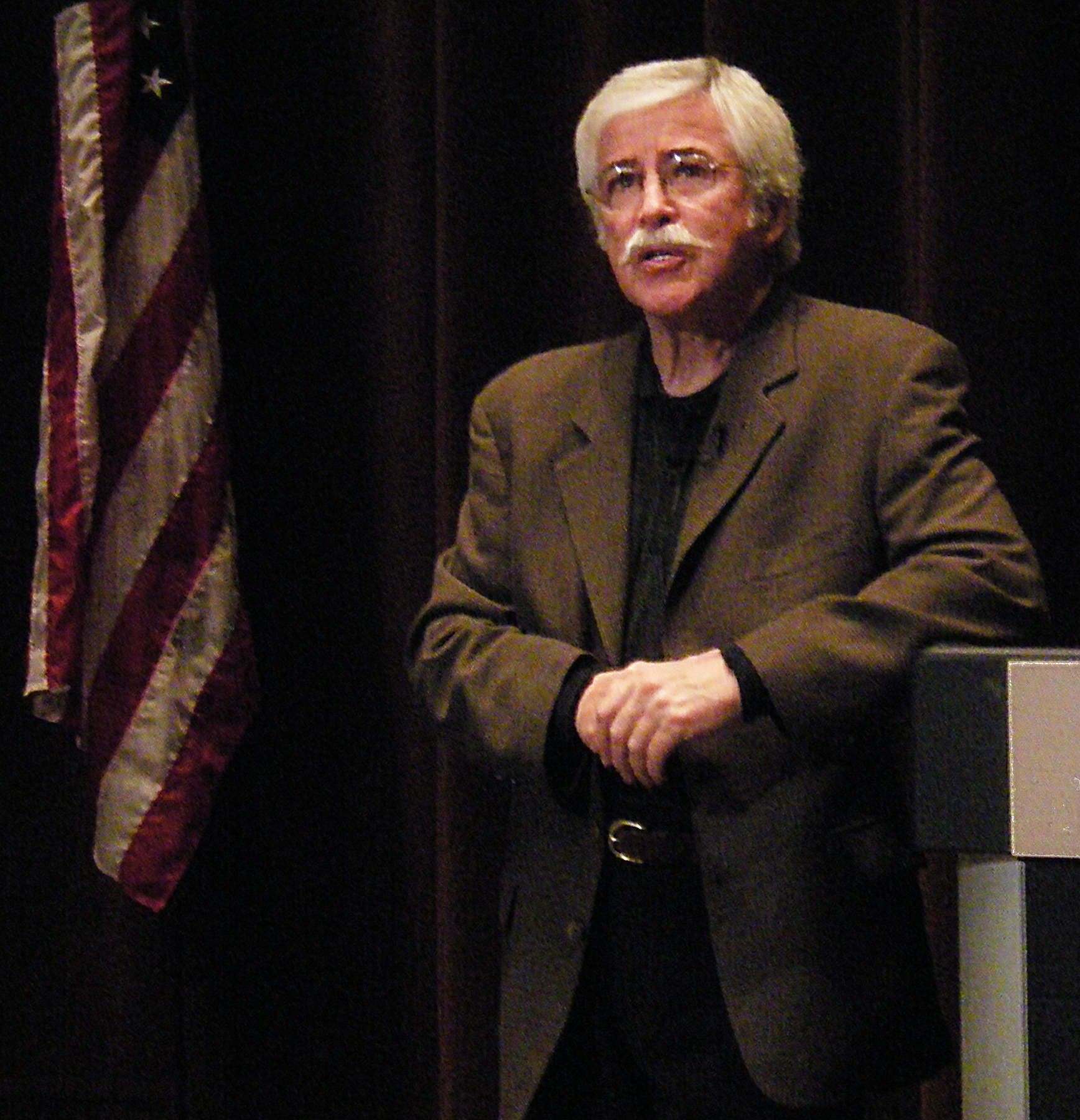
The author, Least Heat-Moon

William Least Heat-Moon (born William Trogdon) was the acclaimed writer of the bestseller Blue Highways (1982) when he began to write PrairyErth. Blue Highways had been a book about his wanderings along America's little-travelled byways, and while PrairyErth is similarly about the undiscovered heart of the United States, it focuses much more narrowly on a particular place.

Chase County is a county in the southeastern quarter of Kansas with a population of about 3,000. Least Heat-Moon estimates that he interviewed about 10% of the county's population in the course of researching the book. The county's geography is dominated by the Flint Hills, and it contains much of the remaining prairie that now exists in the Great Plains. It is about halfway between Wichita and Topeka.

At the time that Least Heat-Moon was writing, there was political debate in Chase County about the possibility of a national park being created to preserve the prairie's ecosystems. In the book, there is extensive discussion of the tension between area ranchers and urban environmentalists over the issue of the park's creation, though many locals also desired the possibility of increased tourism that would come with the park. A few years after the book was published, the Tallgrass Prairie National Preserve was created in a public-private partnership over 70,000 acres of Chase County.

== Contents ==
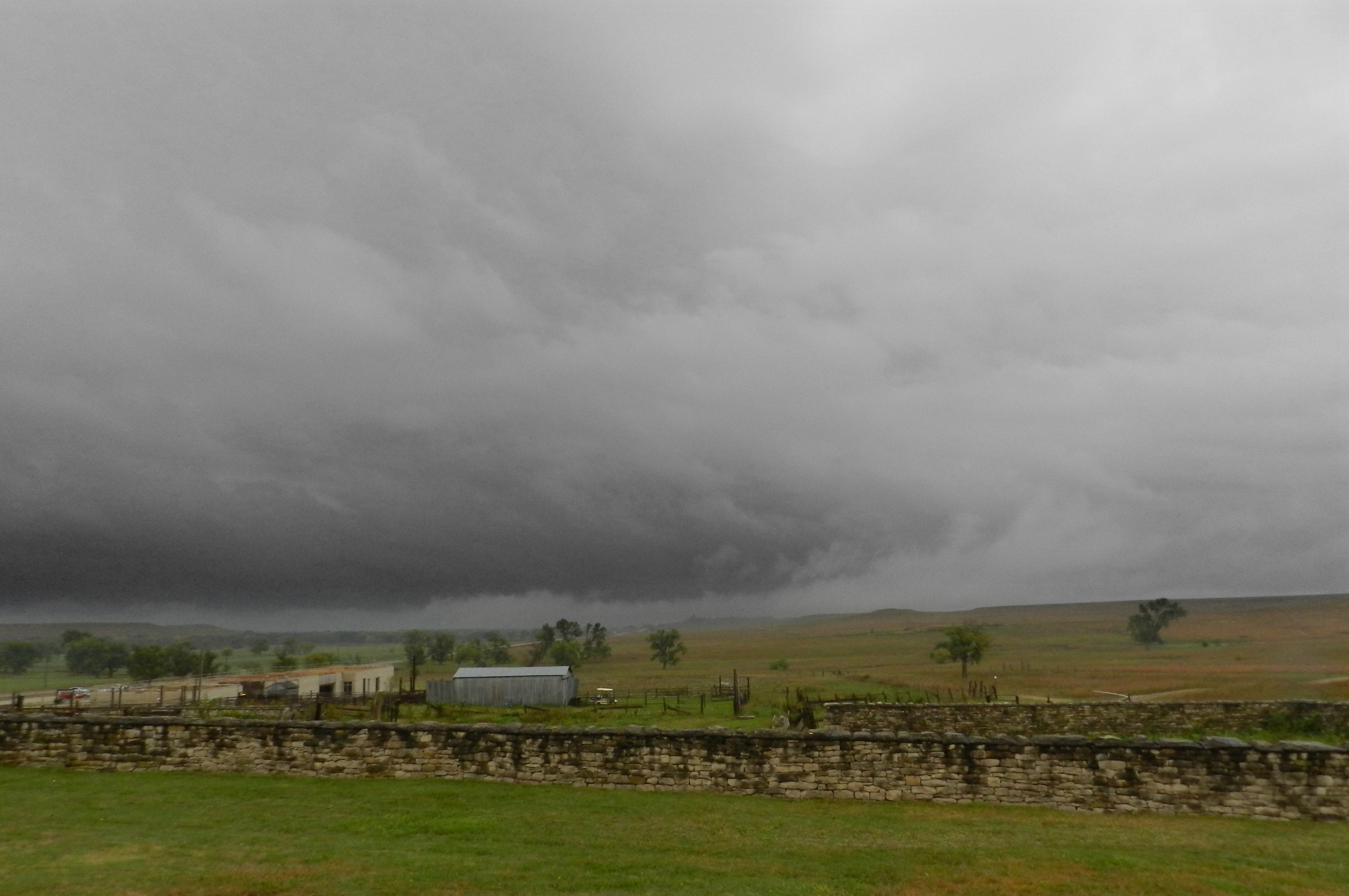
Storm cloud over Chase County

It is history, travel, anthropology, geography, journalism, confession, memoir, natural history and autobiography. It is the life and times of Chase County, and incidentally everything you need to know about Kansas.

— Paul Theroux

At the start of PrairyErth, Least Heat-Moon writes that if a traveler was driving US 50 from Maryland to San Francisco, the place where "she will exclaim from behind her windshield that she has at last arrived in the American West" is in "Kansas in the Flint Hills in Chase County". It was there that the treelessness of the prairie would mean that the "world changes in a few miles from green to blue, from shadows to nearly unbroken sunlight, from intermittent breezes to a wind blowing steadily as if out of the lungs of the universe."

The book is made up of twelve sections, each corresponding to rectangular divisions of Chase County as set out in U.S. Geological Survey maps. That twelve-fold distinction is marked with a distinctive lined icon that recurs throughout the book. Every section contains six chapters. In general, PrairyErth is arranged geographically rather than chronologically, with the individual stories told in each chapter standing in no particular order. They stand as "a kind of collage, an object made of other, randomly arranged objects, a complex composite image revealing past, present, and future all at once in any one piece."

The sections are as follows:

1. Saffordville
2. Gladstone
3. Thrall-Northwest
4. Fox Creek
5. Bazaar
6. Matfield Green
7. Hymer
8. Elmdale
9. Homestead
10. Elk
11. Cedar Point
12. Wonsevu

Least Heat-Moon discusses many diverse topics including a complete inventory of a prairie schooner with more than 200 items, lists of different local terms of animals and plants, many newspaper reports, and a complete chapter on the etymology and spelling of Kansas. Each chapter begins with a collection of quotes, with William Allen White, Walt Whitman and Carl Becker appearing particularly frequently. PrairyErth also discusses at length the county's ecology, geography, and geology, including a chapter on the ancient Nemaha Mountains, now deep below the surface. He recounts a joke from a geologist that state highways in Kansas should put up a sign saying "MOUNTAIN BURIAL PROJECT NOW COMPLETE". There are also many portraits of the people that have lived and made their mark on the county, including Fidel Ybarra, Santa Fe railway worker, Linda Thurston, local feminist, Arthur Edward Stillwell, railway tycoon, and football star Knute Rockne who died in a 1931 plane crash in the county.

== Reception ==
Paul Theroux wrote in The New York Times that the book was a "wonderful and welcome book [that] has the distinct virtue of being completely unexpected" and that it was, at heart, a "good-hearted book about the heart of the country." He also noted the book's length and its lack of discussion politics or the world beyond Chase County. Verlyn Klinkenborg wrote in LA Times that it was a "rich and revealing book". He goes on to say that the book is "full of problems", stating that when "he listens, Chase County, Kansas, comes to life, and the air is full of the sound of meadowlarks. When he speaks, all the other voices--the true voices of Kansas--fall silent."

Professor O. Alan Weltzien at the University of Montana Western has argued that Least Heat-Moon "like any essayist of place, advocates an essentially religious view of landscape: one that construes the land as divine, one whose expertise is marked by humility". Bill McKibben wrote that he was "bowled over, blown away, swept off my pins by PrairyErth" and compared it to Moby Dick.

PrairyErth spent eleven weeks on The New York Times Best Seller list.

Since its publication, it has been the subject of a 2010 documentary by John O'Hara, charting the impact of the book on the county and how it has changed since the research conducted in the 1980s.

== See also ==
- Chase County, Kansas
- Psychogeography
