= K-150 (Kansas highway) =

State highway in Kansas, U.S.

K-150
- K-150 highlighted in red

Route information
- Maintained by KDOT
- Length: 16.645 mi (26.788 km)
- Existed: July 1, 1937–present

Major junctions
- West end: US-56 / US-77 northeast of Marion
- East end: US-50 southwest of Elmdale

Location
- Country: United States
- State: Kansas
- Counties: Marion, Chase

Highway system
- Kansas State Highway System; Interstate; US; State; Spurs
← K-149	→ K-152

K-150 is a 16.645-mile (26.788 km) east–west state highway in the U.S. state of Kansas. The route begins at a roundabout with U.S. Route 56 (US-56) and US-77 northeast of Marion and runs east to a junction with US-50 southwest of Elmdale. It runs through the Flint Hills region of Kansas, and is a two-lane road its entire length. There are no cities or towns along the road, but it provides a direct link for traffic from Marion, Hillsboro, McPherson and points west to Emporia and the Kansas Turnpike.

Before state highways were numbered in Kansas there were auto trails, which were an informal network of marked routes that existed in the United States and Canada in the early part of the 20th century. The western terminus connects to the former Old Santa Fe Trail, South West Trail, National Old Trails Road and Kansas-Oklahoma-Texas Highway. The eastern terminus connects to the former New Santa Fe Trail. K-150 was first designated a state highway on July 1, 1937, and its alignment has not been changed since. In 2015, the western terminus was upgraded to a roundabout. From 1955 to 1996, there was a second K-150 that ran from Olathe to the Missouri state line.

== Route description ==
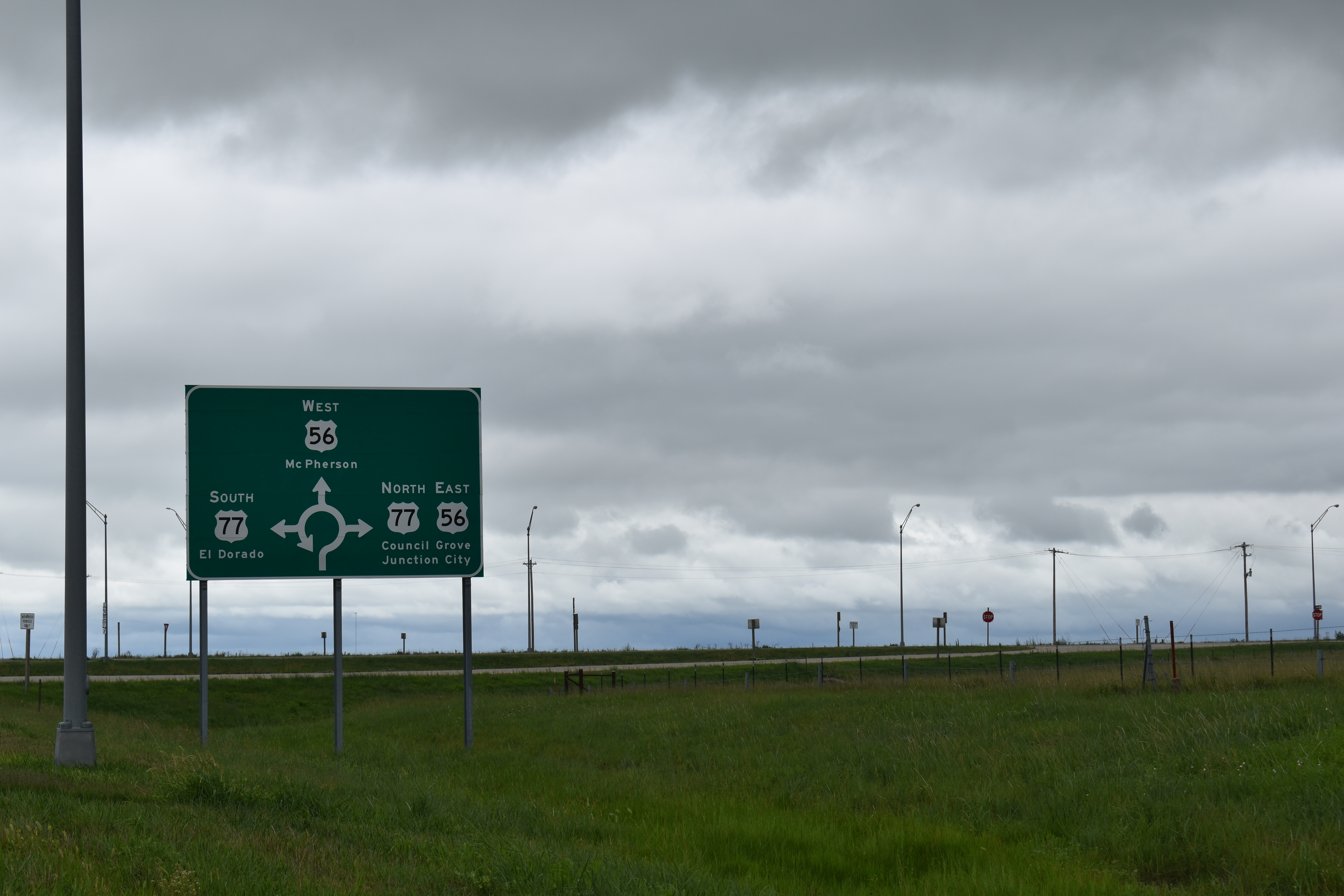
K-150 at its western terminus

The route begins at a roundabout intersection with US-56 and US-77, at the southern end of their concurrency. From there, the route heads straight east through farmland, and after about 2.8 miles (4.5 km) crosses Martin Creek. Just past the creek the route intersects Yarrow Road, as it passes by a couple farmhouses. It then intersects Zebulon Road and then Alfalfa Road, passing by Grant Cemetery in between. The highway continues two miles (3.2 km) past here then intersects Clover Road. After an intersection with Clover Road, the fields around the highway turn into grassland as K-150 continues east, and enters into Chase County one mile (1.6 km) later. As K-150 enters the county, it soon intersects C Road, then crosses Silver Creek 1.4 miles (2.3 km) later. It continues 3.5 miles (5.6 km) through grasslands then crosses Gould Creek. The road then ends 2.7 miles (4.3 km) later at US-50, which runs diagonally, south of Elmdale.

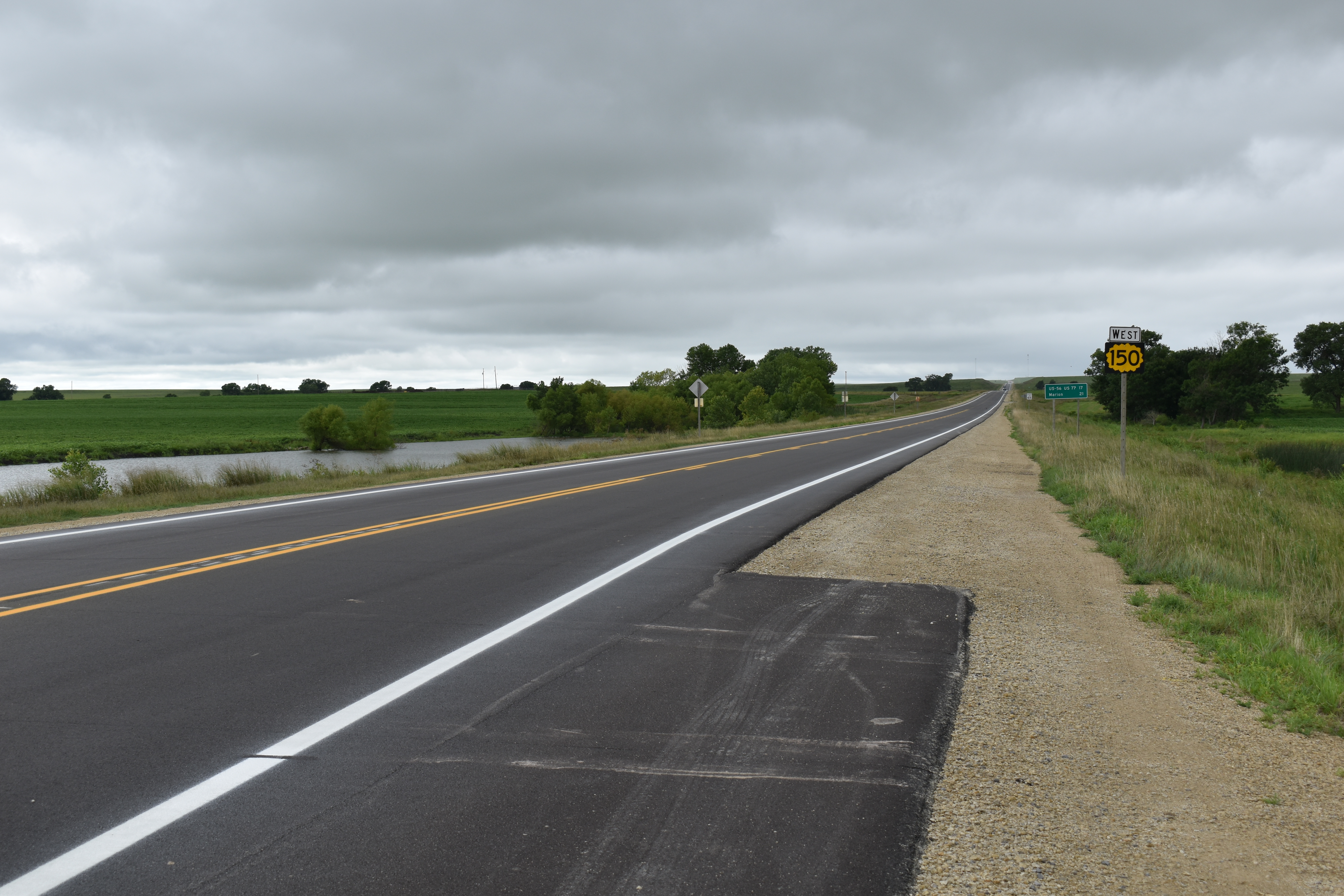
K-150 westbound at its eastern terminus

The Kansas Department of Transportation (KDOT) tracks the traffic levels on its highways, and in 2018, they determined that on average the traffic was 1490 vehicles per day near each terminus. K-150 is not included in the National Highway System. The National Highway System is a system of highways important to the nation's defense, economy, and mobility. K-150 does connect to the National Highway System at its eastern and western terminus.

== History ==
=== Early roads ===
Before state highways were numbered in Kansas there were auto trails, which were an informal network of marked routes that existed in the United States and Canada in the early part of the 20th century. The western terminus of K-150 connects to the former Old Santa Fe Trail, South West Trail, National Old Trails Road and Kansas-Oklahoma-Texas Highway. The eastern terminus connects to the former New Santa Fe Trail.

=== Establishment and realignments ===
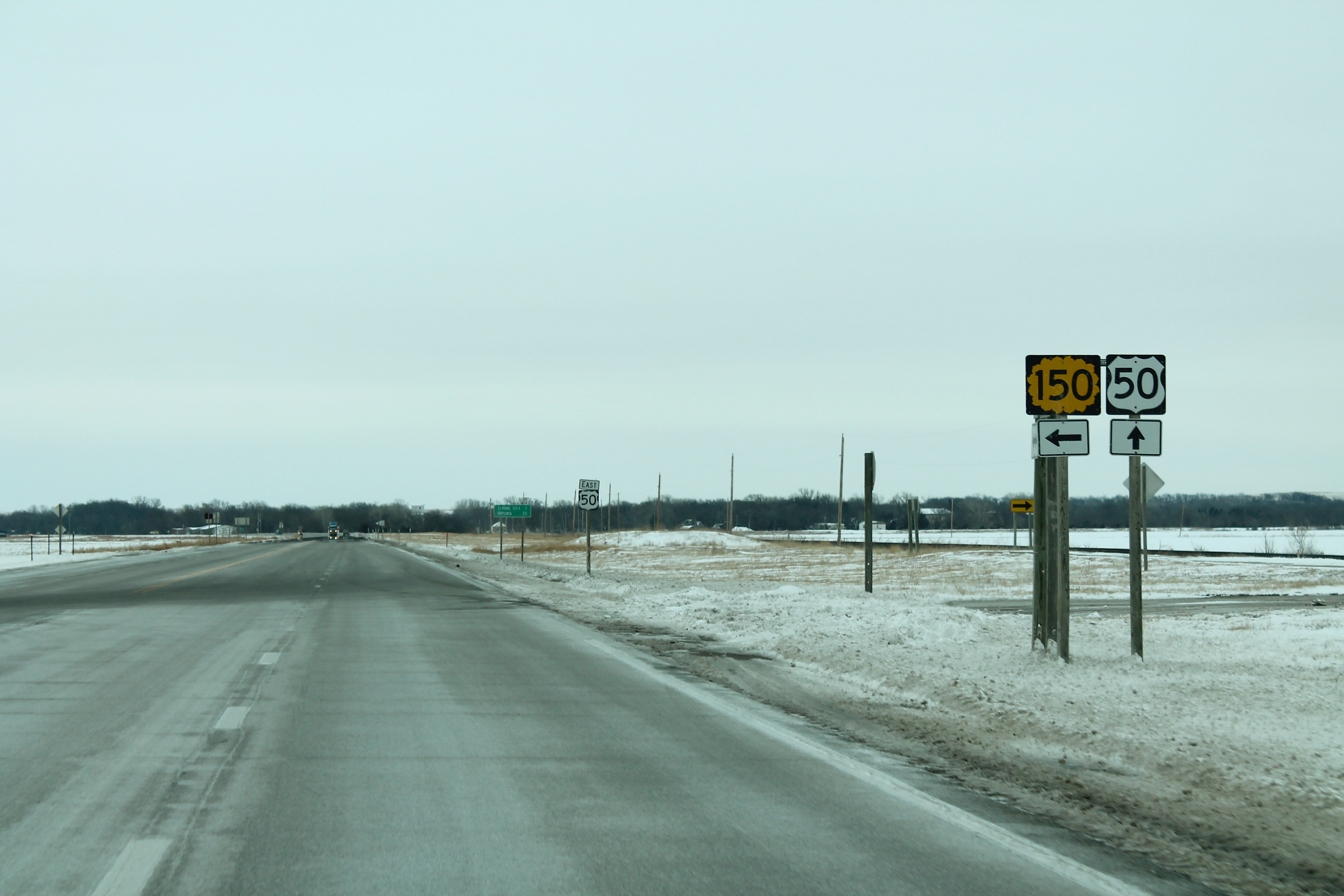
US-50 at its junction with K-150

K-150 was first designated a state highway in a July 1, 1937 resolution and at that time ran from US-50N and US-77 eastward to US-50S. It was first noted on the 1937 Kansas state roadmap. On June 27, 1956, the AASHO Route Numbering Committee approved US 56, between Springer, New Mexico, and Kansas City, Missouri. At this time US-50N was renumbered to US-56 and US-50S was renumbered to US-50.

The route has changed little, but in August 2001, work began on a $17.5 million (equivalent to $29.5 million in 2024) project to reconstruct the entire length of K-150. New bridges were built, asphalt shoulders were added and the sight distances were improved. Work was completed by August 2003. In 2012, KDOT decided that the western terminus was to be rebuilt as an enhanced roundabout. Construction on the $5.416 million (equivalent to $6.98 million in 2024) enhanced roundabout at the western terminus began in June 2015. The roundabout was enhanced by leaving in place the shooflies that were installed to take traffic around the site during construction. This allows oversized trucks that wouldn't fit on the roundabout to pass. K-150 was closed from early September 2015, to late December 2015, and traffic was detoured south along US-77 to make room for construction on that section of the roundabout. The roundabout was completed and open to traffic in December 2015.

K-150
- Location: Olathe–Missouri border
- Existed: January 5, 1955–March 31, 1996

On January 5, 1955, a second K-150 was established in Johnson County. It began at K-7 in Olathe and began traveling eastward and soon reached an interchange with I-35, US-50 and US-56. At this point it was joined by US-169, and the two routes continued east to an interchange with US-69. Here US-169 turned north as K-150 continued east to the Missouri border, where it became Route 150. The highway was decommissioned on March 31, 1996, when US-169 was realigned to travel further north along I-35. Also, Olathe and Overland Park had annexed more land around K-150, and would have run entirely through city limits, which is against Kansas law.

== Major intersections ==
County	Location	mi	km	Destinations	Notes
Marion	Centre Township	0.000	0.000	US-56 / US-77 – McPherson, El Dorado, Council Grove, Junction City	Western terminus; roundabout
Chase	Diamond Creek Township	16.645	26.788	US-50 – Strong City, Emporia, Florence	Eastern terminus
1.000 mi = 1.609 km; 1.000 km = 0.621 mi

== See also ==
- List of state highways in Kansas
