= Crocker Ranch =

- U.S. National Register of Historic Places
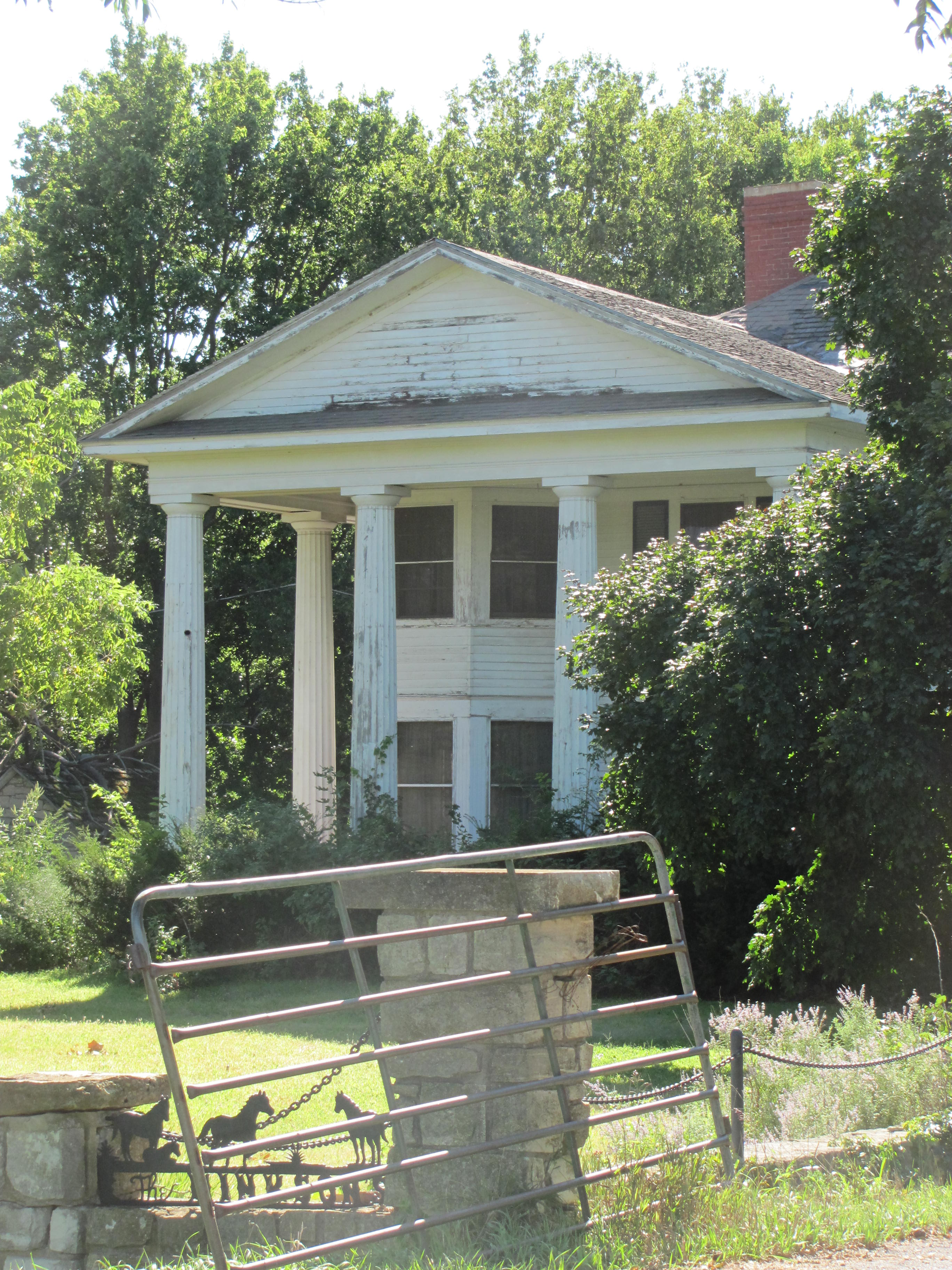

- Location within Kansas
- Nearest city: Matfield Green, Kansas
- Coordinates: 38°10′55″N 96°34′05″W
- Area: 8.5 acres (3.4 ha)
- Built: 1865
- Architect: Gross, Charles
- NRHP reference No.: 77000575
- Added to NRHP: November 17, 1977

The Crocker Ranch, located 1.5 miles (2.4 km) north of Matfield Green, Kansas, dates from 1865. An 8.5 acres (3.4 ha) portion of the ranch was listed on the National Register of Historic Places in 1977. The listing included five contributing buildings. It is located 1.5 miles (2.4 km) north of Matfield Green on K-177.

The Crocker Ranch, with its extensive cattle and farming operations, was begun in 1866 by Captain Erastus Bryant Crocker, a Civil War veteran. Only one building, which is a stone provision house, survives from the original 1860s farm. A house and various buildings were built by Erastus Crocker's son Edward Grey Crocker in the 1880s. The main house was built in 1908-09 and was later remodeled. Other surviving structures include a barn built in 1906 and a grain elevator added in 1915–16.

The east-facing main house has an "impressive L-shaped Doric portico [which] is the dominating feature of the ranch." The house originally had an L-shaped veranda and a round tower with a spire; the veranda was replaced by the Doric portico and the formerly circular corner now has octagonal edges. It has a two-story main section with a high hipped roof, a two-story wing to the south and a one-story wing to the north.

The house was reportedly designed by Emporia, Kansas architect Charles Gross. Carpenters and craftsman who worked on the house included John Martin, Will Jones, Jim Quinn, Will Beach and Charles Remy.
