= Falls Township, Kansas =

Falls Township, Kansas may refer to:

- Falls Township, Chase County, Kansas
- Falls Township, Sumner County, Kansas
