= Matfield (disambiguation) =

Matfield is a village in Kent, England.

Matfield may also refer to:

- Matfield Township, Chase County, Kansas
- Matfield River, Massachusetts
- Victor Matfield (born 1977), South African rugby player
