= Cottonwood Township, Kansas =

Cottonwood Township
- Township
- Location within Chase County

- Location within the state of Kansas
- Coordinates: 38°17′25″N 096°44′46″W
- Country: United States
- State: Kansas
- County: Chase

Area
  - Total: 80.82 sq mi (209.32 km^{2})
  - Land: 80.63 sq mi (208.84 km^{2})
  - Water: 0.19 sq mi (0.48 km^{2}) 0.23%
- Elevation: 1,207 ft (368 m)

Population (2000)
  - Total: 184
  - Density: 2.3/sq mi (0.9/km^{2})
- GNIS feature ID: 0477387

Cottonwood Township is a township in Chase County, Kansas, United States. As of the 2000 census, its population was 184.

== Geography ==
Cottonwood Township covers an area of 80.82 square miles (209.3 km^{2}). The streams of Bruno Creek, Cedar Creek, Coon Creek, Coyne Branch, French Creek, Gould Creek, Holmes Creek and Silver Creek run through this township.

== Communities ==
The township contains the following settlements:

- City of Cedar Point.
- Unincorporated community of Elmdale.

== Cemeteries ==
The township contains the following cemeteries:

- Cedar Point.
- Drinkwater.
- Montgomery.
