= Clements Stone Arch Bridge =

Historic bridge in Kansas, United States

- U.S. National Register of Historic Places
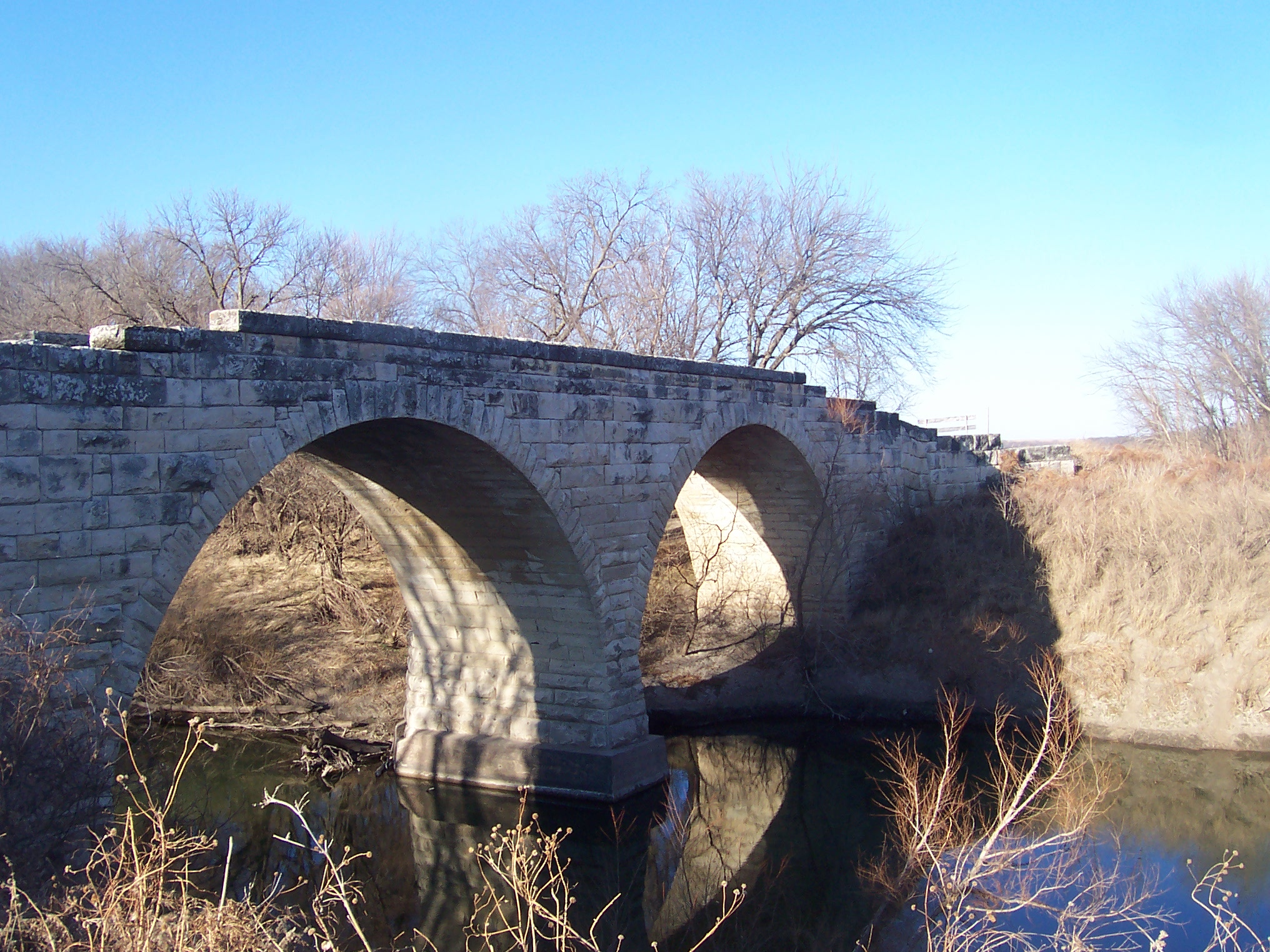

- Location within Kansas
- Nearest city: Clements, Kansas
- Coordinates: 38°17′42″N 96°44′05″W
- Area: less than one acre
- Built: 1886
- Built by: L. P. Santy & Co.
- NRHP reference No.: 76000816
- Added to NRHP: December 12, 1976

The Clements Stone Arch Bridge is a historic bridge across the Cottonwood River .5 miles (0.80 km) southeast of Clements, Kansas. The bridge was built in 1886 by L. P. Santy and Company of Clements, who contracted with the Chase County commission to build it for $12,000. The 175-foot (53 m) bridge is composed of two stone arches rising 40 feet (12 m) above the river. The stone used for the bridge was quarried in Clements, as Santy and Co. also operated a quarry; the use of local materials allows the bridge to match its natural surroundings. The bridge's nomination to the National Register of Historic Places described it as "a masterpiece of design and stone construction" and "one of the most handsome bridges in the state".

The bridge was added to the National Register of Historic Places on December 12, 1976.
