= Fox Creek Stone Arch Bridge =

- U.S. National Register of Historic Places
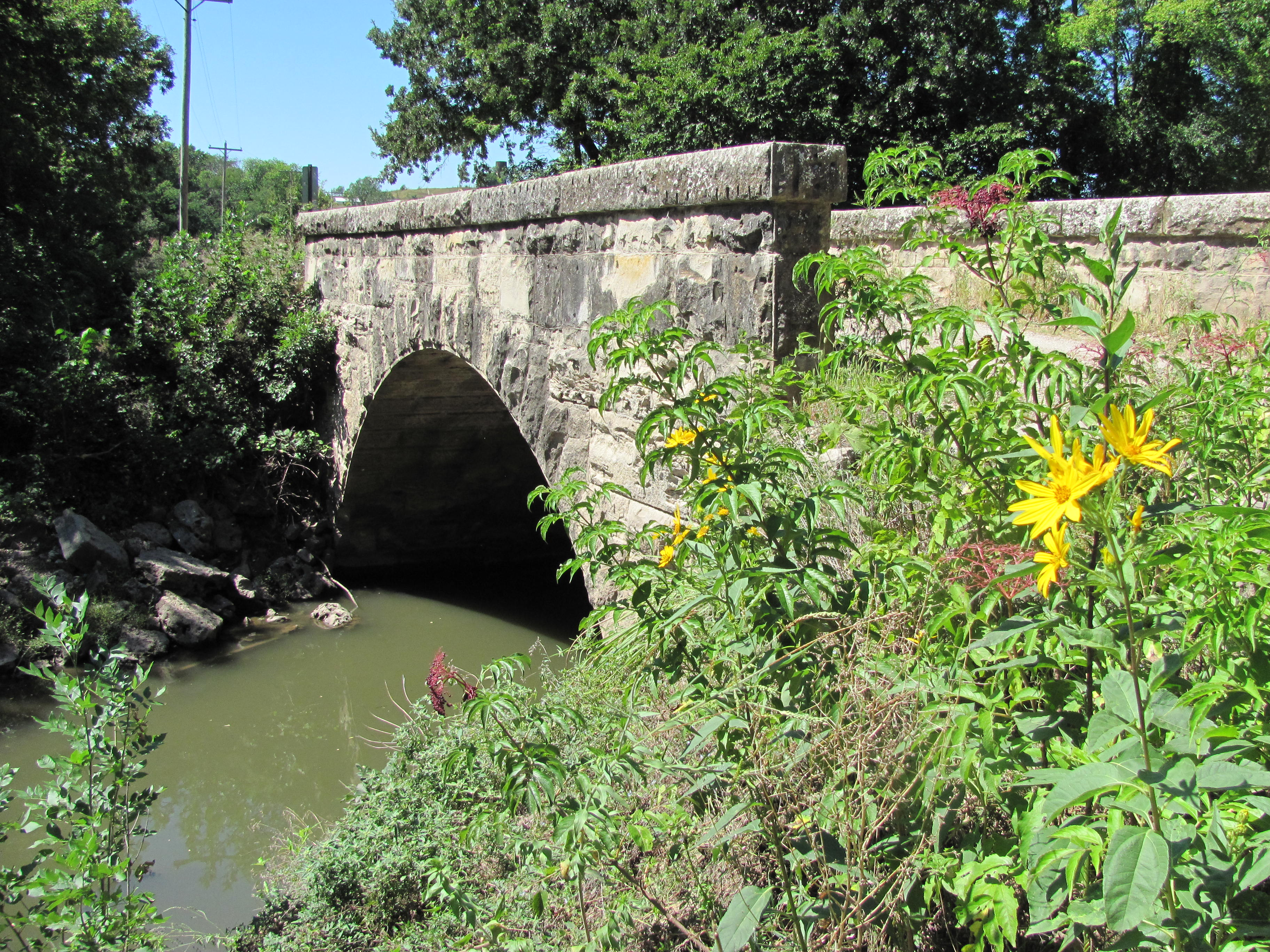

- Location within Kansas Location within the United States
- Nearest city: Strong City, Kansas
- Coordinates: 38°24′08″N 96°32′54″W
- Area: less than one acre
- Built: 1898
- Built by: B. Lantry & Sons
- Architectural style: stone arch bridge
- MPS: Masonry Arch Bridges of Kansas TR
- NRHP reference No.: 06001164
- Added to NRHP: December 27, 2006

The Fox Creek Stone Arch Bridge is a historic bridge across Fox Creek northwest of Strong City in Chase County, Kansas. The bridge was built in 1898 by B. Landry and Sons, who contracted with the Chase County government to build it for $2,000. The company built the bridge using limestone from a local quarry and arranged it in a single stone arch. The bridge is 55 feet (17 m) long and 20 feet (6.1 m) wide. It has carried county road traffic since its opening and is also part of the Community Connection Trail, which links Strong City with Tallgrass Prairie National Preserve.

The bridge was added to the National Register of Historic Places on December 27, 2006.
