= Strong Township, Kansas =

Strong Township
- Township
- Location within Chase County

- Location within the state of Kansas
- Coordinates: 38°26′55″N 096°31′41″W
- Country: United States
- State: Kansas
- County: Chase

Area
  - Total: 66.71 sq mi (172.78 km^{2})
  - Land: 66.55 sq mi (172.36 km^{2})
  - Water: 0.16 sq mi (0.42 km^{2}) 0.24%
- Elevation: 1,385 ft (422 m)

Population (2020)
  - Total: 507
  - Density: 7.62/sq mi (2.94/km^{2})
- GNIS feature ID: 0477166

Strong Township is a township in Chase County, Kansas, United States. As of the 2020 census, its population was 507.

== Geography ==
Strong Township covers an area of 66.71 square miles (172.8 km^{2}). The streams of Fox Creek, Indian Creek, Palmer Creek and Prather Creek run through this township.

== Communities ==
The township contains the following settlements:

- City of Strong City.

== Cemeteries ==
The township contains the following cemeteries:

- Saint Anthony.
- Simmons.
- Strong Township.
