= Matfield Green, Kansas =

City in Chase County, Kansas

- City
- Location within Chase County and Kansas

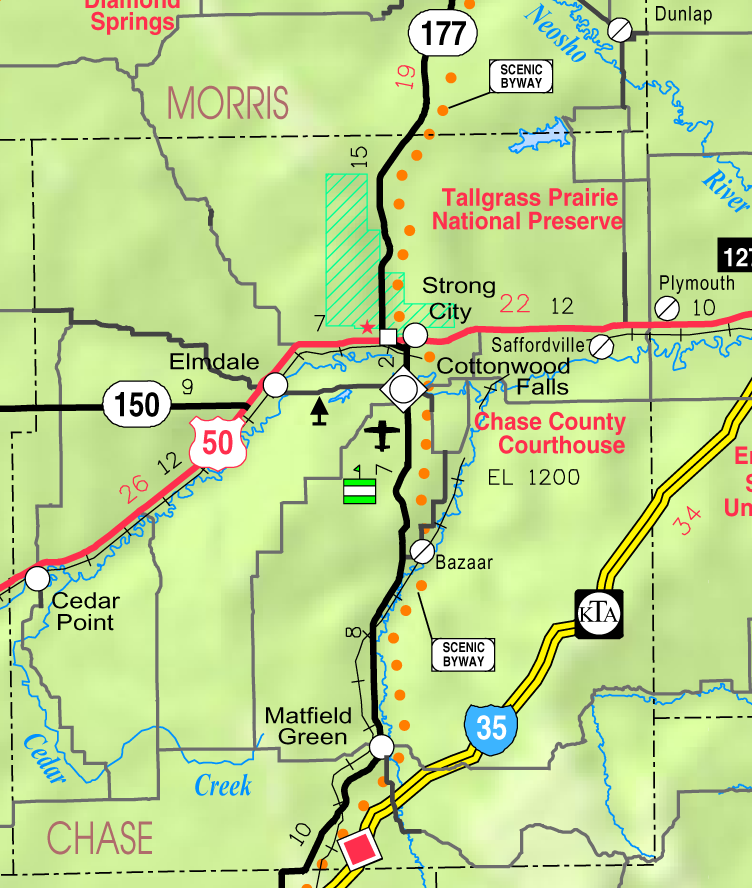
- KDOT map of Chase County (legend)
- Coordinates: 38°9′35″N 96°33′43″W
- Country: United States
- State: Kansas
- County: Chase
- Township: Matfield
- Incorporated: 1924
- Named for: Matfield, England

Government
  - Type: Mayor–Council

Area
  - Total: 0.14 sq mi (0.37 km^{2})
  - Land: 0.14 sq mi (0.37 km^{2})
  - Water: 0 sq mi (0.00 km^{2})
- Elevation: 1,306 ft (398 m)

Population (2020)
  - Total: 49
  - Density: 340/sq mi (130/km^{2})
- Time zone: UTC-6 (CST)
  - Summer (DST): UTC-5 (CDT)
- ZIP Code: 66862
- Area code: 620
- FIPS code: 20-45150
- GNIS ID: 477807

Matfield Green is a city in Chase County, Kansas, United States. As of the 2020 census, the population of the city was 49. It is located along K-177 highway.

== History ==
=== Early history ===
For many millennia, the Great Plains of North America was inhabited by nomadic Native Americans. The historic Native American tribes of Kansas are many, including the Kansa, or "Wind People," from whom the name of the state is derived. Also included are the related Osage, Pawnee, and Wichita. From the west and north ranged the Comanche and Apache, as well as the Kiowa, Cheyenne and Arapaho.

From the 16th century to 18th century, the Kingdom of France claimed ownership of large parts of North America. In 1762, after the French and Indian War, France secretly ceded New France to Spain, per the Treaty of Fontainebleau.

=== 19th century ===
In 1802, Spain returned most of the land to France. In 1803, most of the land for modern day Kansas was acquired by the United States from France as part of the 828,000 square mile Louisiana Purchase for 2.83 cents per acre.

In 1854, the Kansas Territory was organized, then in 1861 Kansas became the 34th U.S. state. In 1859, Chase County was established within the Kansas Territory, which included the land for modern day Matfield Green.

Matfield Green was named after Matfield, in England. The village green at Matfield in Kent is known as Matfield Green.

In 1870, Bazaar Township, Chase County, Kansas, which included Matfield Green at the time, had a population of 376, growing to 1,096 by 1880. In its heyday, at the beginning of the 20th century, Matfield Green grew to about 350 residents and possessed a bank, grocery store, livery and blacksmith, hardware, flour mill and lumberyard, and even a hotel for visitors. It also had its own schools. A post office existed in Matfield Green from January 11, 1867 to September 30, 1995.

=== Present ===
Like many small towns in Kansas, Matfield Green struggles to maintain its existence. It is helped by a small colony of artists and writers who work to preserve the community, along with the nearby historic Pioneer Bluffs ranch headquarters. Additionally great conservation efforts have been made by both private individuals such as Texas billionaire Ed Bass and non profit organizations Nature Conservancy to combat development and preserve the Flint Hills, which is one of the most threatened ecosystems in the world.

== Geography ==
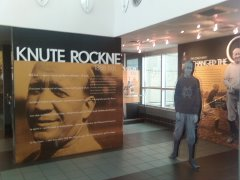
Knute Rockne memorial at Kansas Turnpike Authority rest stop (2009)

Matfield Green is located at 38°09′35″N 96°33′43″W (38.159609, -96.562013), in the scenic Flint Hills of the Great Plains, and located within the boundary of the Matfield Township. According to the United States Census Bureau, the city has a total area of 0.14 square miles (0.36 km^{2}), all land.

=== Climate ===
The climate in this area is characterized by hot, humid summers and generally mild to cool winters. According to the Köppen Climate Classification system, Matfield Green has a humid subtropical climate, abbreviated "Cfa" on climate maps.

== Area attractions ==
Matfield Green has two ranches on the National Register of Historic Places (NRHP): Crocker Ranch (NRHP). 1908-1940 Pioneer Bluffs Ranch (NRHP), approximately one mile north on K-177 Highway. Pioneer Bluffs is an early twentieth century ranch, consisting of one dozen vintage farm buildings.

== Demographics ==
Historical population
Census	Pop.	Note	%±
1880	324		—
1930	182		—
1940	146		−19.8%
1950	119		−18.5%
1960	95		−20.2%
1970	77		−18.9%
1980	71		−7.8%
1990	33		−53.5%
2000	60		81.8%
2010	47		−21.7%
2020	49		4.3%
U.S. Decennial Census

Matfield Green is part of the Emporia Micropolitan Statistical Area.

=== 2020 census ===
The 2020 United States census counted 49 people, 28 households, and 17 families in Matfield Green. The population density was 345.1 per square mile (133.2/km^{2}). There were 37 housing units at an average density of 260.6 per square mile (100.6/km^{2}). The racial makeup was 95.92% (47) white or European American (95.92% non-Hispanic white), 0.0% (0) black or African-American, 0.0% (0) Native American or Alaska Native, 0.0% (0) Asian, 0.0% (0) Pacific Islander or Native Hawaiian, 4.08% (2) from other races, and 0.0% (0) from two or more races. Hispanic or Latino of any race was 0.0% (0) of the population.

Of the 28 households, 17.9% had children under the age of 18; 50.0% were married couples living together; 14.3% had a female householder with no spouse or partner present. 39.3% of households consisted of individuals and 7.1% had someone living alone who was 65 years of age or older. The average household size was 2.0 and the average family size was 3.6.

22.4% of the population was under the age of 18, 2.0% from 18 to 24, 14.3% from 25 to 44, 40.8% from 45 to 64, and 20.4% who were 65 years of age or older. The median age was 47.9 years. For every 100 females, there were 88.5 males. For every 100 females ages 18 and older, there were 81.0 males.

=== 2010 census ===
As of the census of 2010, there were 47 people, 24 households, and 11 families residing in the city. The population density was 335.7 inhabitants per square mile (129.6/km^{2}). There were 36 housing units at an average density of 257.1 per square mile (99.3/km^{2}). The racial makeup of the city was 100.0% White.

There were 24 households, of which 16.7% had children under the age of 18 living with them, 41.7% were married couples living together, 4.2% had a male householder with no wife present, and 54.2% were non-families. 37.5% of all households were made up of individuals, and 16.6% had someone living alone who was 65 years of age or older. The average household size was 1.96 and the average family size was 2.73.

The median age in the city was 58.8 years. 17% of residents were under the age of 18; 0.0% were between the ages of 18 and 24; 12.8% were from 25 to 44; 34.1% were from 45 to 64; and 36.2% were 65 years of age or older. The gender makeup of the city was 51.1% male and 48.9% female.

== Government ==
The Matfield Green government consists of a mayor and five council members. The council meets the 1st Monday of each month at 7PM.

- City Hall, 302 Orient Street.

== Education ==
The community is served by Chase County USD 284 public school district. It has two schools.

- Chase County Junior/Senior High School, 600 Main St in Cottonwood Falls.
- Chase County Elementary School, 401 Maple St in Cottonwood Falls.

Matfield Green schools were closed through school unification. The Matfield Green High School mascot was Matfield Green Panthers.

== Infrastructure ==
=== Transportation ===
K-177 highway and Southern Transcon main line of BNSF Railway both pass through Matfield Green. The Kansas Turnpike toll road is close to Matfield Green, but a driver must exit the toll plaza in Cassoday and enter K-177 (Kansas highway) going north.

=== Utilities ===
- Internet
  - Satellite Internet is provided by HughesNet, StarBand, WildBlue.
- TV
  - Satellite TV is provided by DirecTV, Dish Network.
  - Free over-the-air ATSC digital TV.

== See also ==
- National Register of Historic Places listings in Chase County, Kansas
