= Cottonwood River Bridge =

- U.S. National Register of Historic Places
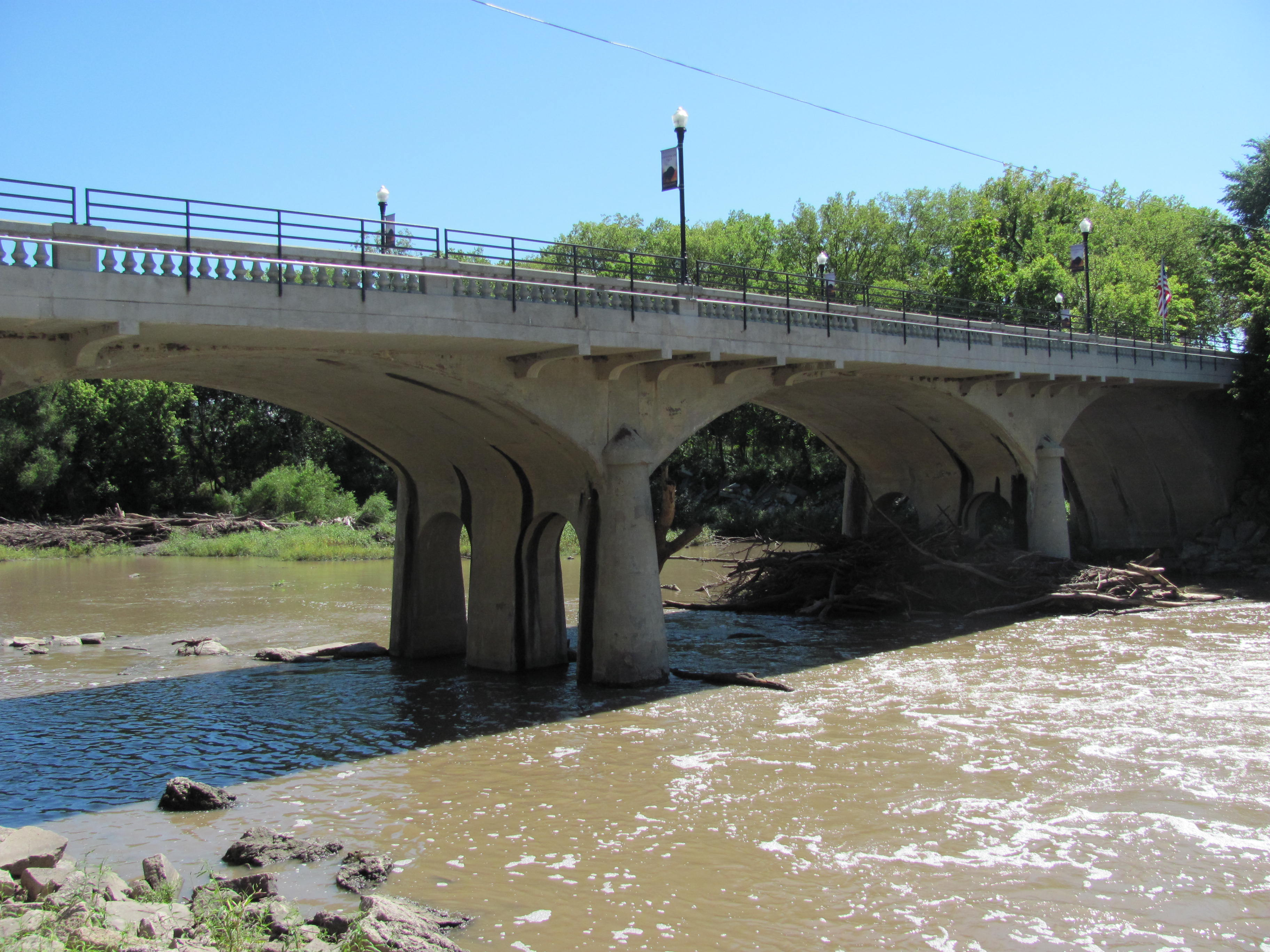

- Location within Kansas
- Location: K-177, N edge of Cottonwood Falls, Cottonwood Falls, Kansas
- Coordinates: 38°22′30″N 96°32′26″W
- Area: less than one acre
- Built: 1914
- Built by: Missouri Valley Bridge & Iron Co.
- Architectural style: Filled Spandrel
- MPS: Masonry Arch Bridges of Kansas TR
- NRHP reference No.: 85001422
- Added to NRHP: July 2, 1985

The Cottonwood River Bridge is a historic bridge across the Cottonwood River at the north edge of Cottonwood Falls, Kansas. The bridge was built in 1914 by the Missouri Valley Bridge and Iron Company, who bid $13,700 for its contract. It is 207 feet (63 m) long and rises 25.5 feet (7.8 m) above the river. Lead builder F. L. Rice used a concrete spandrel arch plan for the bridge, a contemporary design which has since fallen out of use. The bridge is currently closed to vehicle traffic and is used as a fishing site for a local park.

The bridge was added to the National Register of Historic Places on July 2, 1985.
