= Falls Township, Chase County, Kansas =

Falls Township
- Township
- Location within Chase County

- Location within the state of Kansas
- Coordinates: 38°20′30″N 096°31′46″W
- Country: United States
- State: Kansas
- County: Chase

Area
  - Total: 50.72 sq mi (131.37 km^{2})
  - Land: 50.51 sq mi (130.83 km^{2})
  - Water: 0.21 sq mi (0.55 km^{2}) 0.42%
- Elevation: 1,296 ft (395 m)

Population (2000)
  - Total: 1,163
  - Density: 23/sq mi (8.9/km^{2})
- GNIS feature ID: 0477270

Falls Township is a township in Chase County, Kansas, United States. As of the 2000 census, its population was 1,163.

== Geography ==
Falls Township covers an area of 50.72 square miles (131.4 km^{2}). The streams of Buck Creek, South Fork Cottonwood River, Spring Creek and Stout Run run through this township.

== Communities ==
The township contains the following settlements:

- City of Cottonwood Falls.

== Cemeteries ==
The township contains the following cemeteries:

- Miller.
- Prairie Grove.

== Transportation ==
Falls Township contains one airport or landing strip, Chase County Airport.
