= Matfield Township, Kansas =

Matfield Township
- Township
- Location within Chase County

- Location within the state of Kansas
- Coordinates: 38°08′40″N 096°29′36″W
- Country: United States
- State: Kansas
- County: Chase

Area
  - Total: 122.43 sq mi (317.08 km^{2})
  - Land: 122.07 sq mi (316.16 km^{2})
  - Water: 0.36 sq mi (0.92 km^{2}) 0.29%
- Elevation: 1,424 ft (434 m)

Population (2000)
  - Total: 155
  - Density: 1.3/sq mi (0.5/km^{2})
- GNIS feature ID: 0477823

Matfield Township is a township in Chase County, Kansas, United States. As of the 2000 census, its population was 155.

== Geography ==
Matfield Township covers an area of 122.42 square miles (317.1 km^{2}). The streams of Bull Creek, Camp Creek, Corn Creek, Crocker Creek, Jack Creek, Little Cedar Creek, Mercer Creek, Shaw Creek, Steak Bake Creek and Thurman Creek run through this township.

== Communities ==
The township contains the following settlements:

- City of Matfield Green.
- Ghost town of Thurman.

== Cemeteries ==
The township contains the following cemeteries:

- High Prairie.
- Matfield Green.
