= Clover Cliff Ranch House =

Historic house in Kansas, United States

- U.S. National Register of Historic Places
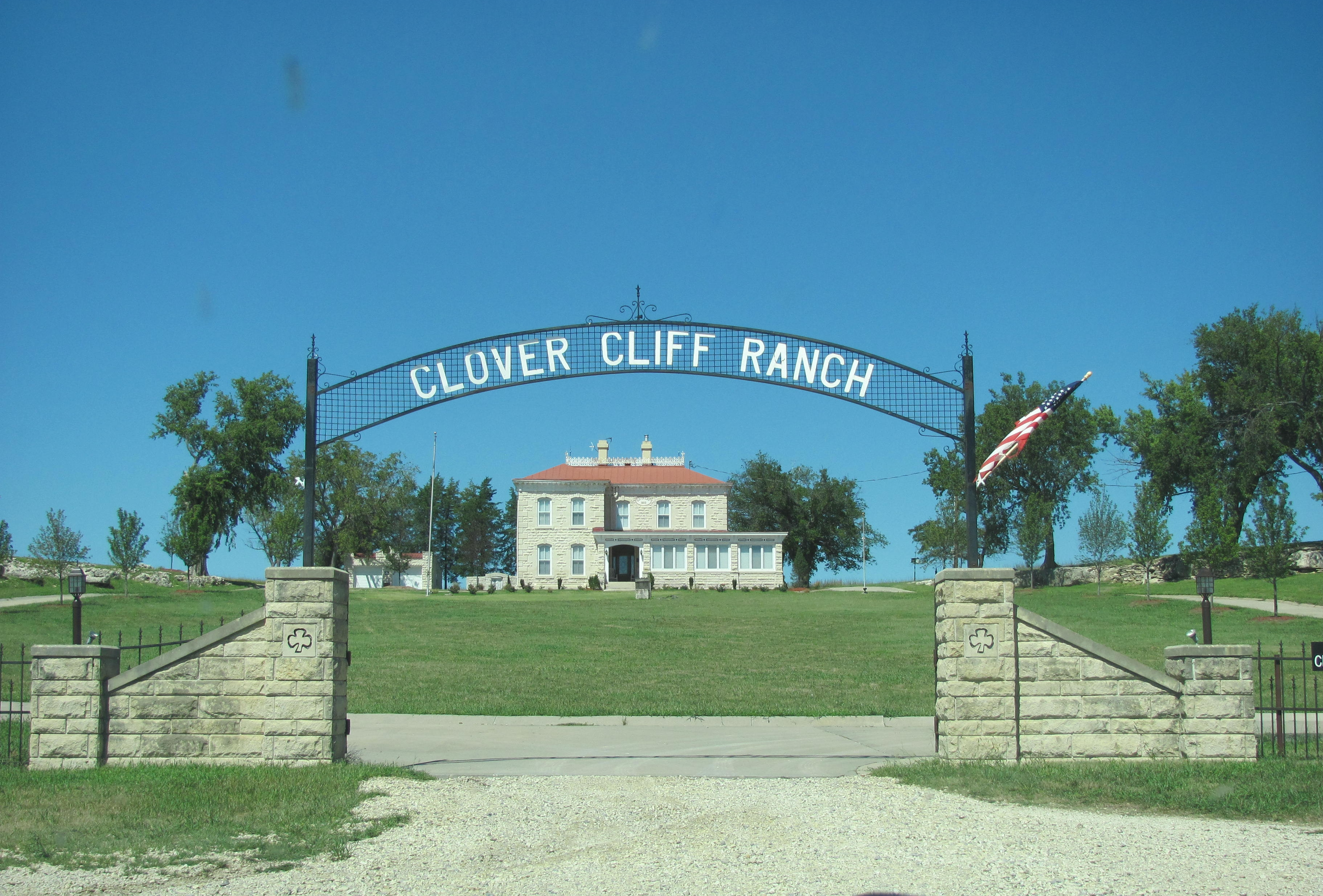

- Location within Kansas
- Nearest city: Elmdale, Kansas
- Coordinates: 38°19′55″N 96°41′47″W
- Area: 2 acres (0.81 ha)
- Built: 1883
- Built by: J. R. Blackshere
- NRHP reference No.: 77000574
- Added to NRHP: November 9, 1977

The Clover Cliff Ranch House is a historic house on U.S. Route 50 4 miles (6.4 km) southwest of Elmdale, Kansas. While the oldest portion of the house dates to the 1860s, the majority of it was built in 1883 by Jacob Ramer Blackshere. A West Virginia native who settled in Kansas in the 1860s, Blackshere experimented with farming different crops in his new home; he became one of the first large-scale alfalfa farmers in the state. He was also active in local Democratic Party politics, serving as county commissioner for two years, and helped found the Chase County National Bank. The house has an Italian Villa-inspired design with a rough stone exterior, smooth stone quoins along the edges and windows, and an entablature and frieze along the hipped roof. Blackshere lived in the house until his death in 1894, and the house remained in his family until his wife's death in 1911. The Prather family, who purchased the house from Blackshere's son, enlarged the house's front porch and added its back porch.

The house was added to the National Register of Historic Places on November 9, 1977.
