= Homestead Township, Kansas =

Homestead Township
- Township
- Location within Chase County

- Location within the state of Kansas
- Coordinates: 38°09′30″N 096°41′41″W
- Country: United States
- State: Kansas
- County: Chase

Area
  - Total: 54.64 sq mi (141.51 km^{2})
  - Land: 54.49 sq mi (141.12 km^{2})
  - Water: 0.15 sq mi (0.38 km^{2}) 0.27%
- Elevation: 1,430 ft (440 m)

Population (2000)
  - Total: 52
  - Density: 1/sq mi (0.39/km^{2})
- GNIS feature ID: 0477799

Homestead Township is a township in Chase County, Kansas, United States. As of the 2000 census, its population was 52.

== Geography ==
Homestead Township covers an area of 54.64 square miles (141.5 km^{2}).

== History ==
A post office under the name Homestead opened in 1876 and was discontinued in 1913.

== Communities ==
The township contains the following settlements:

- Ghost town of Homestead.

== Cemeteries ==
The township contains the following cemeteries:

- Homestead.
