= K-177 (Kansas highway) =

State highway in Kansas, U.S.

K-177
- K-177 highlighted in red

Route information
- Maintained by KDOT and the cities of Council Grove, and Manhattan
- Length: 102.871 mi (165.555 km)
- Tourist routes: Flint Hills Scenic Byway

Major junctions
- South end: US-54 east of El Dorado
- I-35 / Kansas Turnpike in Cassoday; US-50 near Strong City; US-56 in Council Grove; K-4 along the Morris–Wabaunsee county line near Alta Vista; I-70 / US-40 in northeast Geary County; K-18 in Manhattan
- North end: US-24 in Manhattan

Location
- Country: United States
- State: Kansas
- Counties: Butler, Chase, Morris, Wabaunsee, Geary, Riley

Highway system
- Kansas State Highway System; Interstate; US; State; Spurs
← US-177	→ K-178

K-177 is a 102.871-mile-long (165.555 km) south–north state highway in central Kansas. It runs from U.S. Route 54 (US-54) near El Dorado northward to US-24 in Manhattan, passing through the Flint Hills. It is part of the Flint Hills Scenic Byway and the Prairie Parkway.

== Route description ==
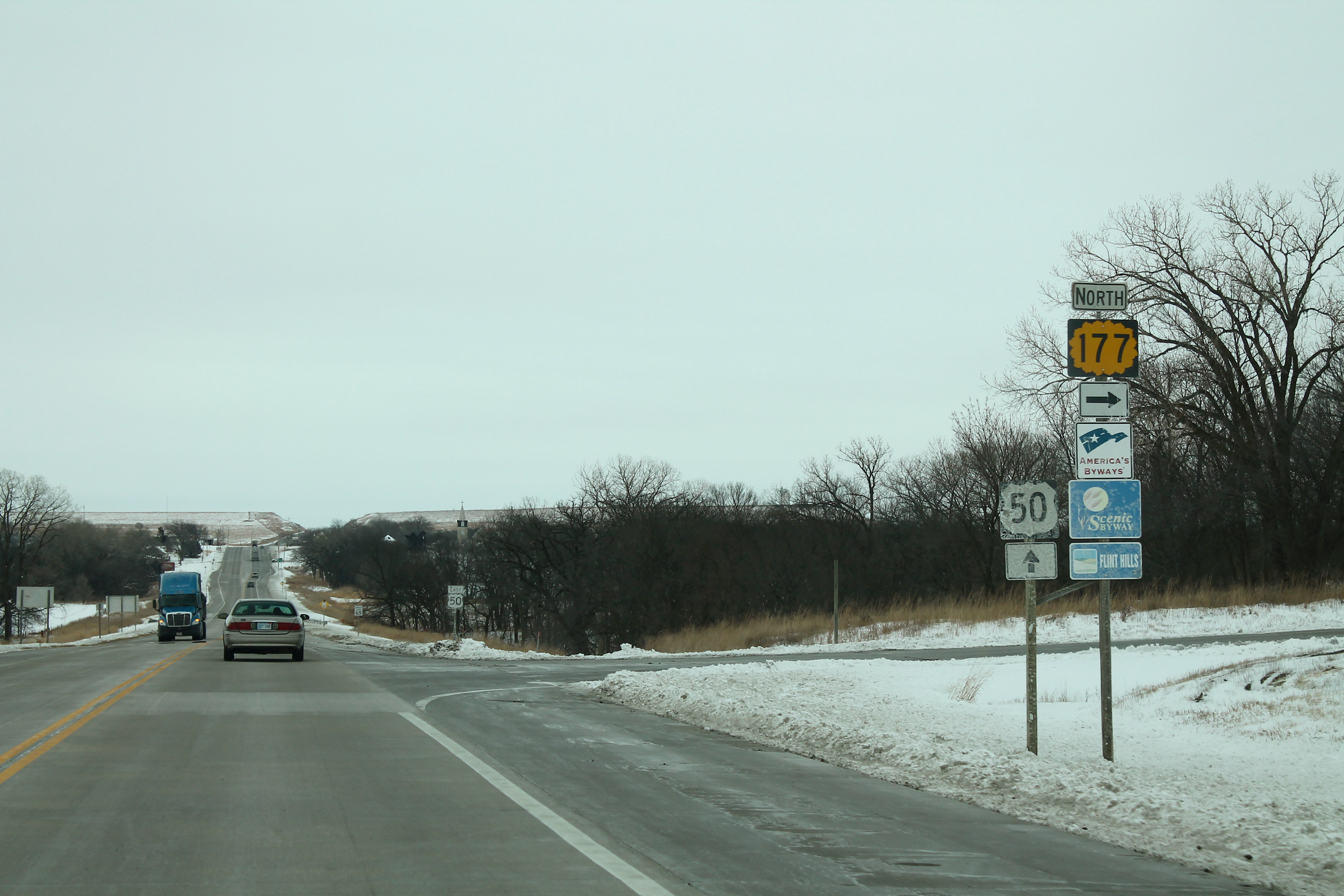
US-50 at its junction with the ramp for K-177 northbound

From its beginnings at US-54 east of El Dorado, K-177 heads northward for .3 miles (0.48 km) then crosses Bird Creek. The highway then curves northeast and travels about .8 miles (1.3 km) then curves back north. It continues about .7 miles (1.1 km) then begins to cross the Bemis Creek leg of El Dorado Lake, providing access to El Dorado Lake along the way. It continues north for 1.8 miles (2.9 km) then crosses the Satchel Creek leg of El Dorado Lake. K-177 continues another 2.6 miles (4.2 km) then crosses Durechen Creek. The highway then crosses a BNSF Railway track, then curves northeast and begins to parallel it along with I-35 and Kansas Turnpike. The highway continues northeast then enters the city of Cassoday. In the city, the highway turns north at junction with Stony Creek Road. K-177 continues north through the city before exiting the city at a junction with Sunbarger Street. As it exits the city it crosses Walnut Creek then reaches an interchange with I-35 and KTA at exit 92. K-177 continues north for 2.6 miles (4.2 km) then reaches the Chase County line, where it curves north and begins to parallel it. After one mile (1.6 km) it curves northeast into the county.

Into the county it begins to parallel the BNSF Railway again, then crosses it and curves north. The highway soon crosses Jack Creek then curves northeast. The highway continues northeast between the railway and Mercer Creek. K-177 curves north at road and enters the city of Matfield Green as Reed Street. It soon exits the city and continues about .5 miles (0.80 km) past the city then curves northwest. The highway curves back north and crosses Crocker Creek. It continues north through the unincorporated community of Rural. About 1.5 miles (2.4 km) past Rural, K-177 crosses Kirk Creek. The highway then runs alongside South Fork Cottonwood River for about .4 miles (0.64 km), as it crosses Nickel Creek. K-177 then crosses the railway and then curves northeast after about .5 miles (0.80 km). Continues for two miles (3.2 km) along the railway then curves northward. The highway then crosses Rock Creek and passes to the west of the unincorporated community of Bazaar. Over the next 3.5 miles (5.6 km) the highway goes through a series of curves then straightens out as it continues north. K-177 crosses Buck Creek, then enters the city of Cottonwood Falls as Walnut Street at a junction with 8th Street and Findley Street. The highway continues north then crosses the Cottonwood River as it exits the city. It continues north for .6 miles (0.97 km) then enters Strong City as Cottonwood Street and continues north. It then crosses a BNSF Railway then turns west onto 4th Street. It exits the city then crosses Fox Creek and reaches an interchange with US-50 as it curves north. K-177 continues north through 2.3 miles (3.7 km) through Tallgrass Prairie National Preserve. It exits the preserve and continues north through a series of curves then turns northeast. It continues for about two miles (3.2 km) then enters into Morris County.

About one mile (1.6 km) into the county, the highway curves north. After about 2.5 miles (4.0 km) it curves northeastward and follows to the east of Spring Creek. K-177 curves more northward and crosses Fourmile Creek then intersects 4 Mile Road. It continues north for about 2.8 miles (4.5 km) then enters the city of Council Grove as Neosho Street. The highway then curves northwest as it crosses Elm Creek. K-177 then reaches a junction with US-56, also known as Main Street. Here K-177 turns east anb begins to follow US-56 as the two cross the Neosho River. K-177 then turns north onto Union Street and US-56 continues east. It exits the city and begins to run along the east shore of Council Grove Lake. It then crosses Munkers Creek as it passes by the north end of the lake. The highway continues north for 4.5 miles (7.2 km) then intersects G Avenue. It continues north for two miles (3.2 km) and begins to parallel the Morris–Wabaunsee county line. After another one mile (1.6 km) it intersects and begins to overlap K-4. The two highways continue north for one mile (1.6 km) then K-4 turns east toward K-99. K-177 curves northwest and crosses a Union Pacific Railway. It then crosses West Branch Mill Creek then enters into Geary County. Roughly .5 miles (0.80 km) into county, K-177 curves north then intersects. It continues for about six miles (9.7 km) then intersects Schendman Road. After about 1.8 miles (2.9 km) it curves northwest, then curves back north after 1.3 miles (2.1 km). The highway then crosses Deadman Creek as it continues north. After 2.5 miles (4.0 km) it reaches an interchange with I-70 and US-40 at exit 313. Here K-177 becomes a 4-lane expressway as it continues north, then enters into Riley County. It continues north into the county and after about six miles (9.7 km) begins to curve to the northwest then intersects K-18. Here K-177 turns west and begins to follow K-18. The two highways cross the Kansas River and enter the city of Manhattan. Just inside the city, the two highways split and K-177 heads north. K-177 soon ends at a junction with US-24.

Flint Hills Scenic Byway is a portion of K-177 located in the Flint Hills region of the state, stretching from Interstate 35 at Cassoday north to US-56 at Council Grove. Along the byway there are rolling hills and some of the only tallgrass prairie left in North America. It is a National Scenic Byway. The section of K-177 from I-70 north to K-18 is part of the Native Stone Scenic Byway.

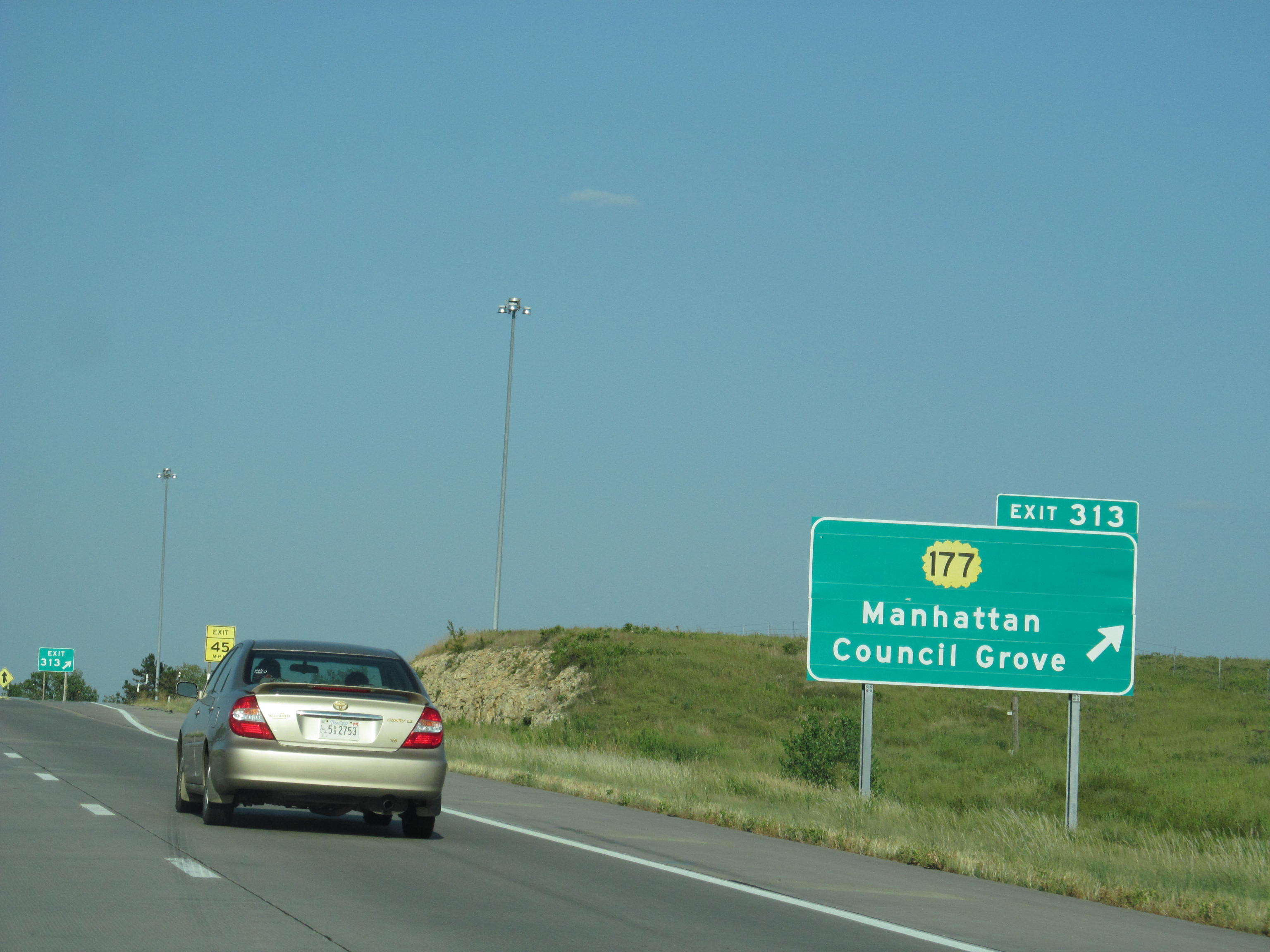
I-70 at exit for K-177

From I-70 to US-24, K-177 is named the Coach Bill Snyder Highway, in honor of the long-time Kansas State University football coach.

K-177 is two lanes from US-54 to I-70 and a four-lane expressway from I-70 to US-24.

The Kansas Department of Transportation (KDOT) tracks the traffic levels on its highways, and in 2018, they determined that on average the traffic varied from 280 vehicles per day slightly southeast of Cassoday to just over 13200 vehicles per day between K-18 and US-24. The second highest was the section between I-70/US-40 and K-18 which was between 7540 and 8720 vehicles per day. The section of K-177 from I-70 and US-40 to the northern terminus is part of the National Highway System. The National Highway System is a system of highways important to the nation's defense, economy, and mobility. K-177 also connects to the National Highway System at its southern terminus (US-54), and its junctions with I-35 by Cassoday and US-50 by Strong City. All but 1.847 miles (2.972 km) of K-177's alignment is maintained by KDOT. The entire section of K-177 within Council Grove is maintained by the city. The .312-mile (0.502 km) section of K-177 in Manhattan from K-18 north to the northern terminus is maintained by the city.

== History ==
K-177 was signed as K-13 until 1965. It previously ended at US-77 before El Dorado Lake was completed.

K-213
- Location: NW of Manhattan–Randolph
- Length: 5.708 mi (9.186 km)
- Existed: January 14, 1957–April 8, 1964

K-213 began at K-13 and began travelling northwest, paralleling the Union Pacific Railroad and Big Blue River. After just over 2 miles (3.2 km), the highway curved to the north. It continued north then entered the city of Randolph, where it intersected US-77 and K-16. On January 14, 1957, K-213 was established from K-13, where it turned east and crossed the Big Blue River, north to Randolph. In an April 8, 1964 resolution, K-13's southern terminus was truncated to Manhattan. At this time the section of K-13 from El Dorado to K-213, along with K-213 was redesignated as K-177.

Approved in early 2019, it was approved to reconstruct 24 miles (39 km) of K-177, from four miles (6.4 km) north of Council Grove to I-70. The project will increase the width of the roadway from 26 feet (7.9 m) to 40 feet (12 m) and will move certain sections to new alignments. The $25 million project is expected to be completed in 2020.

In September 2019, KDOT approved several projects along K-177 in Chase County. Three bridges will be replaced, including a $2.3 million bridge connecting K-177 to US-50 just west of Strong City, a $1.9 million bridge over Fox Creek, a $1.3 million bridge over a Fox Creek drainage area and a $436,000 bridge over Bloody Creek southeast of Cottonwood Falls.

On April 2, 2020, work began to replace the creek over Munkers Creek north of Council Grove. The $4.7 million project being completed by Bridges Incorporated from Newton is expected to be completed by March 2021. Traffic was reduced to one lane of traffic during construction.

== Junction list ==
County	Location	mi	km	Destinations	Notes
Butler		0.000	0.000	US-54 – Eureka, El Dorado	Southern terminus
Butler	Cassoday	18.753	30.180	I-35 / Kansas Turnpike – Wichita, Emporia, Kansas City	I-35/KTA exit 92; beginning of Flint Hills Scenic Byway
Chase	Strong City	46.423	74.711	US-50 – Emporia, Florence	Interchange
Morris	Council Grove	65.662	105.673	US-56 west – Herington	Western end of US-56 concurrency; end of Flint Hills Scenic Byway
Morris	Council Grove	65.830	105.943	US-56 east – Osage City	Eastern end of US-56 concurrency
Morris–Wabaunsee county line		78.275	125.971	K-4 west – Dwight, White City	Southern end of K-4 concurrency
Morris–Wabaunsee county line		79.275	127.581	K-4 east – Alta Vista, Eskridge, Topeka	Northern end of K-4 concurrency; Topeka only signed southbound
Geary		94.249	151.679	I-70 / US-40 – Salina, Topeka	I-70 exit 313; partial cloverleaf interchange; beginning of Native Stone Scenic Byway
Riley		101.979	164.119	K-18 east (Native Stone Scenic Byway) – Zeandale, Wabaunsee	Southern end of K-18 concurrency; Native Stone Scenic Byway follows K-18
Riley	Manhattan	102.559	165.053	Pierre Street west	Interchange; northbound left exit and southbound left entrance
Riley	Manhattan	102.559	165.053	K-18 west (Fort Riley Boulevard)	Northern end of K-18 concurrency
Riley	Manhattan	102.871	165.555	US-24 – Clay Center, Wamego	Northern terminus; road continues as US 24 west (Tuttle Creek Boulevard)
1.000 mi = 1.609 km; 1.000 km = 0.621 mi: Concurrency terminus; Incomplete access; Tolled
