= Cottonwood River Pratt Truss Bridge =

- U.S. National Register of Historic Places
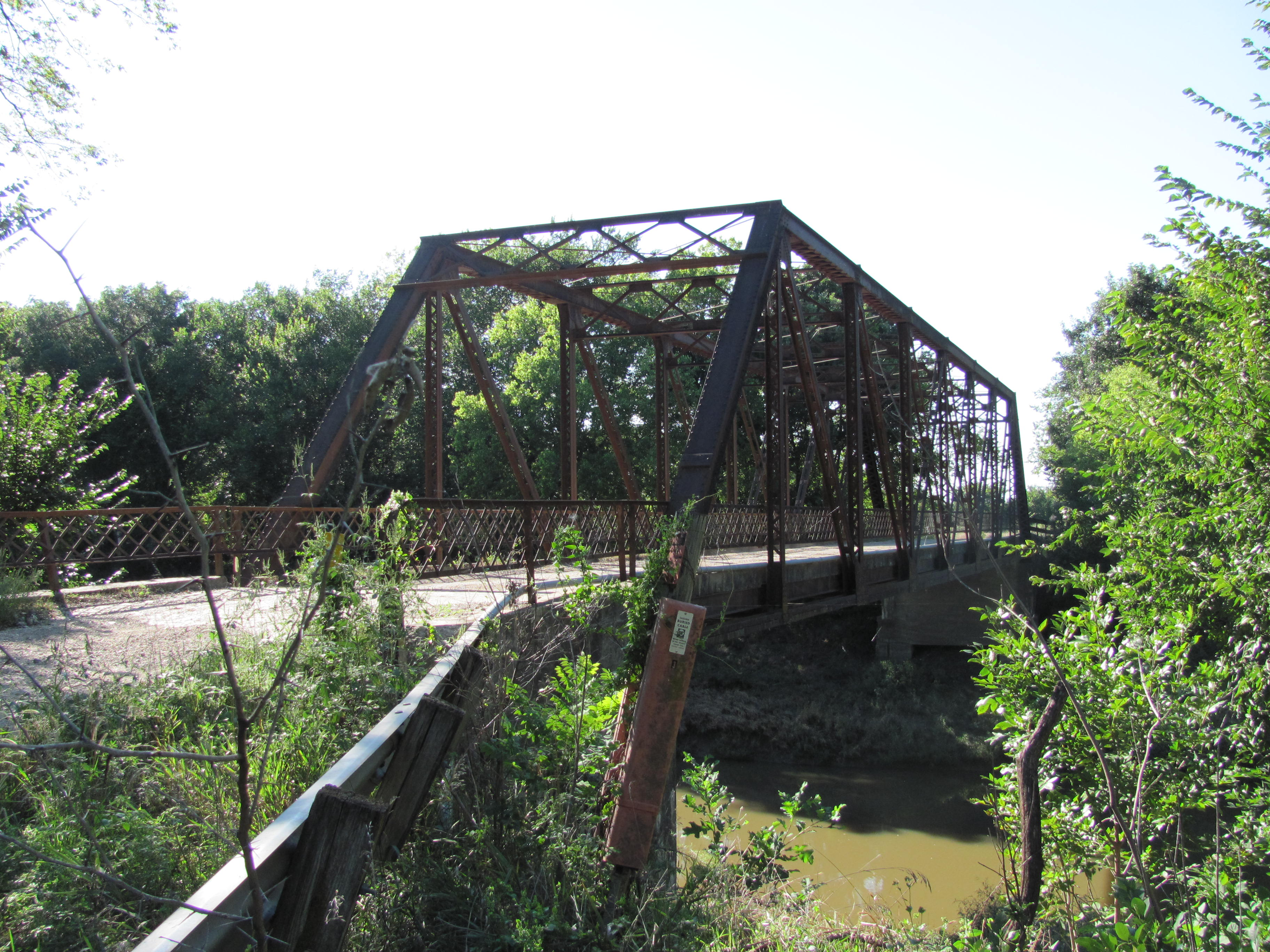

- Location within Kansas
- Location: Main Street, Cedar Point, Kansas
- Coordinates: 38°15′36″N 96°50′02″W
- Area: less than one acre
- Built: 1916
- Built by: Missouri Valley Bridge & Iron Co.
- Architectural style: Pratt Truss
- MPS: Metal Truss Bridges in Kansas 1861--1939 MPS
- NRHP reference No.: 03000376
- Added to NRHP: May 9, 2003

The Cottonwood River Pratt Truss Bridge is a historic bridge which carries Main Street across the Cottonwood River in Cedar Point, Kansas, USA. The single-span Pratt truss bridge was built in 1916 by the Missouri Valley Bridge and Iron Company. Locals proposed a bridge along a western extension of Main Street in 1914, but construction did not begin until late 1915 due to negotiations over its price; the county initially received no bids for the bridge after underestimating its cost, and it rejected every bid in the second round until the Missouri Valley Company dropped theirs to $8,750. The bridge is 142 feet (43 m) long, 17 feet (5.2 m) wide and is 32.5 feet (9.9 m) above the river. The Pratt truss design, with vertical and center-facing diagonal beams, was commonly used at the time due to its stability. The Cottonwood River bridge is one of roughly 800 examples of the type in Kansas.

The bridge was added to the National Register of Historic Places on May 9, 2003.
