= Elmdale, Kansas =

City in Chase County, Kansas

- City
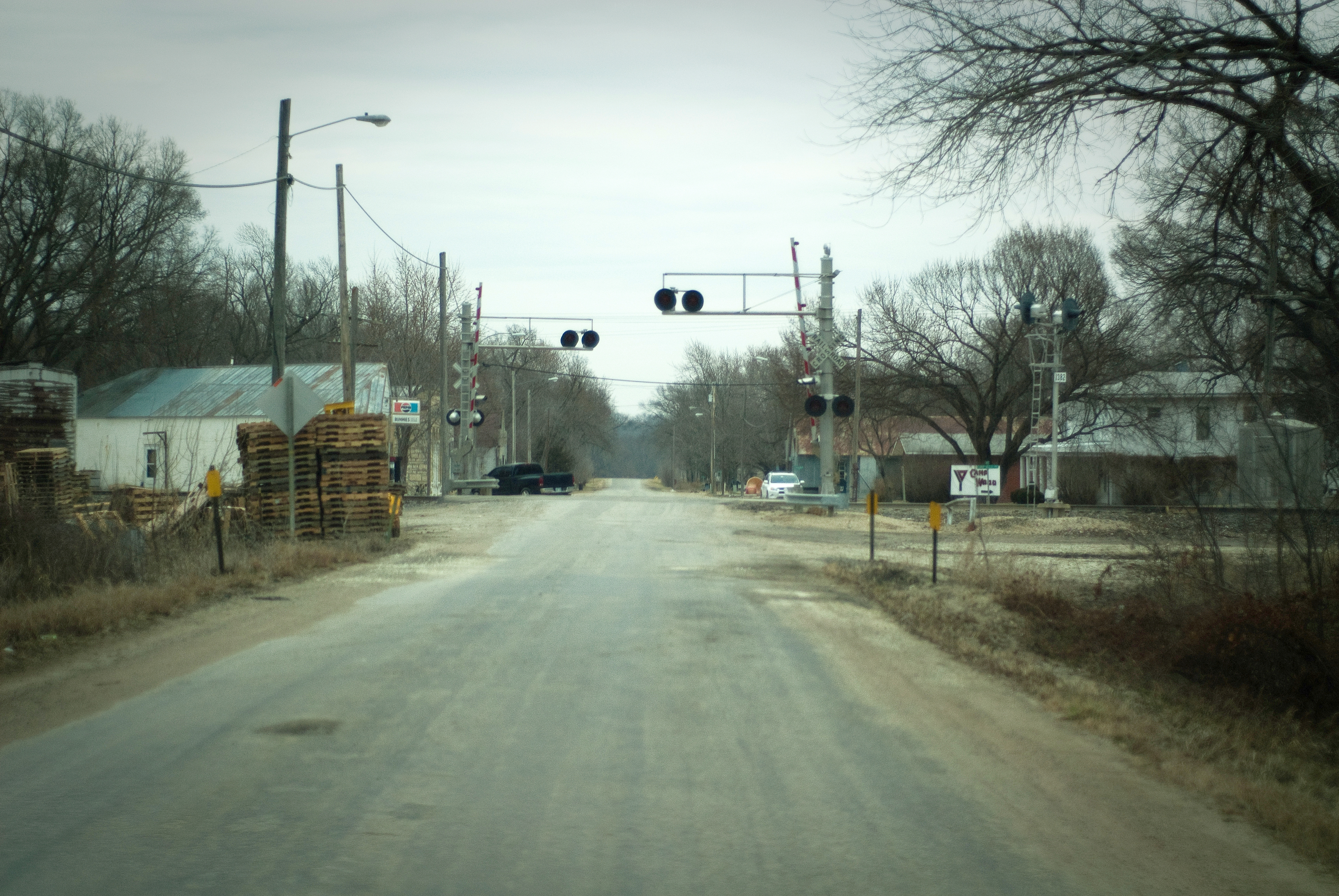
- Elmdale, 2011

- Location within Chase County and Kansas

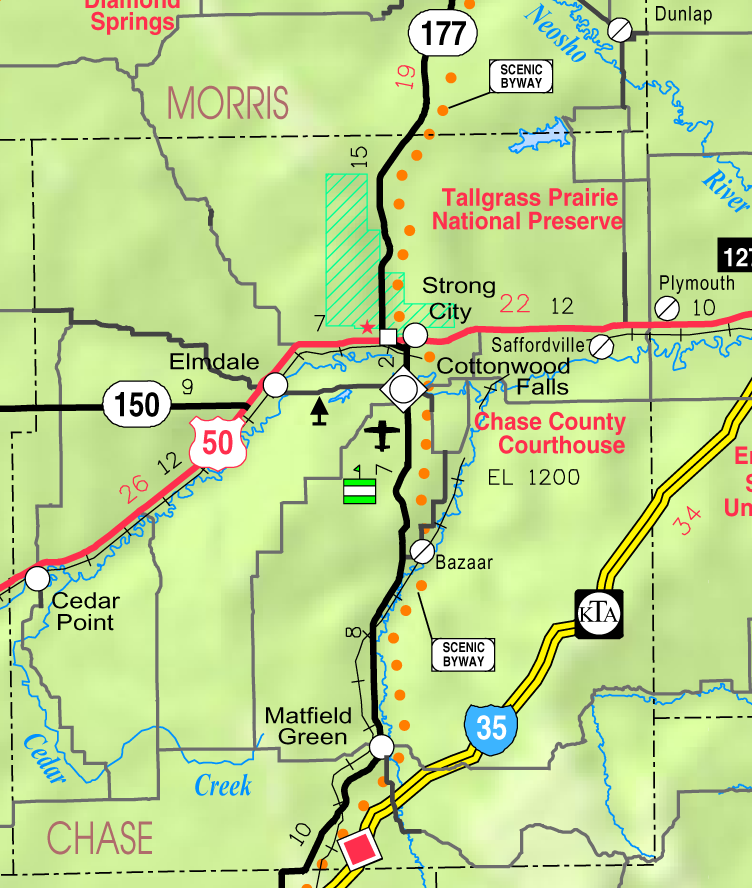
- KDOT map of Chase County (legend)
- Coordinates: 38°22′23″N 96°38′46″W
- Country: United States
- State: Kansas
- County: Chase
- Township: Diamond Creek
- Incorporated: 1899

Government
  - Type: Mayor–Council

Area
  - Total: 0.17 sq mi (0.43 km^{2})
  - Land: 0.17 sq mi (0.43 km^{2})
  - Water: 0 sq mi (0.00 km^{2})
- Elevation: 1,201 ft (366 m)

Population (2020)
  - Total: 40
  - Density: 240/sq mi (93/km^{2})
- Time zone: UTC-6 (CST)
  - Summer (DST): UTC-5 (CDT)
- ZIP Code: 66850
- Area code: 620
- FIPS code: 20-20675
- GNIS ID: 477256
- Website: cityofelmdale-ks.org

Elmdale is a city in Chase County, Kansas, United States. As of the 2020 census, the population of the city was 40. It is located along U.S. Route 50 highway.

== History ==
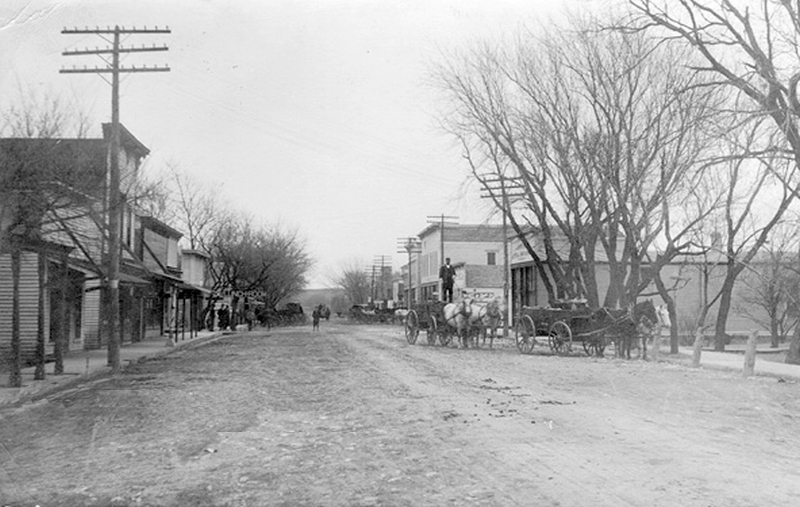
Main Street, 1911

In 1806, Zebulon Pike led the Pike Expedition westward from St Louis, Missouri, of which part of their journey followed the Cottonwood River through Chase County near the current city of Elmdale.

In 1854, the Kansas Territory was organized, then in 1861 Kansas became the 34th U.S. state. In 1859, Chase County was established within the Kansas Territory, which included the land for modern day Elmdale.

In 1871, the Atchison, Topeka and Santa Fe Railway built a main line east–west through Elmdale. In 1873, a post office was relocated from Middle Creek (an extinct town), to the rail community of Elmdale. Elmdale was incorporated in 1904.

In 1916, Camp Wood YMCA was built about 1.5 miles south of Elmdale.

There have been numerous floods during the history of Elmdale. In June and July 1951, due to heavy rains, rivers and streams flooded numerous cities in Kansas, including Elmdale. Many reservoirs and levees were built in Kansas as part of a response to the Great Flood of 1951. A levee was built and saved the town from numerous floods, but in 1998 a flood spilled over the levee.

== Geography ==
Elmdale is located in the Flint Hills of the Great Plains. According to the United States Census Bureau, the city has a total area of 0.17 square miles (0.44 km^{2}), all land. The Cottonwood River is approximately 0.5 mile east of the city.

=== Climate ===
The climate in this area is characterized by hot, humid summers and generally mild to cool winters. According to the Köppen Climate Classification system, Elmdale has a humid subtropical climate, abbreviated "Cfa" on climate maps.

== Demographics ==
Historical population
Census	Pop.	Note	%±
1880	95		—
1910	253		—
1920	248		−2.0%
1930	246		−0.8%
1940	239		−2.8%
1950	180		−24.7%
1960	114		−36.7%
1970	102		−10.5%
1980	109		6.9%
1990	83		−23.9%
2000	50		−39.8%
2010	55		10.0%
2020	40		−27.3%
U.S. Decennial Census

Elmdale is part of the Emporia Micropolitan Statistical Area.

=== 2020 census ===
The 2020 United States census counted 40 people, 11 households, and 9 families in Elmdale. The population density was 242.4 per square mile (93.6/km^{2}). There were 18 housing units at an average density of 109.1 per square mile (42.1/km^{2}). The racial makeup was 82.5% (33) white or European American (80.0% non-Hispanic white), 2.5% (1) black or African-American, 5.0% (2) Native American or Alaska Native, 0.0% (0) Asian, 0.0% (0) Pacific Islander or Native Hawaiian, 0.0% (0) from other races, and 10.0% (4) from two or more races. Hispanic or Latino of any race was 7.5% (3) of the population.

Of the 11 households, 36.4% had children under the age of 18; 54.5% were married couples living together; 36.4% had a female householder with no spouse or partner present. 18.2% of households consisted of individuals and 9.1% had someone living alone who was 65 years of age or older. The average household size was 4.5 and the average family size was 5.4.

42.5% of the population was under the age of 18, 5.0% from 18 to 24, 20.0% from 25 to 44, 27.5% from 45 to 64, and 5.0% who were 65 years of age or older. The median age was 26.5 years. For every 100 females, there were 100.0 males. For every 100 females ages 18 and older, there were 109.1 males.

The 2016–2020 5-year American Community Survey estimates show that the median household income was $43,750 (with a margin of error of +/- $12,788). The median income for those above 16 years old was $16,250 (+/- $12,575).

=== 2010 census ===
As of the census of 2010, there were 55 people, 23 households, and 11 families residing in the city. The population density was 323.5 inhabitants per square mile (124.9/km^{2}). There were 27 housing units at an average density of 158.8 per square mile (61.3/km^{2}). The racial makeup of the city was 96.4% White and 3.6% from two or more races. Hispanic or Latino of any race were 9.1% of the population.

There were 23 households, of which 26.1% had children under the age of 18 living with them, 39.1% were married couples living together, 4.3% had a female householder with no husband present, 4.3% had a male householder with no wife present, and 52.2% were non-families. 43.5% of all households were made up of individuals, and 13% had someone living alone who was 65 years of age or older. The average household size was 2.39 and the average family size was 3.09.

The median age in the city was 45.3 years. 23.6% of residents were under the age of 18; 9.1% were between the ages of 18 and 24; 16.3% were from 25 to 44; 38.2% were from 45 to 64; and 12.7% were 65 years of age or older. The gender makeup of the city was 56.4% male and 43.6% female.

== Arts and culture ==
The Clover Cliff Ranch House is listed on the National Register of Historic Places. It is located 4 miles southwest of Elmdale along the north side of U.S. Route 50 highway.

== Government ==
Elmdale government consists of a mayor and five council members.

== Education ==
The community is served by Chase County USD 284 public school district. It has two schools.

- Chase County Junior/Senior High School, 600 Main St in Cottonwood Falls.
- Chase County Elementary School, 410 Palmer St in Strong City.

Before the creation of USD 284, the Elmdale Cougars won the Kansas State High School class B baseball championship in 1961. In 1967, the high school closed, then later the grade school.

== Infrastructure ==
=== Transportation ===
U.S. Route 50 highway and BNSF Railway pass through the city.

== See also ==
- National Register of Historic Places listings in Chase County, Kansas
- Cottonwood River and Great Flood of 1951
