= Diamond Creek Township, Kansas =

Diamond Creek Township
- Township
- Location within Chase County

- Location within the state of Kansas
- Coordinates: 38°26′05″N 096°41′21″W
- Country: United States
- State: Kansas
- County: Chase

Area
  - Total: 144.40 sq mi (373.99 km^{2})
  - Land: 144.05 sq mi (373.09 km^{2})
  - Water: 0.35 sq mi (0.9 km^{2}) 0.24%
- Elevation: 1,339 ft (408 m)

Population (2000)
  - Total: 237
  - Density: 1.6/sq mi (0.6/km^{2})
- GNIS feature ID: 0477160

Diamond Creek Township is a township in Chase County, Kansas, United States. As of the 2000 census, its population was 237.

== Geography ==
Diamond Creek Township covers an area of 144.4 square miles (374 km^{2}). The streams of Collett Creek, Diamond Creek, Gannon Creek, Middle Creek, Mulvane Creek, Pickett Creek, Schaffer Creek, School Creek, Stribby Creek and Wildcat Creek run through this township.

== Communities ==
The township contains the city of Elmdale.

=== Hymer ===
Hymer was a community that previously existed in this Township. It was located on Diamond Creek (creek), 13 miles (21 km) north-west of Cottonwood Falls. It was a station on the Atchison, Topeka and Santa Fe Railway.

In the 1910 Census, it had a population of 30.

The community had a post office from March 19, 1872 until October 4, 1943.

Hymer is a corruption of the surname of Frank and George Hegwer, original landowners.

=== Elk ===
Elk was a community that previously existed in this Township. It was located on Middle Creek, 19 miles (31 km) north-west of Cottonwood Falls. Its mail and shipping point in the early 20th century was Antelope, in neighbouring Marion County, 9 miles (14 km) to its west.

In the 1910 Census, it had a population of 45.

The community had a post office from August 24, 1874 until December 15, 1924, when it was replaced by rural free delivery. It also had a general store, and a blacksmiths.

== Cemeteries ==
The township contains the following cemeteries:

- Boenitz.
- Diamond Creek.
- Elk, located at 38°24′51″N 96°47′5″W.
- Elmdale.
