= Flint Hills =

Geographic and ecological region of Kansas and Oklahoma, United States

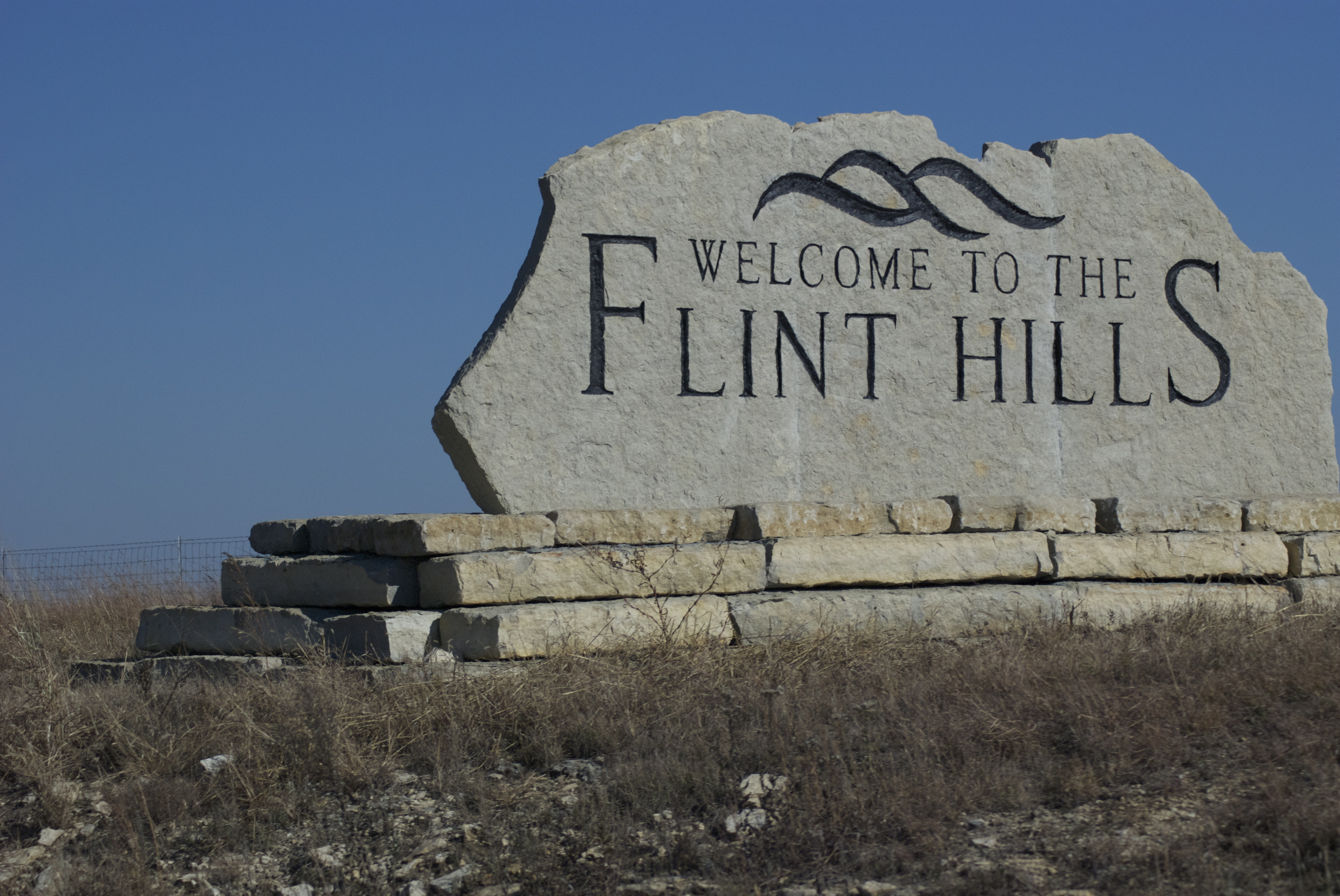

- Map of the Flint Hills ecoregion
- Location: Manhattan, Kansas (largest), Great Plains, United States
- Coordinates: 37°17′00″N 96°40′31″W
- Length: 157 mi (253 km)
- Width: 93 mi (150 km)
- Area: 9,936 sq mi (25,730 km^{2})
- Elevation: 1,680 ft (512 m)
- Website: Flint Hills Website

The Flint Hills, historically known as Bluestem Pastures or Blue Stem Hills, are a region of hills and prairies that lie mostly in eastern Kansas. It is named for the abundant residual flint eroded from the bedrock that lies near or at the surface. It consists of a band of hills extending from Marshall and Washington counties in the north to Cowley County, Kansas and Kay and Osage counties in Oklahoma in the south, to Geary and Shawnee counties west to east. Oklahomans generally refer to the same geologic formation as the Osage Hills or "the Osage."

The Flint Hills Ecoregion is designated as a distinct region because it has the densest coverage of intact tallgrass prairie in North America. Due to its rocky soil, the early settlers were unable to plow the area, resulting in the prevalence of cattle ranches as opposed to the crop land more typical of the Great Plains. These ranches rely on annual controlled burns conducted by ranchers every spring to renew the prairie grasses for cattle to graze.

The Flint Hills Discovery Center, a science and history museum focusing on the Flint Hills, opened in Manhattan, Kansas, in April 2012.

== Description ==
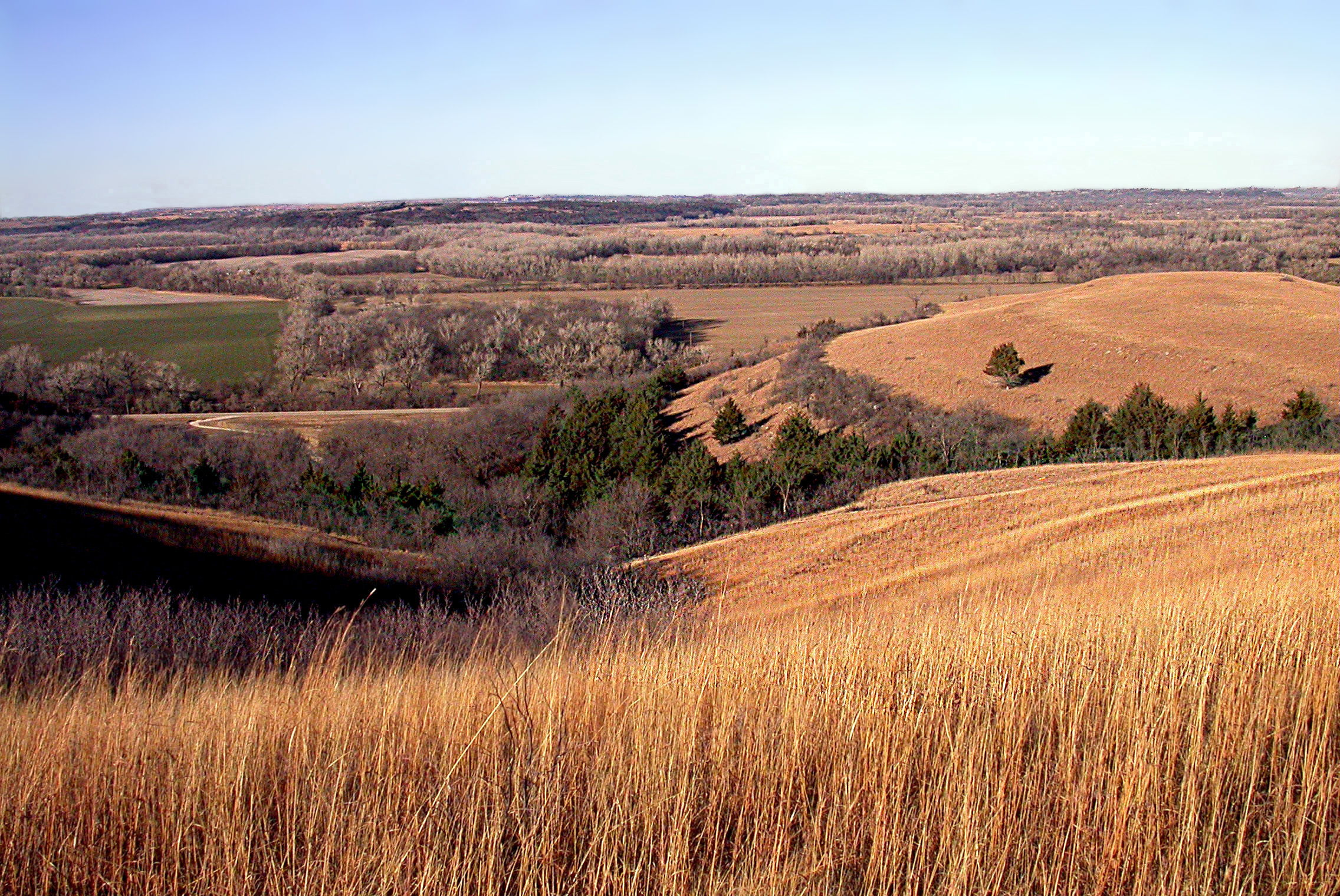
Konza Prairie Preserve, a tallgrass prairie in the Flint Hills

A walking trail in the Konza Prairie shows the height of the grasses in the fall.

Explorer Zebulon Pike coined the name the Flint Hills in 1806 when he entered into his journal, "passed very ruff flint hills". The underlying bedrock of the hills is a flinty limestone. The largest town in the area is Manhattan, Kansas, and the hills can be accessed from the Flint Hills Scenic Byway, which passes through the region.

== Geology ==
The rocks exposed in the Flint Hills were laid down about 250 million years ago during the Permian Period. During this time, much of the Midwest, including Kansas and Oklahoma, was covered with shallow seas. As a result, much of the Flint Hills is composed of limestone and shale, with plentiful fossils of prehistoric sea creatures. The most notable layer of chert-bearing limestone is the Florence Limestone Member, which is approximately 45-foot thick (14 m). Numerous roadcuts of the Florence Member are prominent along Interstate 70 in Riley County, Kansas. Unlike the Pennsylvanian limestones to the east, however, many of the limestones in the Flint Hills contain several bands of chert or flint. Because chert is much less soluble than the limestone surrounding it, the weathering of the limestone has left behind a clay soil with abundant chert gravel. Most of the hilltops in the region are capped with this chert gravel.

The highest point in the Flint Hills is Butler County High Point, with an elevation of 1680 ft (512 m).

== Environment ==
Due to shallow outcroppings of limestone and chert that lay just underneath the soil surface, corn and wheat farming were not practical over much of the area since plowing the land wasn't feasible. For this reason, cattle ranching became the main agricultural activity in the region.

Never having been plowed over and sparsely developed, the Flint Hills represent the last expanse of intact tallgrass prairie in the nation. They preserve the physical geography and native landscapes that once covered the Great Plains. Most of the plains, such as the Central tall grasslands to the north, have better soil than the Flint Hills and a richer plant cover, but have almost entirely been converted to farmland.

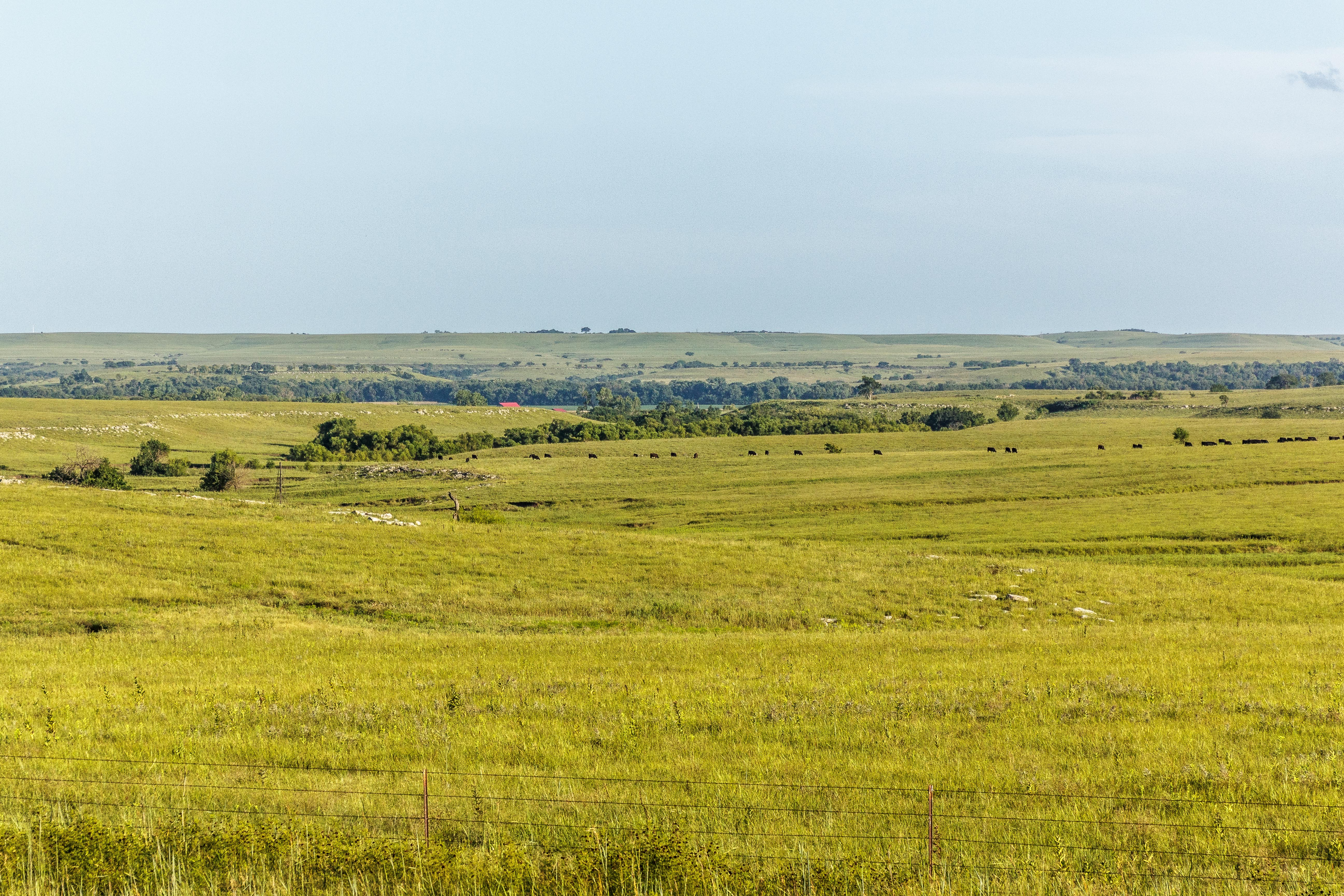
Landscape of Flint Hills

Tallgrass prairie is renewed by fire and grazing, which also keeps back the growth of trees and shrubs. Prominent grass species are big bluestem (Andropogon gerardi), switchgrass (Panicum virgatum), and Indian grass (Sorghastrum nutans). The expansion of shrubs and trees, referred to as woody plant encroachment, is a prominent regime shift and risk to the existing tallgrass prairie.

Animals native to the Flint Hills include the American bison, which once grazed the area by the millions and were almost entirely exterminated, but have now been reintroduced. The elk that once roamed the region are gone.

The United States Environmental Protection Agency and the World Wildlife Fund have designated the Flint Hills as an ecoregion, distinct from other grasslands of the Great Plains.

Four tallgrass prairie preserves are located in the Flint Hills. The largest of these, the Tallgrass Prairie Preserve, in the Osage Hills near Pawhuska, Oklahoma has a large population of bison and is an important refuge for other wildlife such as the greater prairie chicken (Tympanuchus cupido). The other preserves in Kansas, are the 17-square-mile (44 km^{2}) Tallgrass Prairie National Preserve in northern Chase County near Strong City, the Flint Hills Tallgrass Prairie Preserve east of Cassoday, "the Prairie Chicken Capital of the World", and the Konza Prairie, which is managed as a tallgrass prairie biological research station by Kansas State University and is located near Manhattan. The Flint Hills Trail is a hiking and bicycling trail that traverses 91 miles (146 km) of the Flint Hills with an extension to 117 miles (188 km) planned.

== In popular culture ==
- William Least Heat-Moon wrote a tribute to the Flint Hills and the Kansans who live there in his book PrairyErth.
- In mathematics, the Flint Hills series (which is named after the region) is an infinite series whose convergence is related to how irrational the number π is. Prior to 2026 it was not known whether or not the Flint Hill series converges. On October 7, 2026, artificial intelligence research company OpenAI announced claimed solutions to 377 previously open problems in mathematics with machine-checkable proofs. Among these solutions was a claimed proof that the irrationality exponent of 𝜋 is 2, which if true, establishes convergence of the Flint Hills series.

== See also ==
- Jacobs Creek flood
- List of ecoregions in the United States (WWF)
- List of protected grasslands of North America
- Unbound Gravel - annual gravel cycling event in Flint Hills
