= National Register of Historic Places listings in Chase County, Kansas =

Location of Chase County in Kansas

This is a list of the National Register of Historic Places listings in Chase County, Kansas.

This is intended to be a complete list of the properties and districts on the National Register of Historic Places in Chase County, Kansas, United States. The locations of National Register properties and districts for which the latitude and longitude coordinates are included below, may be seen in a map.

There are 20 properties and districts listed on the National Register in the county.

This National Park Service list is complete through NPS recent listings posted March 28, 2025.

== Current listings ==
	Name on the Register	Image	Date listed	Location	City or town	Description
1	Cartter Building	Cartter Building	November 23, 1977 (#77000573)	303 Broadway; 38°22′19″N 96°32′30″W	Cottonwood Falls	Built in 1888 for Dr. William H. Cartter, the ground floor contained the Smith and Cartter grocery store.
2	Cedar Point Mill	Cedar Point Mill	December 20, 2006 (#06001166)	Junction of Main and 1st Sts. 38°15′42″N 96°49′10″W	Cedar Point	Built from 1871 to 1875, replacing a wooden structure.
3	Chase County Courthouse	Chase County Courthouse	February 24, 1971 (#71000304)	On the square at the southern end of Broadway; 38°22′21″N 96°32′30″W	Cottonwood Falls	Built in 1873, it is the oldest operating courthouse in Kansas.
4	Chase County National Bank	Chase County National Bank	November 9, 1977 (#77000572)	301 Broadway; 38°22′19″N 96°32′30″W	Cottonwood Falls	Built in 1882 from nearby limestone.
5	Clements Stone Arch Bridge	Clements Stone Arch Bridge	December 12, 1976 (#76000816)	½ mile southeast of Clements over the Cottonwood River; 38°17′42″N 96°44′05″W	Clements	Built between 1886 and 1888.
6	Clover Cliff Ranch House	Clover Cliff Ranch House	November 9, 1977 (#77000574)	4 miles southwest of Elmdale off U.S. Route 50; 38°19′55″N 96°41′47″W	Elmdale	In 1867, J.R. Blackshere returned to Chase County, Kansas with his wife and four children to make his home on what would become the Clover Cliff Ranch. The stone house was completed by 1883.
7	Cottonwood Falls Grade School	Cottonwood Falls Grade School	June 28, 2021 (#100006682)	401 Maple St. 38°21′57″N 96°32′37″W	Cottonwood Falls	
8	Cottonwood River Bridge	Cottonwood River Bridge	July 2, 1985 (#85001422)	K-177, northern edge of Cottonwood Falls; 38°22′30″N 96°32′26″W	Cottonwood Falls	Built in 1914 by the Missouri Valley Bridge Company of Leavenworth, Kansas.
9	Cottonwood River Pratt Truss Bridge	Cottonwood River Pratt Truss Bridge	May 9, 2003 (#03000376)	Main St., 0.8 miles west of intersection with 1st St. 38°15′36″N 96°50′02″W	Cedar Point	Built in 1916, the Pratt Truss Bridge has a single span that measures 142 feet in length and 17 feet in width.
10	Crocker Ranch	Crocker Ranch	November 17, 1977 (#77000575)	1.5 miles north of Matfield Green on K-177; 38°10′55″N 96°34′05″W	Matfield Green	The Crocker Ranch, with its extensive cattle and farming operations, was begun in 1866 by Captain Erastus Bryant Crocker, a Civil War veteran. The house and various buildings were built by Erastus Crocker's son Edward Grey Crocker in the 1880s.
11	Fox Creek Stone Arch Bridge	Fox Creek Stone Arch Bridge	December 27, 2006 (#06001164)	½ mile north and ¾ mile west of junction of U.S. Route 50 and Cottonwood St. 38°24′08″N 96°32′54″W	Strong City	Construction of the native limestone bridge was begun in 1897 and completed in 1898.
12	Lower Fox Creek School	Lower Fox Creek School	September 6, 1974 (#74000822)	Northwest of Strong City on K-177; 38°26′43″N 96°33′30″W	Strong City	Stephen F. Jones donated the land and a local stonemason built the schoolhouse in 1882 with limestone from nearby quarries.
13	Matfield Green High School Gymnasium	Matfield Green High School Gymnasium	May 3, 2024 (#100010290)	408 Bocook Street; 38°09′33″N 96°33′33″W	Matfield Green	
14	McNee Barns	McNee Barns	June 25, 2013 (#13000431)	3 miles southwest of Elmdale on U.S. Highway 50 (SS T20S R7E); 38°20′15″N 96°40′47″W	Elmdale	The structures include: a circa 1920 horse barn, a 1948 boxcar barn, a dry-laid stone fence, and an Aermotor windmill.
15	Pioneer Bluffs Ranch Historic District	Pioneer Bluffs Ranch Historic District	September 13, 1990 (#90001441)	K-177 1 mile north of Matfield Green; 38°10′33″N 96°33′50″W	Matfield Green	The ranch is part of the 160 acres (65 ha) farm, settled by Charles Rogler in 1859. The original log cabin does not exist, but the now standing old house and old barn were constructed in 1872.
16	William C. & Jane Shaft House	William C. & Jane Shaft House	July 8, 2010 (#10000449)	1682 FP Rd. 38°18′53″N 96°43′58″W	Clements	The land was settled by William and Jane Shaft in 1854. In 1857, a small stone house was built; and, in 1868, the two story limestone house was added to the south side of the original structure. Jane Shaft's name is inscribed within the east facing gable.
17	Spring Hill Farm and Stock Ranch House	Spring Hill Farm and Stock Ranch House	April 16, 1971 (#71000305)	3 miles north of Strong City on K-177; 38°26′03″N 96°33′27″W	Strong City	Now part of Tallgrass Prairie National Preserve
18	Strong City Atchison, Topeka, & Santa Fe Depot	Strong City Atchison, Topeka, & Santa Fe Depot	June 27, 2007 (#07000607)	102 W. Topeka Ave. 38°23′42″N 96°32′24″W	Strong City	Built in 1913 at a cost of $20,000, the Atchison, Topeka, and Santa Fe Railroad Depot operated until 1938. It included two passenger waiting rooms, a ticket office, telegraph desk, main office, and baggage room. The depot's west end was the freight office.
19	Whitney Ranch Historic District	Whitney Ranch Historic District	May 11, 1995 (#95000589)	Southeast of Hymer off unnamed road 38°28′46″N 96°40′45″W	Hymer	
20	Wood House	Wood House	March 17, 1974 (#74000821)	East of Cottonwood Falls; 38°22′14″N 96°31′10″W	Cottonwood Falls	

== See also ==
- List of National Historic Landmarks in Kansas
- National Register of Historic Places listings in Kansas
