= Chase County High School =

Chase County High School may refer to:

- Chase County High School (Nebraska) in Imperial, Nebraska
- Chase County Junior/Senior High School in Cottonwood Falls, Kansas
