= Cottonwood Falls Grade School =

- U.S. National Register of Historic Places
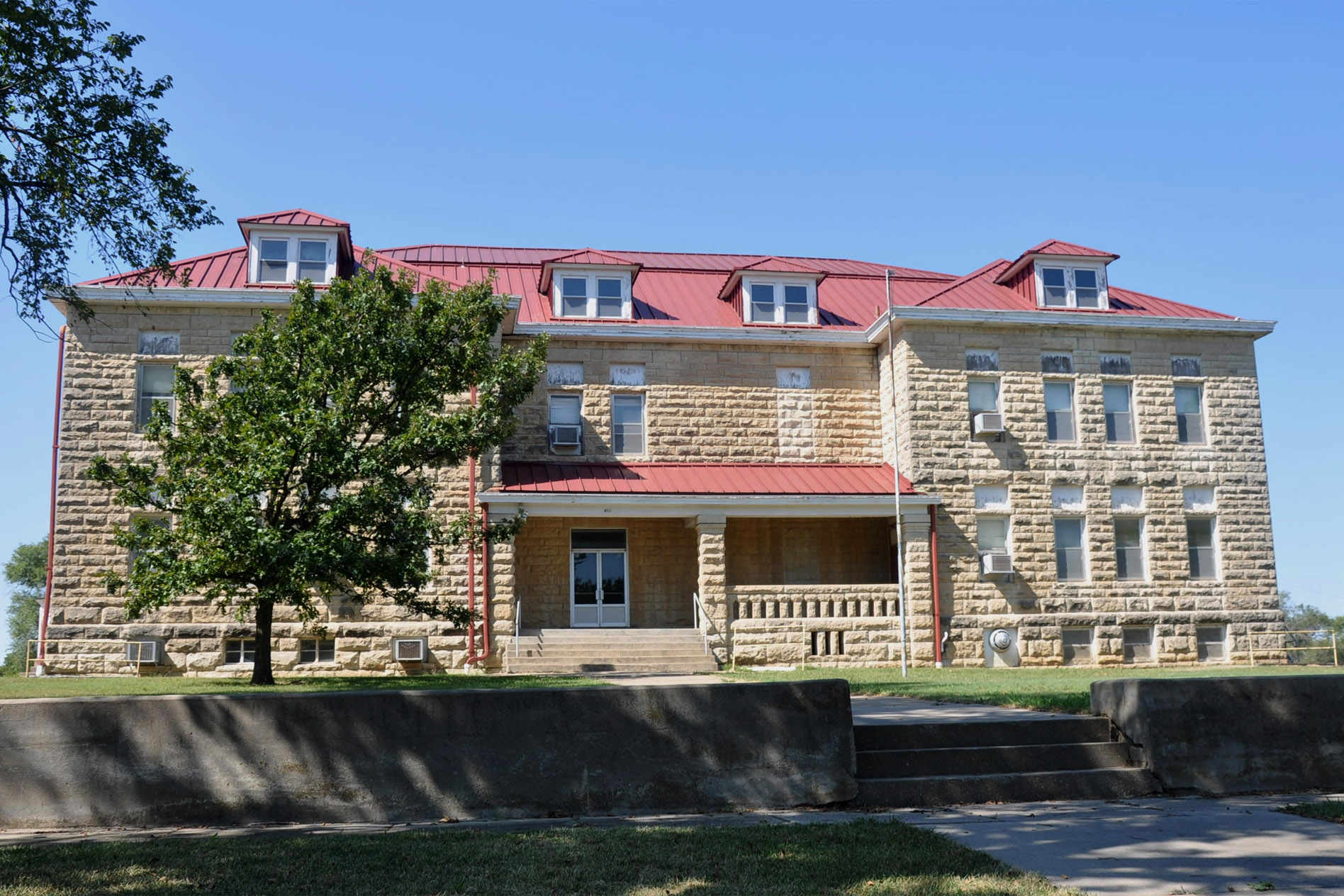

- Location within Kansas
- Location: 401 Maple St., Cottonwood Falls, Kansas
- Coordinates: 38°21′57″N 96°32′37″W
- Built: 1904
- Built by: Rettiger and Norton
- Architect: J. D. Walters
- MPS: Public Schools of Kansas MPS
- NRHP reference No.: 100006682
- Added to NRHP: June 28, 2021

The Cottonwood Falls Grade School is a historic school building at 401 Maple Street in Cottonwood Falls, Kansas. The two-and-a-half story stone building was built in three stages: the original 1904 building, an addition in 1915, and a second addition for a gymnasium in 1963. The 1904 school building was one of several public improvements built in Cottonwood Falls during the Progressive Era, and it was constructed through a combination of state funding and public bond issues; the latter were needed twice, as the county initially underestimated the school's cost. The school quickly outgrew its new building, and in 1915 the county's voters approved a $12,000 bond to build an addition onto the school. While the population of Cottonwood Falls stabilized over the next few decades, statewide school consolidation efforts and new education requirements in the 1950s forced the school to consider expansion again. After voting down a new school building in 1957, the school district approved a gymnasium addition in 1962 in response to a new state physical education standard; the addition was completed the following year. The school continued to operate until 2010, when it became a victim of consolidation itself and its students were sent to the grade school in nearby Strong City.

The school was added to the National Register of Historic Places on June 28, 2021.
