= Wood House (Cottonwood Falls, Kansas) =

Historic house in Kansas, United States

- U.S. National Register of Historic Places
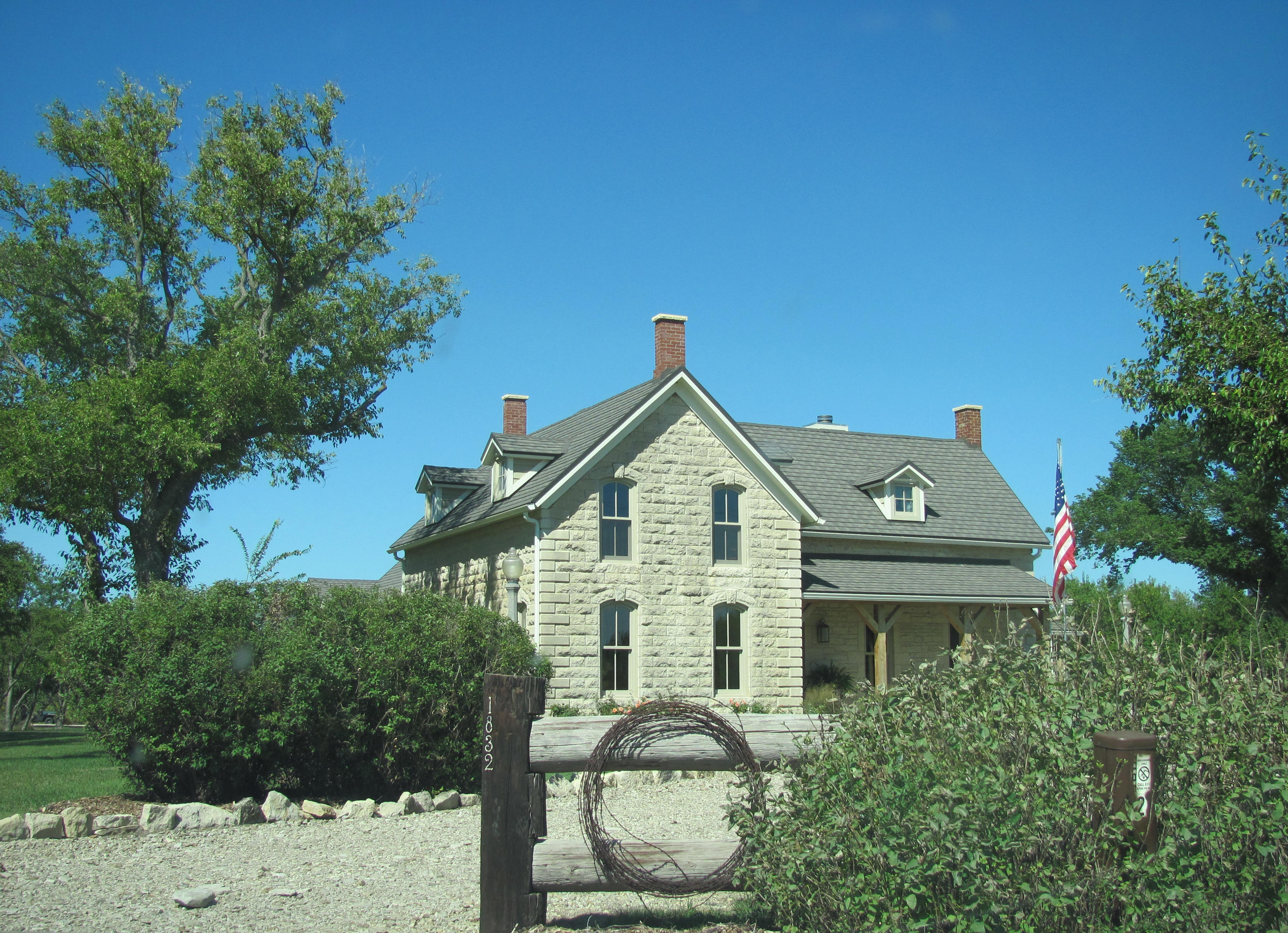

- Location within Kansas
- Nearest city: Cottonwood Falls, Kansas
- Coordinates: 38°22′14″N 96°31′10″W
- Area: 2.5 acres (1.0 ha)
- NRHP reference No.: 74000821
- Added to NRHP: March 17, 1974

The Wood House is a historic house located east of Cottonwood Falls in Chase County, Kansas. The house was built in the 1860s by politician Samuel Newitt Wood; while its construction date is not certain, Wood's correspondence and real estate advertisements narrow the date to between 1864 and 1869. Wood was a member of the Kansas Territorial Legislature before Kansas statehood and both the Kansas Senate and Kansas House of Representatives afterwards; he was known for his support of the Free State cause, which opposed slavery in Kansas. He also served as Chase County attorney and pursued several local business ventures, including publishing the county's first newspaper. Wood sold the farm in 1874 and moved westward; he was ultimately killed in 1891 during the Stevens County seat war. The house passed to the Cartter family, who owned it through the 1930s.

The house was added to the National Register of Historic Places on March 17, 1974.
