= Chase County USD 284 =

Public school district in Kansas, U.S.

Address
- 219 Broadway St. Cottonwood Falls, Kansas, 66845; United States
- Coordinates: 38.3725°N 96.5419°W

District information
- Type: Public
- Grades: K to 12
- Superintendent: Glenna Grinstead
- Schools: 2

Other information
- Website: usd284.org

Chase County USD 284 is a public unified school district headquartered in Cottonwood Falls, Kansas, United States. The district includes the communities of Cottonwood Falls, Strong City, Cedar Point, Elmdale, Matfield Green, Bazaar, Clements, Saffordville, Toledo, and nearby rural areas of Chase, Lyon, Morris Counties. The district covers almost all of Chase County, and portions of Lyon and Morris counties.

== Schools ==
The school district operates the following schools:

- Chase County Junior/Senior High School at 600 Main Street in Cottonwood Falls.
- Chase County Elementary School at 410 Palmer Street in Strong City.

== See also ==
- Kansas State Department of Education
- Kansas State High School Activities Association
- List of high schools in Kansas
- List of unified school districts in Kansas
