= Toledo, Kansas =

Unincorporated community in Chase County, Kansas

- Unincorporated community
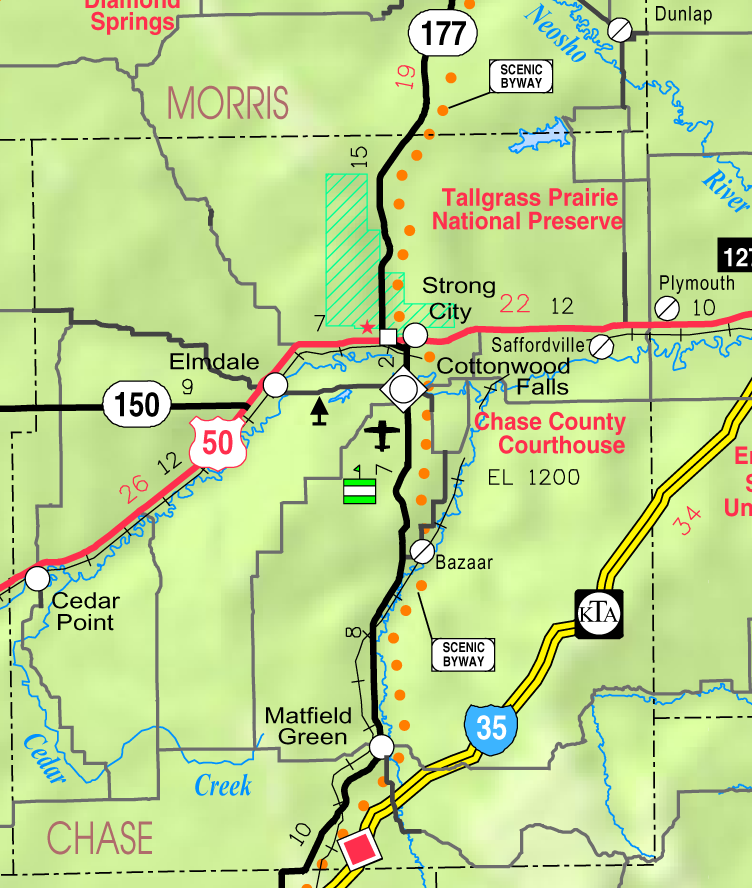
- KDOT map of Chase County (legend)

- Location within Kansas Location within the United States
- Country: United States
- State: Kansas
- County: Chase
- Elevation: 1,171 ft (357 m)
- Time zone: UTC-6 (CST)
  - Summer (DST): UTC-5 (CDT)
- Area code: 620
- FIPS code: 20-70765
- GNIS ID: 477280

Toledo is an unincorporated community in Chase County, Kansas, United States. It is located approximately seven miles west of Emporia at the intersection of Yy and 240 Roads (about one mile north of U.S. Route 50).

== History ==
A post office was opened in Toledo in 1858, and remained in operation until it was discontinued in 1903.

== Education ==
The community is served by Chase County USD 284 public school district. It has two schools.
