= Cottonwood Falls Airport =

- IATA: none; ICAO: none; FAA LID: 9K0

Summary
- Airport type: Public
- Owner: City of Cottonwood Falls
- Serves: Cottonwood Falls, Kansas
- Elevation AMSL: 1,273 ft (388 m)
- Coordinates: 38°21′31″N 096°32′39″W

Map
- Location of airport in Kansas

Runways
Direction	Length		Surface
Direction	ft	m	Surface
17/35	2,300	701	Turf

Statistics (2009)
- Aircraft operations: 1,150
- Based aircraft: 3
- Source: Federal Aviation Administration

Cottonwood Falls Airport (FAA LID: 9K0) is a city-owned, public-use airport located one nautical mile (2 km) south of the central business district of Cottonwood Falls, a city in Chase County, Kansas, United States. It was formerly known as Chase County Airport.

== Facilities and aircraft ==
Cottonwood Falls Airport covers an area of 33 acres (13 ha) at an elevation of 1,273 feet (388 m) above mean sea level. It has one runway designated 17/35 with a turf surface measuring 2,300 by 155 feet (701 x 47 m).

For the 12-month period ending September 24, 2009, the airport had 1,150 aircraft operations, an average of 95 per month: 96% general aviation and 4% military. At that time there were 3 aircraft based at this airport: 67% single-engine and 33% ultralight.

== See also ==
- List of airports in Kansas
