= Strong City, Kansas =

City in Chase County, Kansas, US

- City
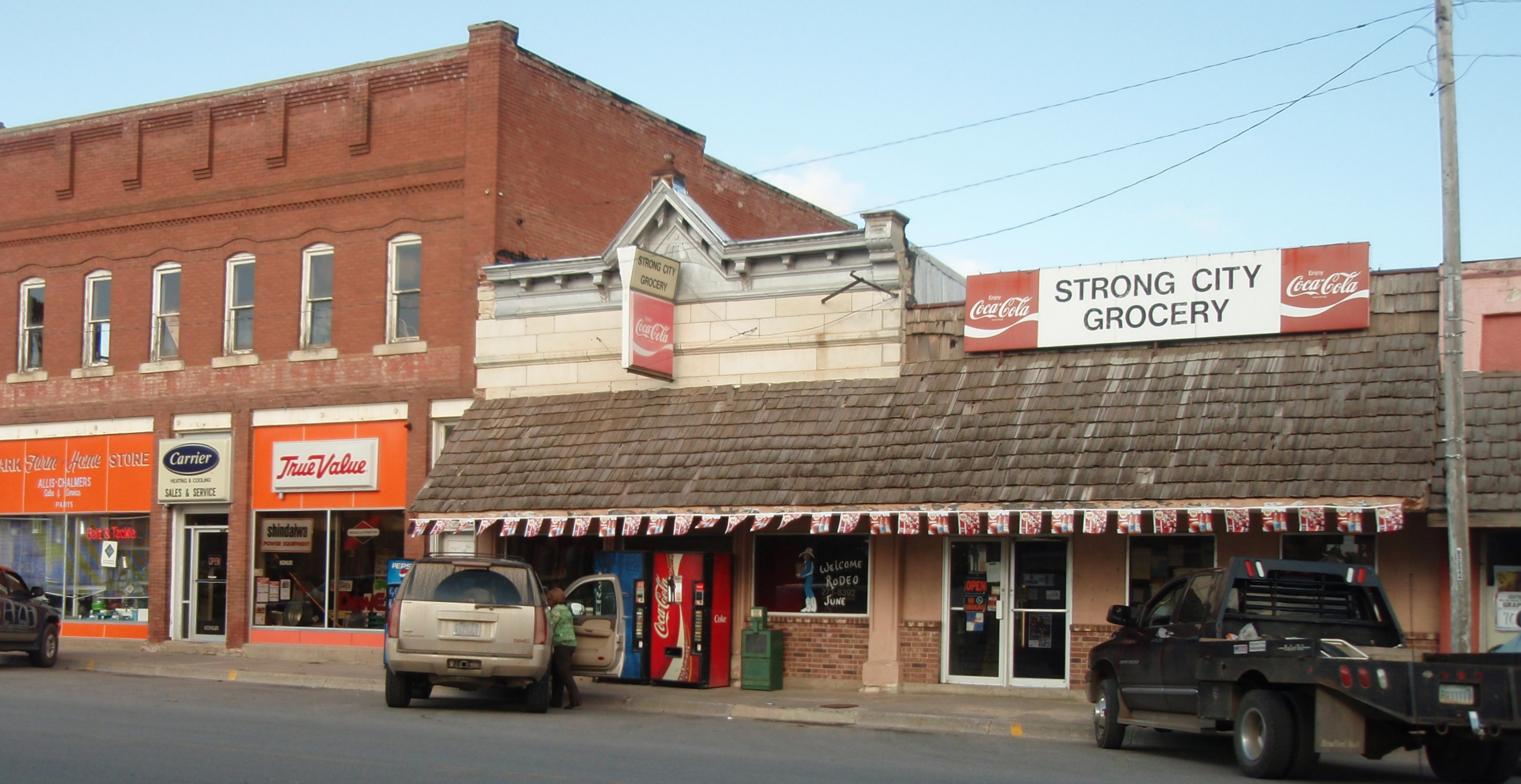
- Hardware Store and Grocery in Strong City (2009)

- Location within Chase County and Kansas

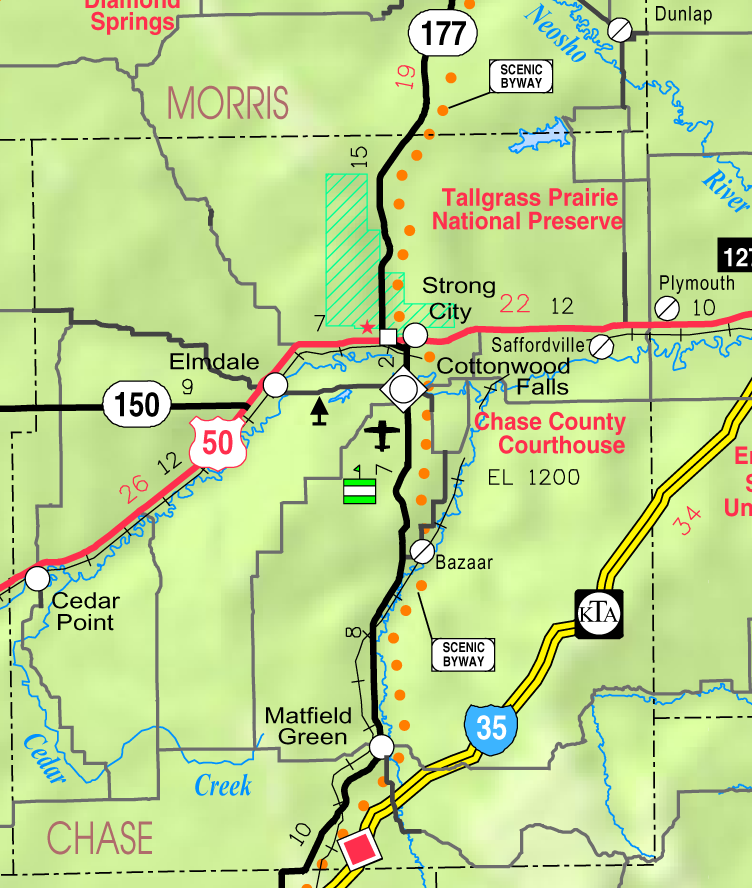
- KDOT map of Chase County (legend)
- Coordinates: 38°23′50″N 96°32′13″W
- Country: United States
- State: Kansas
- County: Chase
- Township: Strong
- Founded: 1871
- Incorporated: 1872
- Named for: William Strong

Government
  - Type: Mayor–Council
  - Mayor: Justin Garr

Area
  - Total: 0.55 sq mi (1.43 km^{2})
  - Land: 0.55 sq mi (1.42 km^{2})
  - Water: 0.0039 sq mi (0.01 km^{2})
- Elevation: 1,194 ft (364 m)

Population (2020)
  - Total: 386
  - Density: 704/sq mi (272/km^{2})
- Time zone: UTC-6 (CST)
  - Summer (DST): UTC-5 (CDT)
- ZIP Code: 66869
- Area code: 620
- FIPS code: 20-68650
- GNIS ID: 477264
- Website: strong-city.org

Strong City is a city in Chase County, Kansas, United States. Originally known as Cottonwood Station, in 1881 it was renamed Strong City after William Barstow Strong, then vice-president and general manager, and later president of the Atchison, Topeka and Santa Fe Railway. As of the 2020 census, the population of the city was 386. It is located along U.S. Route 50 highway.

== History ==
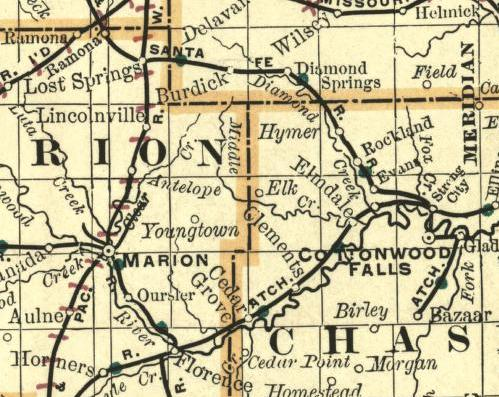
1893 railroad map.

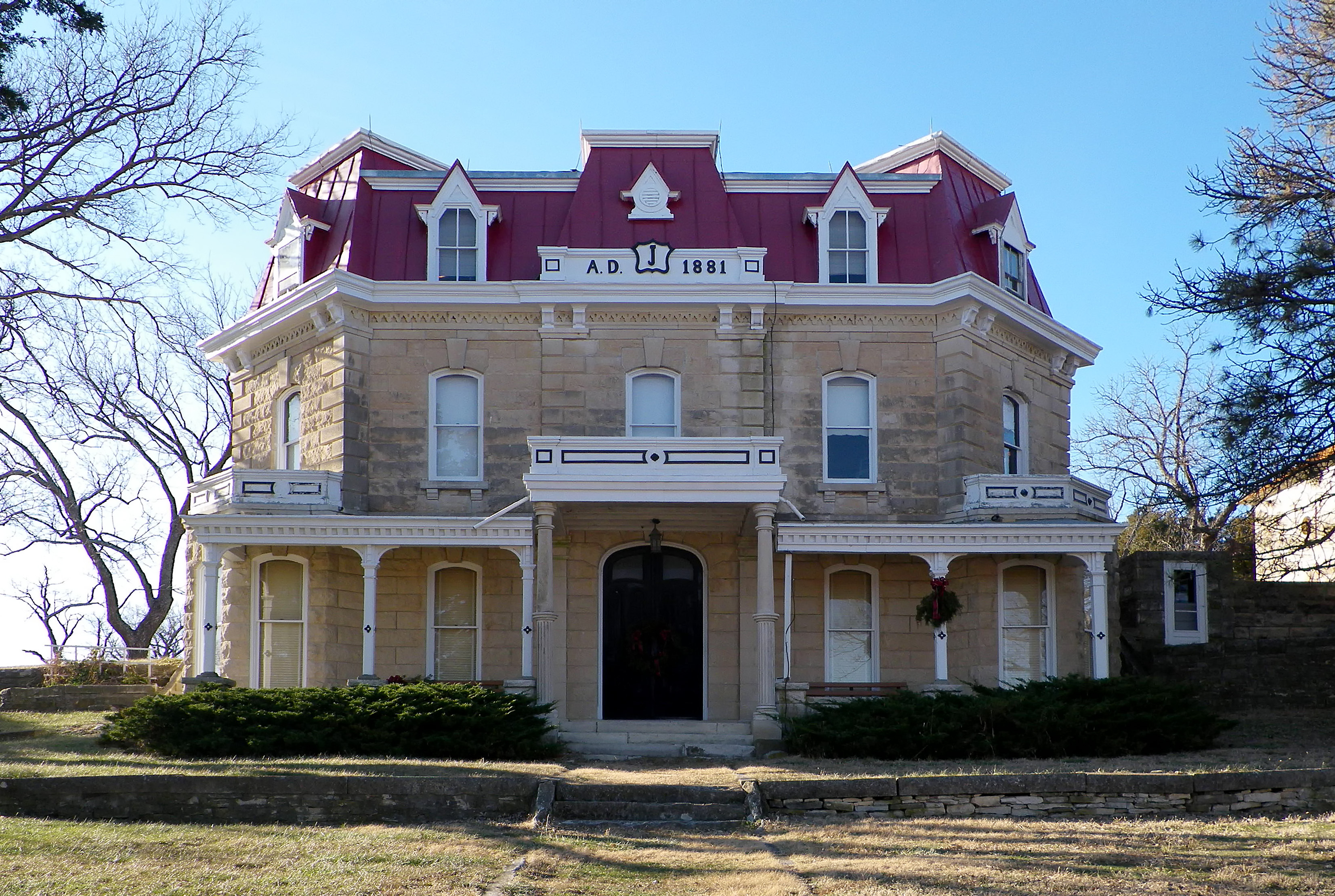
Spring Hill Ranch House (NRHP) at Tallgrass Prairie National Preserve, 2 miles north of Strong City (2009)

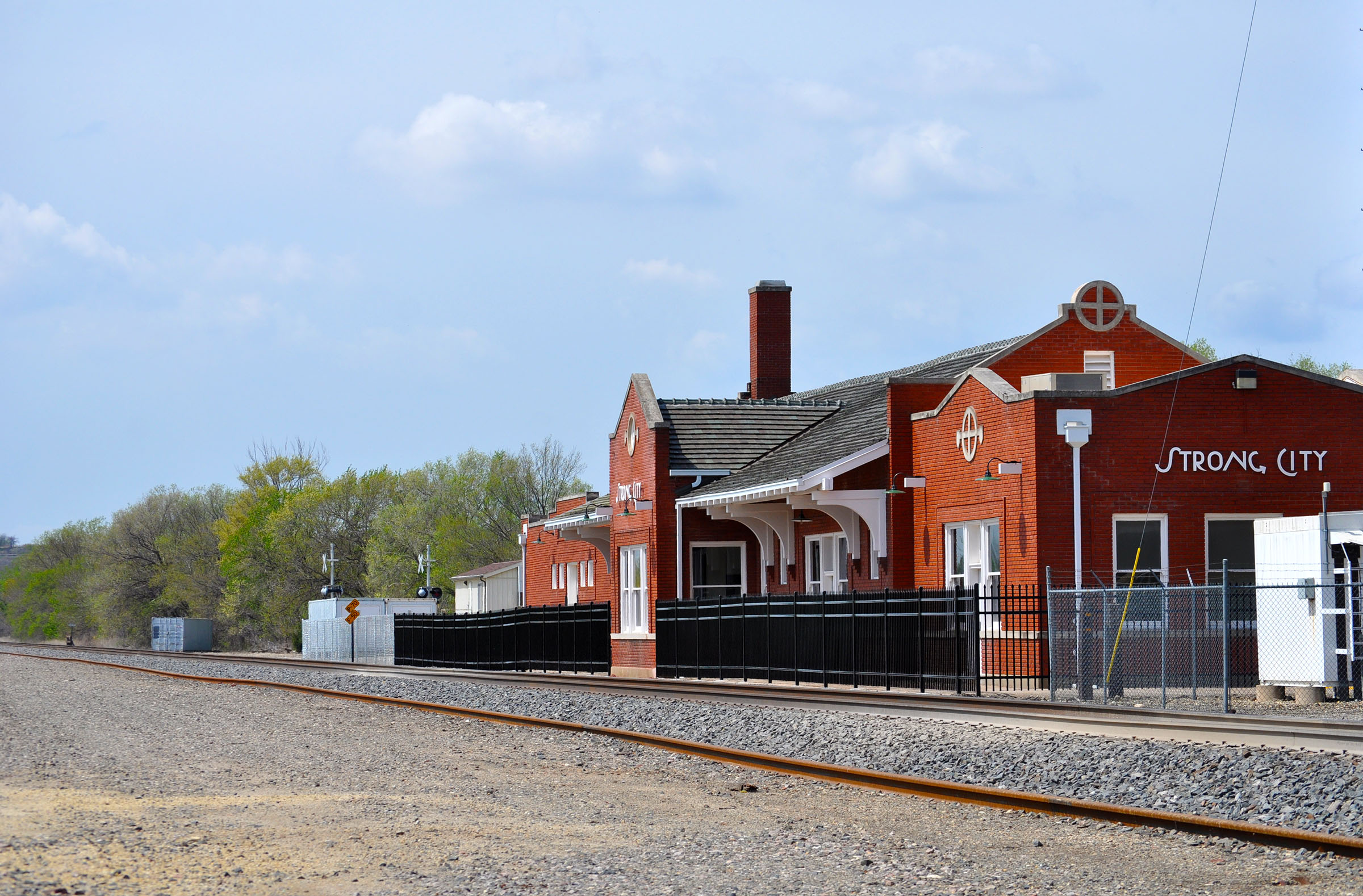
Strong City ATSF depot (2015)

=== Early history ===
For many millennia, the Great Plains of North America was inhabited by nomadic Native Americans. From the 16th century to 18th century, the Kingdom of France claimed ownership of large parts of North America. In 1762, after the French and Indian War, France secretly ceded New France to Spain, per the Treaty of Fontainebleau.

=== 19th century ===
In 1802, Spain returned most of the land to France. In 1803, most of the land for modern day Kansas was acquired by the United States from France as part of the 828,000 square mile Louisiana Purchase for 2.83 cents per acre.

In 1854, the Kansas Territory was organized, then in 1861 Kansas became the 34th U.S. state. In 1859, Chase County was established within the Kansas Territory, which included the land for modern day Strong City.

In 1871, the Atchison, Topeka and Santa Fe Railway extended a main line from Emporia to Newton. The city originated in March 1871 when the Atchison, Topeka and Santa Fe Railway was completed to the point then known as Cottonwood Station. Strong City was originally called Cottonwood, and under the latter name laid out in 1872.

In 1881, the name was changed to Strong, in honor of William Barstow Strong, General Superintendent of the Atchison, Topeka and Santa Fe Railway, and afterward the president of the company.

The original depot was a wooden building, built in 1872, which burned in 1902 and was replaced in 1903 by another wooden building. From 1887 to 1938, a six-stall engine roundhouse employed many workers.

In 1887, Atchison, Topeka and Santa Fe Railway built a branch line from Neva (three miles west of Strong City) to Superior, Nebraska. This branch line connected Strong City, Neva, Rockland, Diamond Springs, Burdick, Lost Springs, Jacobs, Hope, Navarre, Enterprise, Abilene, Talmage, Manchester, Longford, Oak Hill, Miltonvale, Aurora, Huscher, Concordia, Kackley, Courtland, Webber, Superior. At some point, the line from Neva to Lost Springs was pulled but the right of way has not been abandoned. This branch line was originally called "Strong City and Superior line", but later the name was shortened to the "Strong City line".

=== 20th century ===
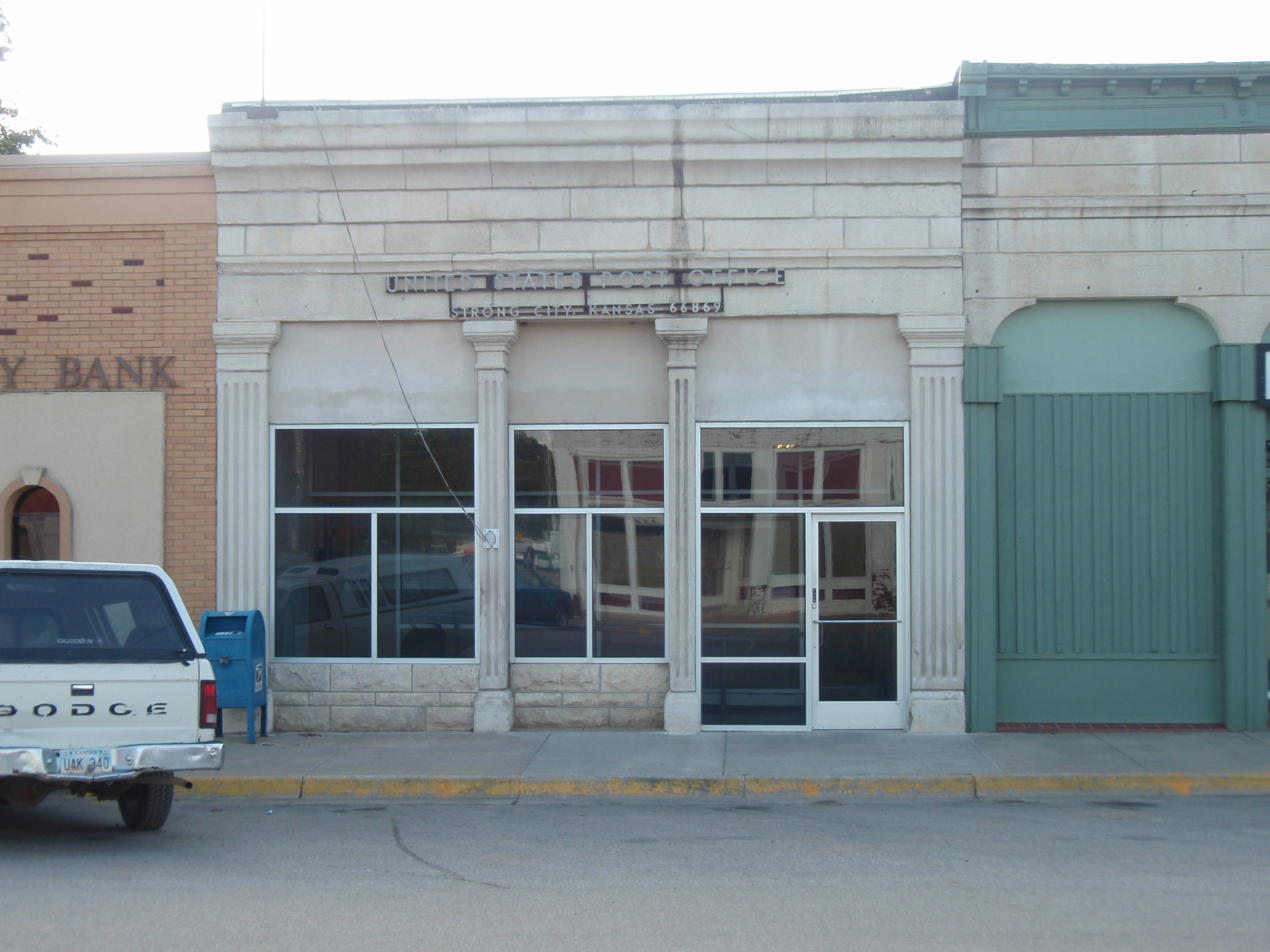
U.S. Post Office in Strong City (2009)

In 1912, construction of a new depot was begun about 100 feet (30 m) west of the old one, and was finished in 1913. The new brick depot was trimmed in native cut limestone was built for a cost of $20,000. A brick platform some 800-feet long was built along the front of the building, and a 250-foot freight platform was built along the rear of the building. Passenger service was discontinued in the late 1940s.

In 1945, the name was changed again, this time to Strong City.

In 1996, the Atchison, Topeka and Santa Fe Railway merged with Burlington Northern Railroad and renamed to the current BNSF Railway.

=== Stone industry ===
Local stonemasons and builders Barney Lantry & Son contracted with railroad companies for projects throughout the United States. In the beginning it built stone-work for certain phases of railroad construction, but later they built complete railroads, grading, laying the track, building bridges, stations, roundhouses, and other division buildings.

The first stone-crushers Kansas ever saw were brought to the state by the Lantrys and were operated on a very large scale at Strong City. Most of the stone for masonry and road-ballast for their jobs all over the west, was taken from their quarries at Strong City. Big stones for the Kansas State Capitol came from Strong City, each stone weighing 13,000 pounds. Stone was also used for public and private buildings in Kansas, Missouri, Nebraska, Iowa and Colorado.

When Barney Lantry died in 1895, officials of the Santa Fe Railroad from Los Angeles to Chicago attended his funeral services in Strong City.

== Geography ==
Strong City is located at 38°23′50″N 96°32′13″W (38.3972360, -96.5369507), in the scenic Flint Hills of the Great Plains. According to the United States Census Bureau, the city has a total area of 0.55 square miles (1.42 km^{2}), all land. The Cottonwood River is approximately 0.5 mile west of the city, and an old channel of the river is adjacent to the southwestern corner of the city.

=== Climate ===
The climate in this area is characterized by hot, humid summers and generally mild to cool winters. According to the Köppen Climate Classification system, Strong City has a humid subtropical climate, abbreviated "Cfa" on climate maps.

== Demographics ==
Historical population
Census	Pop.	Note	%±
1880	324		—
1890	976		201.2%
1900	1,128		15.6%
1910	762		−32.4%
1920	944		23.9%
1930	805		−14.7%
1940	848		5.3%
1950	680		−19.8%
1960	659		−3.1%
1970	545		−17.3%
1980	675		23.9%
1990	617		−8.6%
2000	584		−5.3%
2010	485		−17.0%
2020	386		−20.4%
U.S. Decennial Census

The center of population of Kansas is located 4.5 miles (7.2 km) north of Strong City at 38°27′15″N 96°32′10″W.

=== 2010 census ===
As of the census of 2010, there were 485 people, 212 households, and 123 families residing in the city. The population density was 881.8 inhabitants per square mile (340.5/km^{2}). There were 256 housing units at an average density of 465.5 per square mile (179.7/km^{2}). The racial makeup of the city was 96.5% White, 0.6% African American, 0.8% Native American, 0.2% Asian, 0.2% from other races, and 1.6% from two or more races. Hispanic or Latino of any race were 1.0% of the population.

There were 212 households, of which 25.9% had children under the age of 18 living with them, 48.6% were married couples living together, 5.2% had a female householder with no husband present, 4.2% had a male householder with no wife present, and 42.0% were non-families. 37.3% of all households were made up of individuals, and 15.5% had someone living alone who was 65 years of age or older. The average household size was 2.29 and the average family size was 3.10.

The median age in the city was 44.1 years. 22.5% of residents were under the age of 18; 8.7% were between the ages of 18 and 24; 20.8% were from 25 to 44; 31% were from 45 to 64; and 16.9% were 65 years of age or older. The gender makeup of the city was 51.3% male and 48.7% female.

=== 2000 census ===
As of the census of 2000, there were 584 people, 247 households, and 163 families residing in the city. The population density was 1,084.3 inhabitants per square mile (418.7/km^{2}). There were 287 housing units at an average density of 532.9 per square mile (205.8/km^{2}). The racial makeup of the city was 97.77% White, 1.03% African American, 0.17% Asian, and 1.03% from two or more races. Hispanic or Latino of any race were 1.37% of the population.

There were 247 households, out of which 28.7% had children under the age of 18 living with them, 49.4% were married couples living together, 9.3% had a female householder with no husband present, and 34.0% were non-families. 30.8% of all households were made up of individuals, and 13.0% had someone living alone who was 65 years of age or older. The average household size was 2.36 and the average family size was 2.90.

In the city, the population was spread out, with 25.0% under the age of 18, 8.9% from 18 to 24, 26.4% from 25 to 44, 24.3% from 45 to 64, and 15.4% who were 65 years of age or older. The median age was 38 years. For every 100 females, there were 110.8 males. For every 100 females age 18 and over, there were 104.7 males.

As of 2000 the median income for a household in the city was $30,192, and the median income for a family was $35,833. Males had a median income of $23,523 versus $20,938 for females. The per capita income for the city was $13,807. About 5.8% of families and 14.9% of the population were below the poverty line, including 21.4% of those under age 18 and 13.6% of those age 65 or over.

== Events and attractions ==
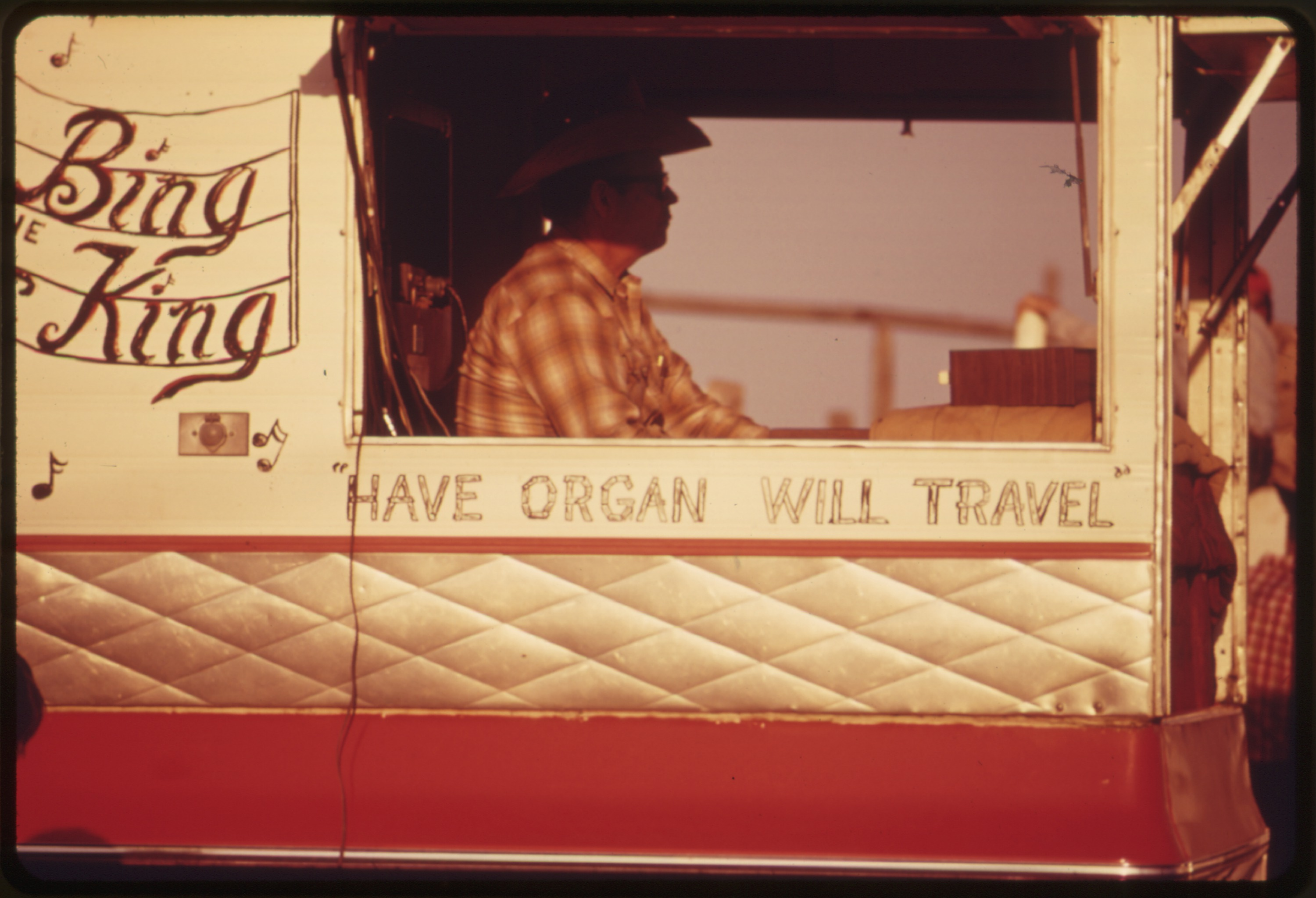
"Bing the King" playing organ at the Flint Hills Rodeo (1974)

- Flint Hills Rodeo, held annually since 1938
- Tallgrass Prairie National Preserve, north on K-177 highway.
- Strong City Caboose Park, north side of railroad tracks on west side of Cottonwood St.
- Kansas Historical Markers:
  - Chase County And The Bluestem Pasture Region Of Kansas, approximately 2 miles (3.2 km) east on U.S. Route 50 highway.
- Strong City has four listings on the National Register of Historic Places (NRHP):
  - Fox Creek Stone Arch Bridge (NRHP).
  - Lower Fox Creek School (NRHP).
  - Strong City Atchison, Topeka, & Santa Fe Depot (NRHP).
  - Strong City Opera House (NRHP).

== Government ==
The Strong City government consists of a mayor and five council members. The council meets the second Tuesday of each month at 6:30pm.

== Education ==
=== Primary and secondary education ===
The community is served by Chase County USD 284 public school district. It has two schools, Chase County Junior/Senior High School and Chase County Elementary School. Strong City schools were closed through school unification. The Strong City Indians won the Kansas State High School Boys class BB Basketball championship in 1965.

== Infrastructure ==
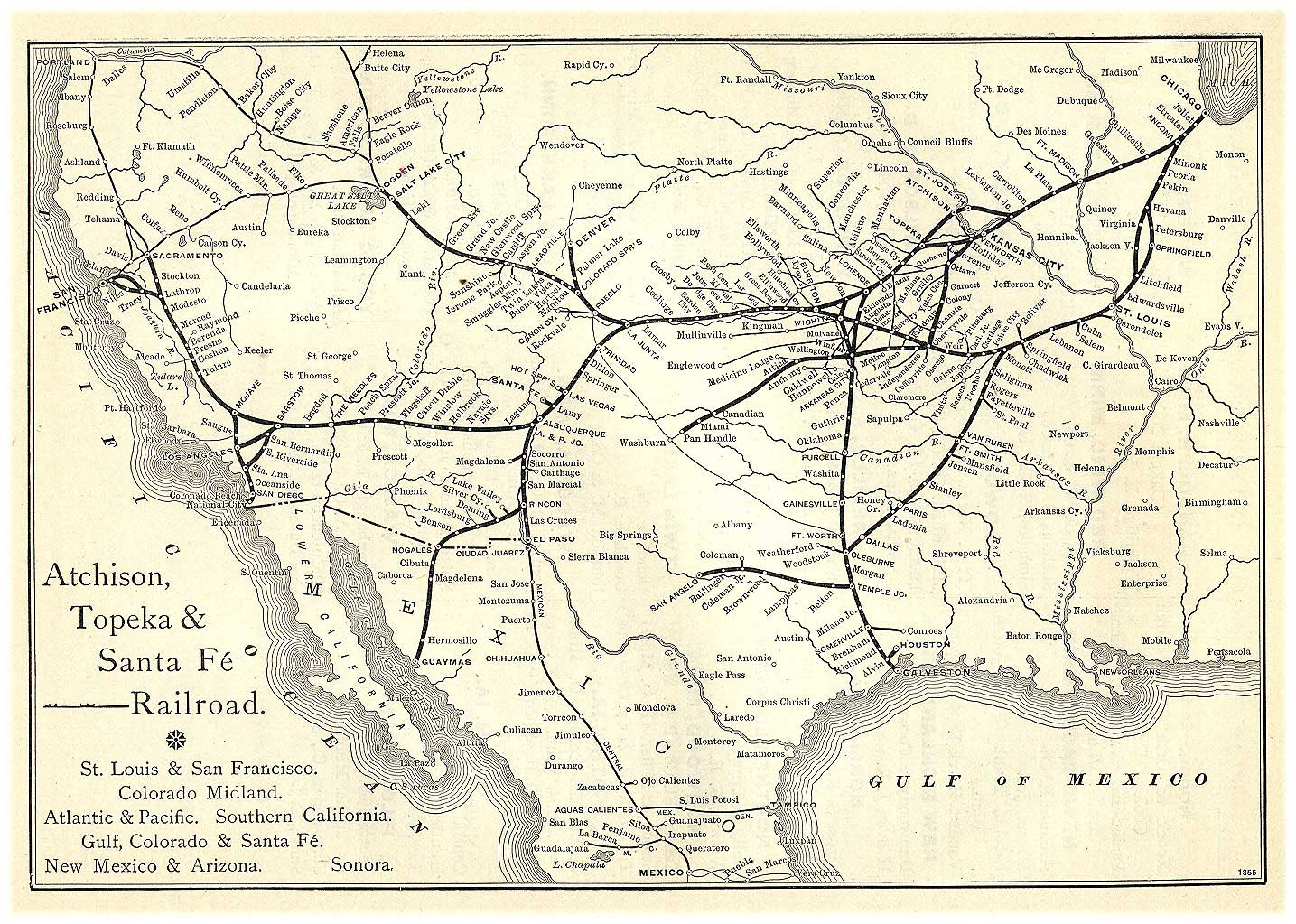
An Atchison, Topeka & Santa Fe Railway route map from 1891 issue of Grain Dealers and Shippers Gazetteer.

=== Transportation ===
U.S. Route 50 and the La Junta Subdivision of BNSF Railway pass east-west through the city. K-177 highway passes north-south through the city. The original U.S. Route 50 road still comes into the southwestern side of the city, parallel to the railroad tracks.

Strong City applied for an Amtrak station on Amtrak's proposed extension of the Heartland Flyer from Oklahoma City to Kansas City, Missouri. If the town's application were successful, that would make it one of the smallest towns in the Amtrak system to have a station.

== Notable people ==
- Dudley Doolittle (1881-1957), U.S. Representative from Kansas, lawyer, banker.

== See also ==
- Cottonwood Falls, Kansas, approximately 0.5 mile south of Strong City
- La Junta Subdivision, branch of the BNSF Railway
- National Register of Historic Places listings in Chase County, Kansas
- Cottonwood River and Great Flood of 1951
- Kansas State League, 1909 / 1910 baseball league
- April 1956 tornado outbreak
