= Whitney Ranch =

- Whitney Ranch Historic District
- U.S. National Register of Historic Places
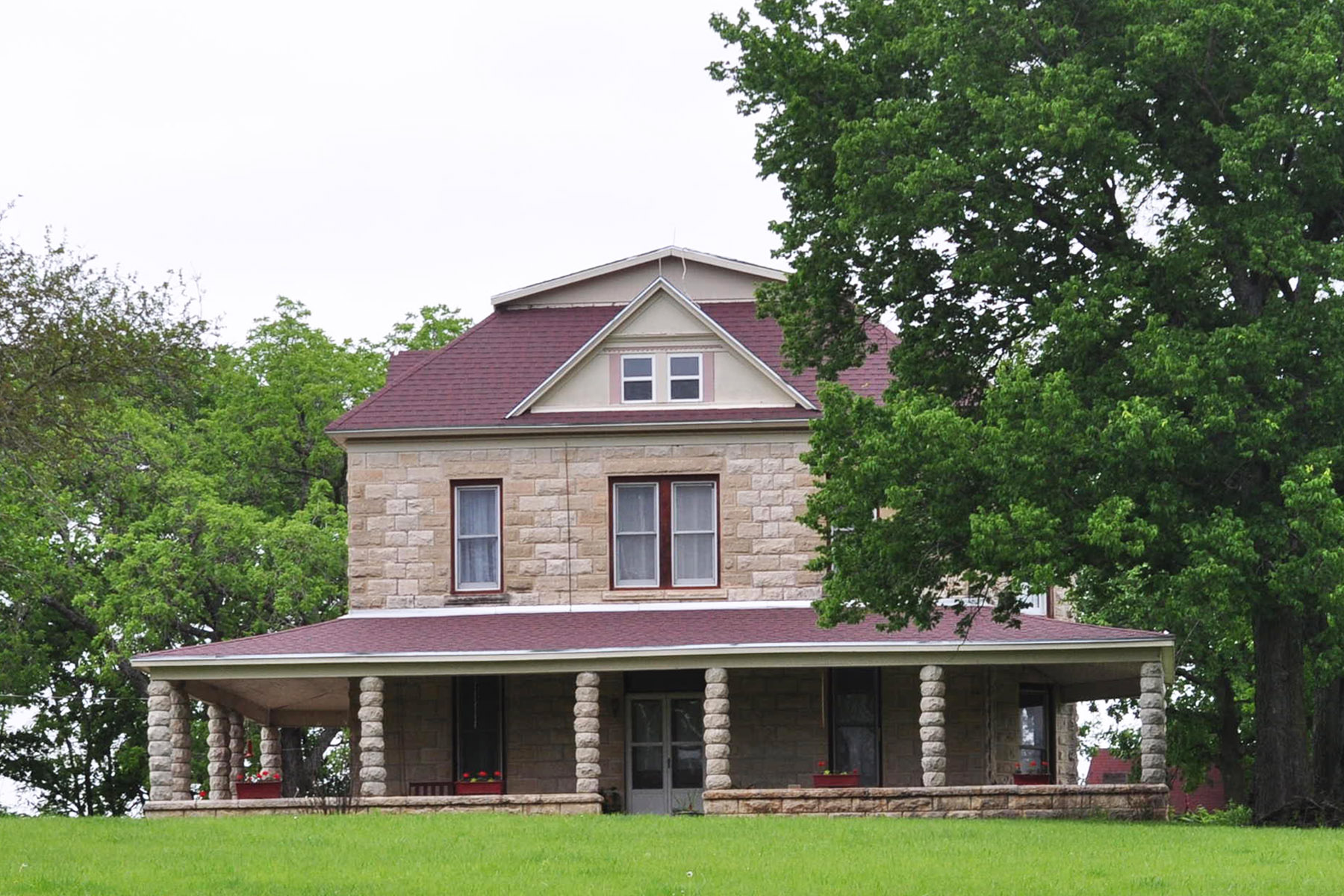

- Location within Kansas
- Nearest city: Hymer, Kansas
- Coordinates: 38°28′46″N 96°40′45″W
- Area: 10 acres (4.0 ha)
- Built: 1882
- Architectural style: Late Victorian
- NRHP reference No.: 95000589
- Added to NRHP: May 11, 1995

The Whitney Ranch is a historic ranch in Chase County, Kansas, located southeast of the ghost town of Hymer. The ranch consists of a two-story limestone house, which was built circa 1883, and four smaller outbuildings: a wash house, privy, chicken coop, and carriage house. The Western Land and Cattle Company, an English land firm, established the ranch in 1882; the company was part of a wave of English investors hoping to make money in Great Plains ranching. The ranch initially both raised its own cattle and served as a waypoint for shipping cattle between the company's ranch in Hartley County, Texas and markets in Kansas City. Sidney E. Whitney became the ranch's manager in 1893, and when the company liquidated its ranches in 1900, he purchased a large section of the ranch that included its headquarters. In addition to ranching his own cattle, Whitney began leasing his land to cattle owners who shipped their cattle to market through Hymer's Atchison, Topeka and Santa Fe Railway station, a practice known as transient grazing. Whitney lived on the ranch until 1918, and his family continued to live there and operate the ranch until 1969.

The ranch was added to the National Register of Historic Places on May 11, 1995.
