= Chase County Courthouse (Kansas) =

- U.S. National Register of Historic Places
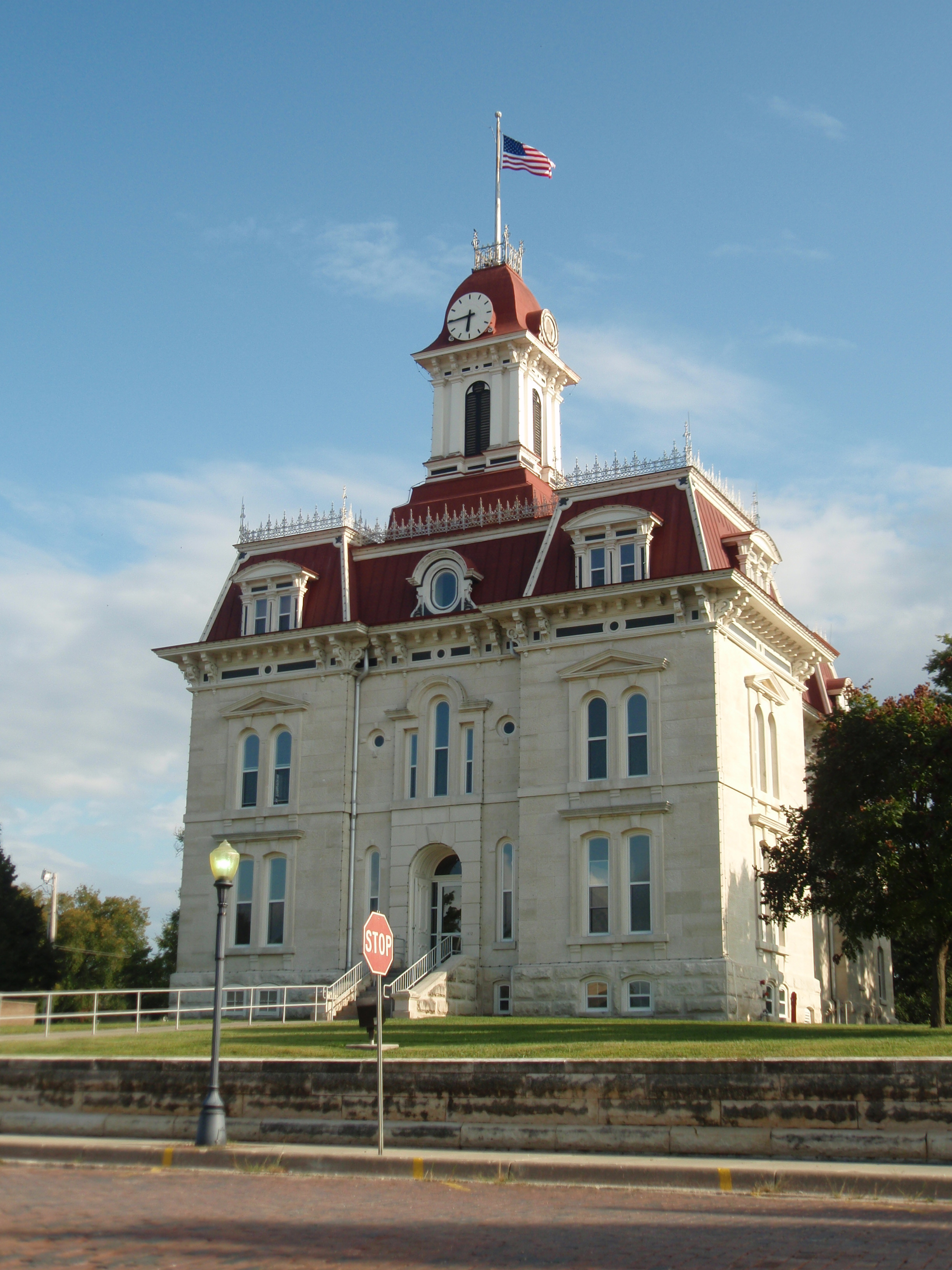

- Location within Kansas Location within the United States
- Location: On the square at S end of Broadway, Cottonwood Falls, Kansas
- Coordinates: 38°22′21″N 96°32′30″W
- Built: 1873
- Architectural style: French Renaissance, Second Empire
- NRHP reference No.: 71000304
- Added to NRHP: February 24, 1971

The Chase County Courthouse in Cottonwood Falls, Kansas, was built in 1873 and is the oldest operating courthouse in Kansas.

== Overview ==
The courthouse was constructed from local limestone, and the three-story winding staircase was constructed from local walnut trees. The architectural style has been described as Second Empire or French Renaissance Revival.

The building was listed on the National Register of Historic Places in 1971. The architect was John G. Haskell who was among the architects of the Kansas State Capitol.

Tours are available by appointment by contacting the Chase County Chamber of Commerce.

== Gallery ==
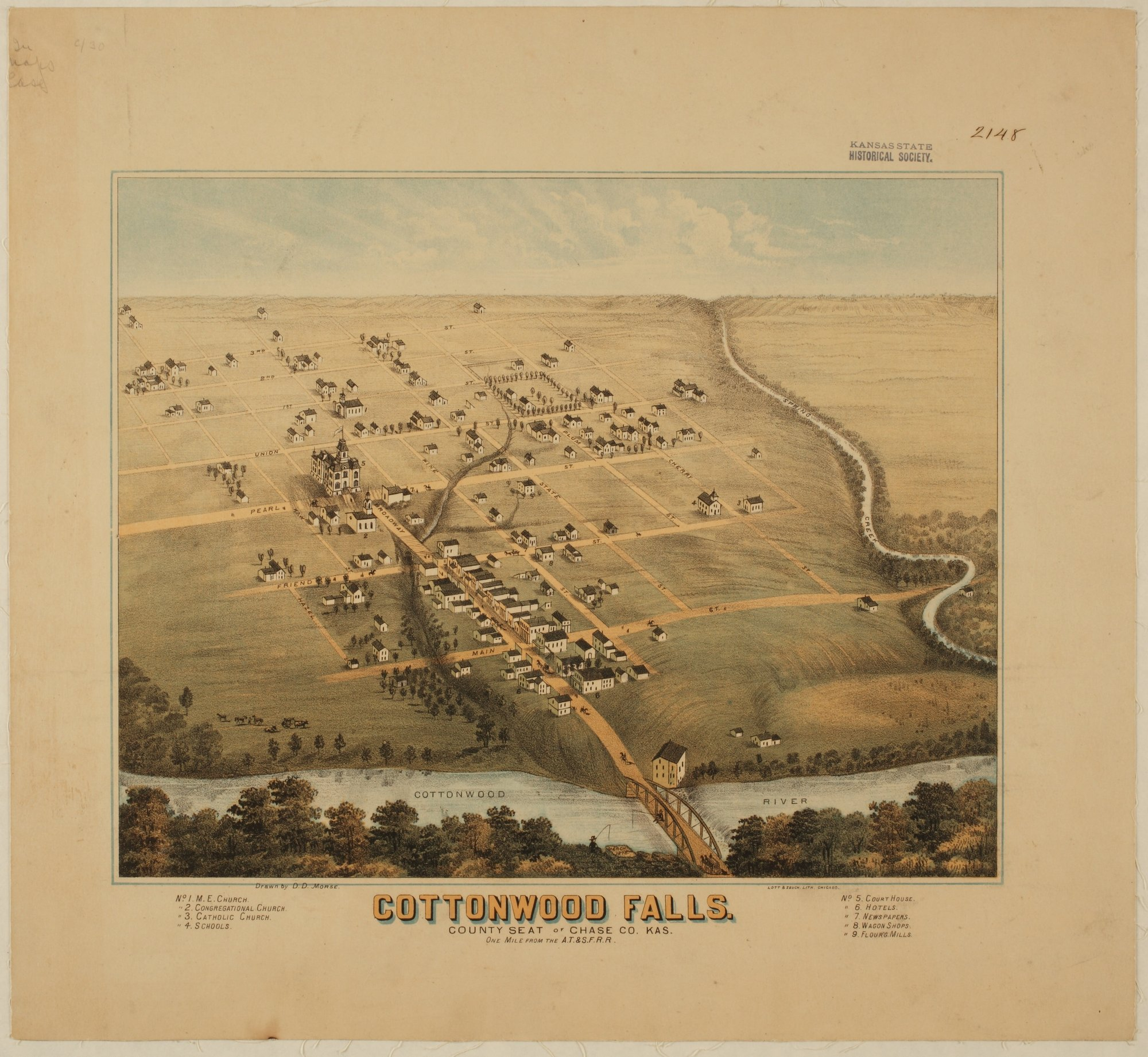
Birdseye view of Cottonwood Falls, 1875

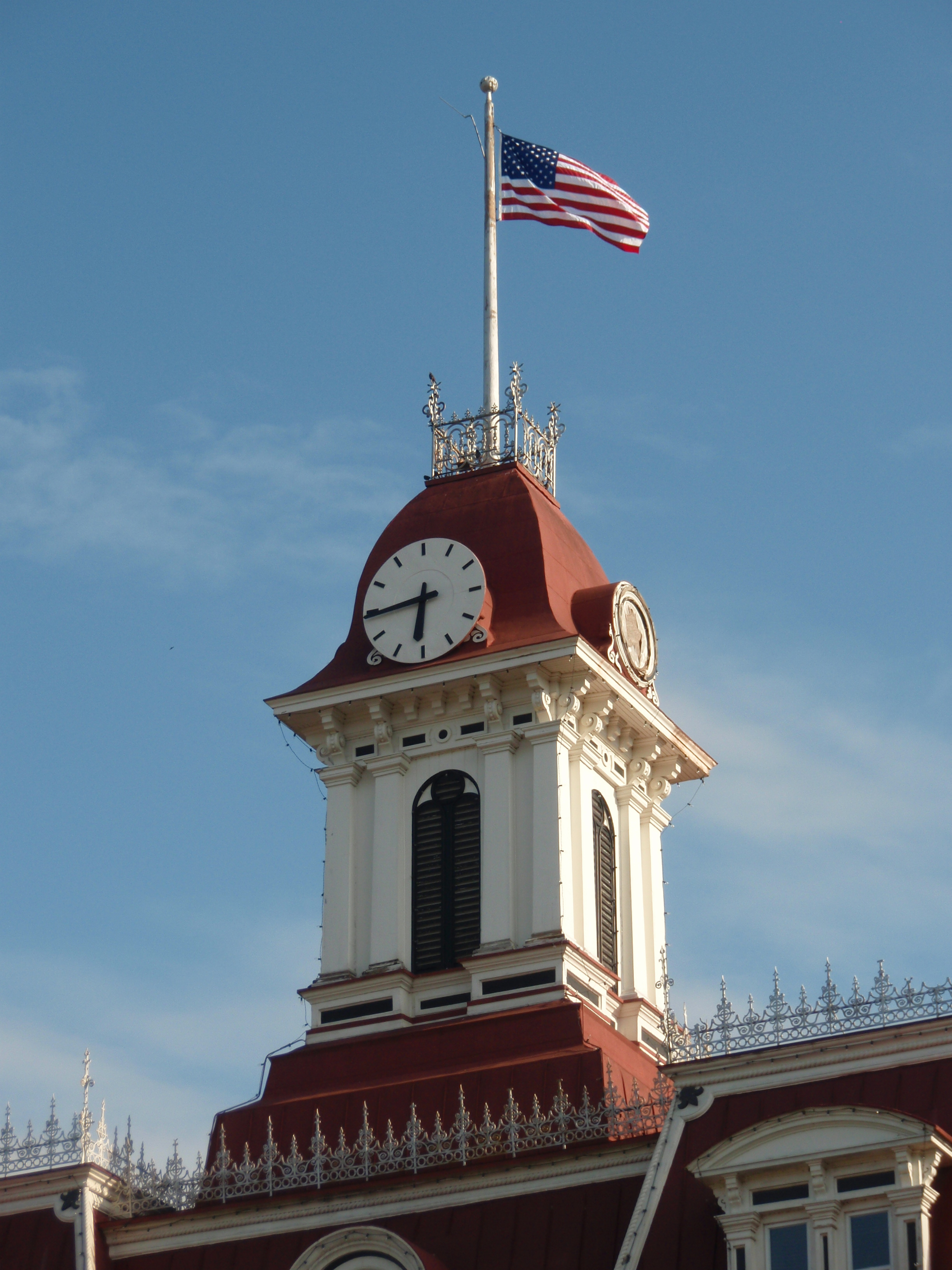
Clock Tower on the courthouse.

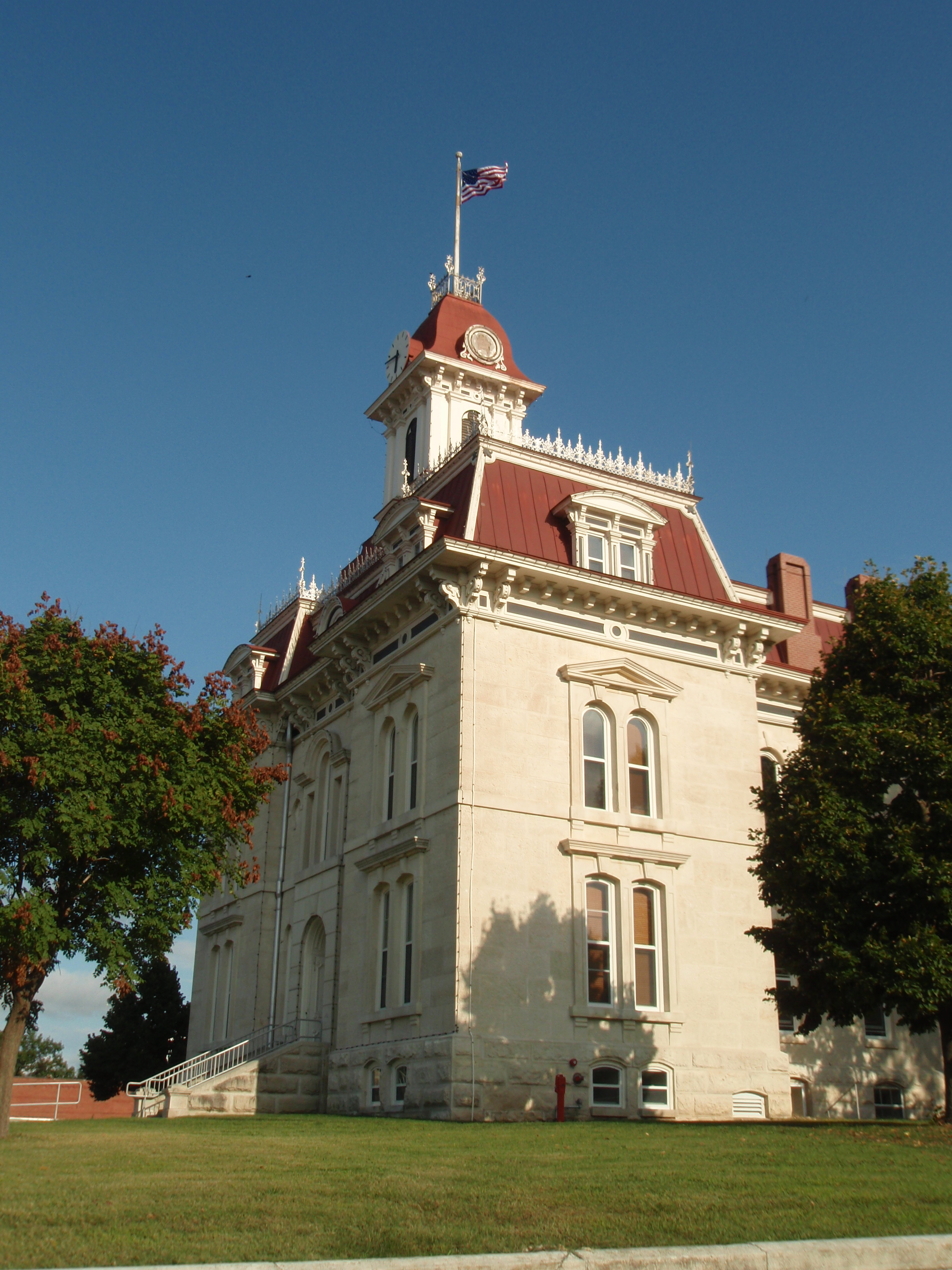
Sideview of the courthouse.

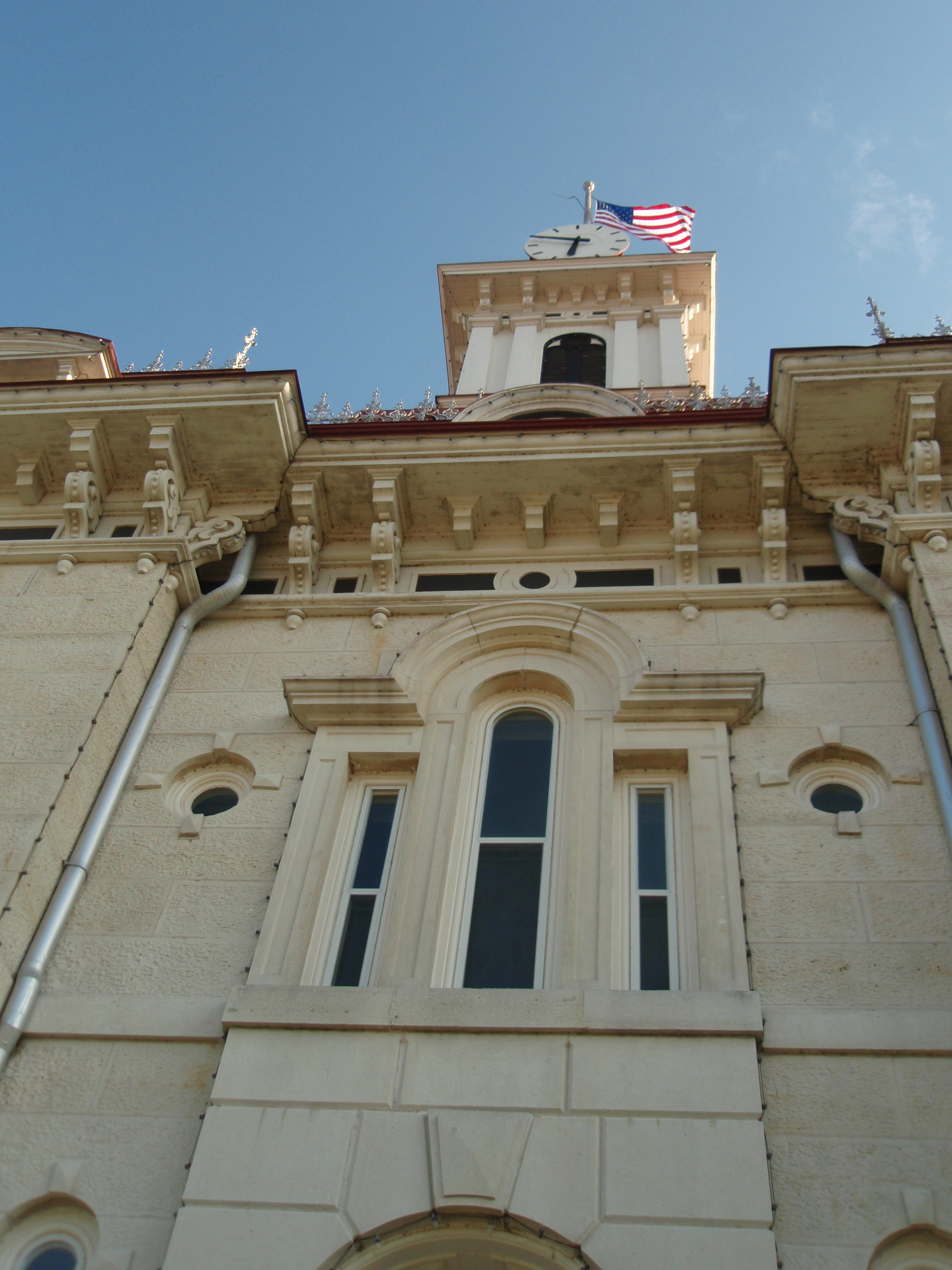
Close up view
