= Lower Fox Creek School =

- U.S. National Register of Historic Places
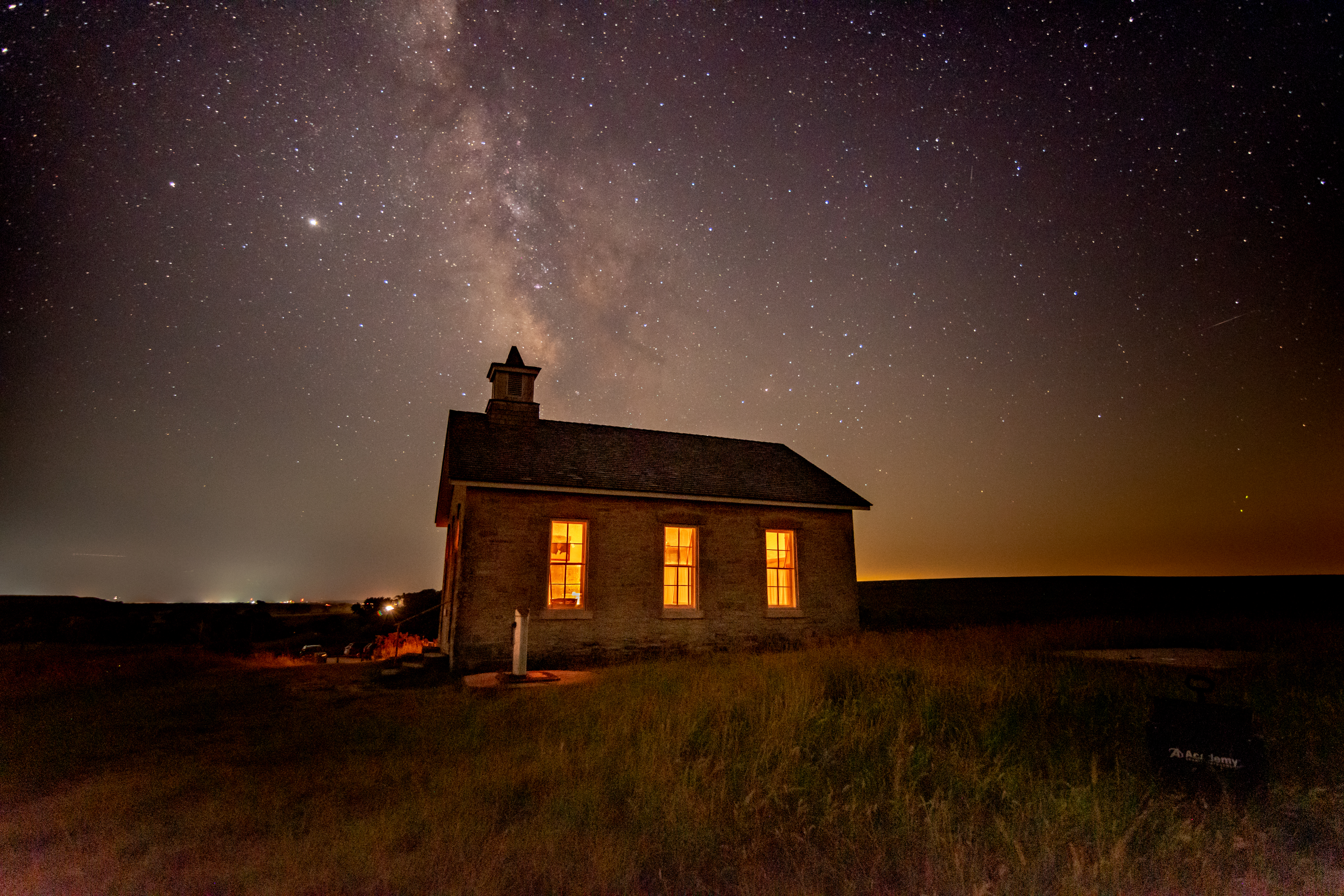
- Lower Fox Creek School

- Location within Kansas Location within the United States
- Nearest city: Strong City, Kansas
- Coordinates: 38.4409°N 96.5575°W
- NRHP reference No.: 74000822
- Added to NRHP: September 6, 1974

Lower Fox Creek School is a one-room schoolhouse that is part of the Tallgrass Prairie National Preserve near Strong City, Kansas, United States.

Constructed in 1882, and used for classes from 1884 to 1930, the 24 foot by 30 foot stone building with cypress woodwork and pine flooring is located on a site provided by rancher Steve F. Jones. Stonemason David Rettiger constructed the building using limestone from the nearby Barney Lantry quarries.

In 1946-1947 the school district dissolved and the property deed reverted to the ranch owner. The building was used as housing for the ranch and later hay storage. In 1968, local garden clubs sought permission from ranch owners, the Davis-Noland-Merrill Grain Company, to restore the building. After several years of restoration work, the building was listed on the National Register of Historic Places on September 6, 1974. In 1994, the property was purchased by the National Park Trust and on September 20, 2002, ownership of the schoolhouse and surrounding site was transferred to the National Park Service.
