= McNee Barns =

- U.S. National Register of Historic Places
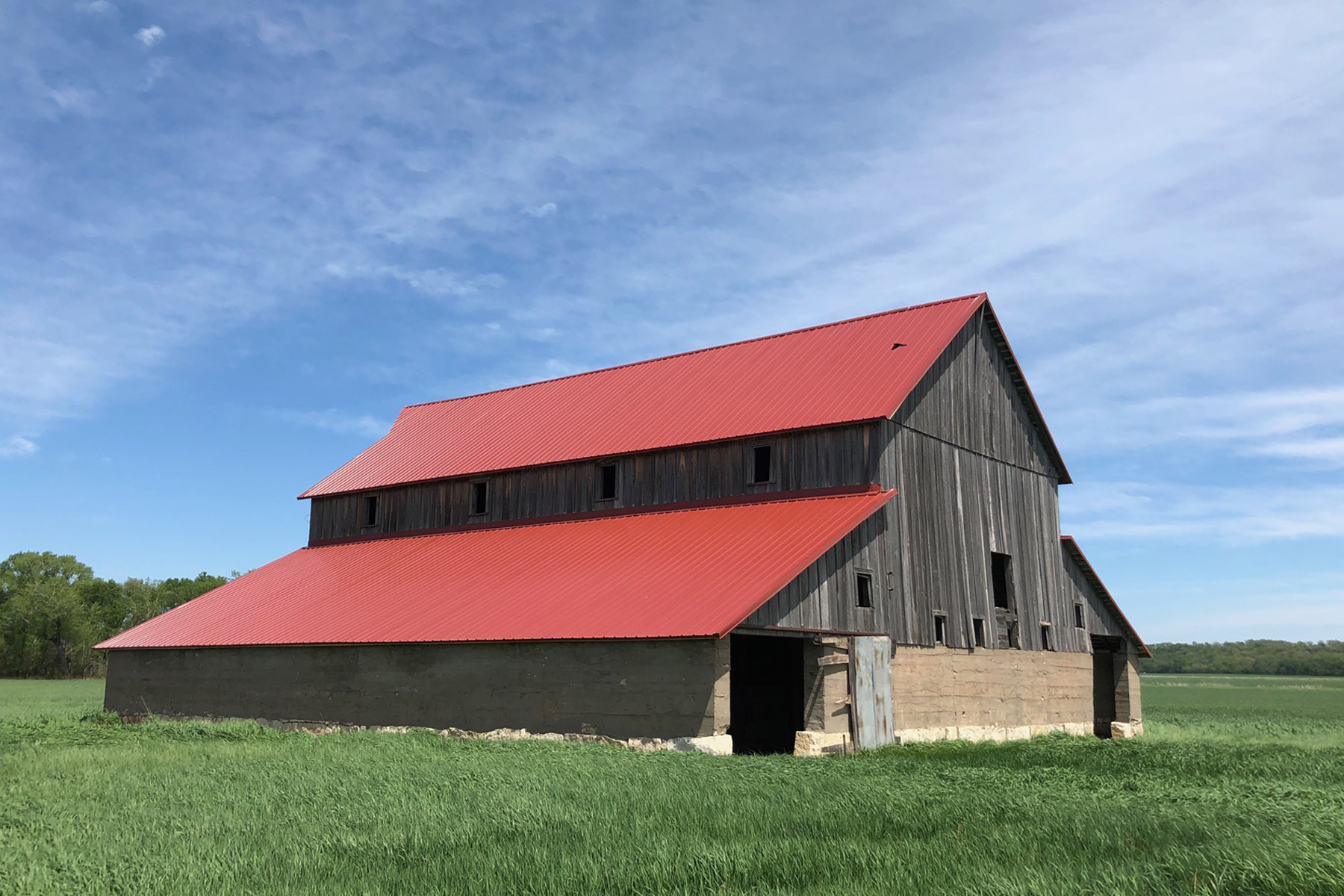
- The 1920 horse barn

- Location within Kansas
- Location: US 50 3 mi. SW of Elmdale, Kansas
- Coordinates: 38°20′15″N 96°40′47″W
- Area: 40 acres (16 ha)
- Built: c. 1920, c. 1948
- MPS: Agriculture-Related Resources of Kansas MPS
- NRHP reference No.: 13000431
- Added to NRHP: June 25, 2013

The McNee Barns are a pair of barns on a farm site along U.S. Route 50 3 miles (4.8 km) southwest of Elmdale, Chase County, Kansas. The site includes a horse barn built circa 1920 and a boxcar barn built circa 1948, along with a stone fence and an Aermotor windmill. The latter barn was built with disused boxcars from the Atchison, Topeka and Santa Fe Railway; such barns were common in the 1930s and 1940s, as poverty and war-related shortages inspired creative recycling of whatever was at hand. Four homesteaders settled the land in the 1860s, and the land passed through several hands before the Jeffrey family consolidated it into one property in 1896. After two more sales, Janet McNee took ownership of the farm in 1916; the McNee family has owned the property ever since and was responsible for building both barns. The family has rented the land to tenant farmers since they took ownership.

The barns were added to the National Register of Historic Places on June 25, 2013.
