= Pioneer Bluffs =

- Pioneer Bluffs Ranch Historic District
- U.S. National Register of Historic Places
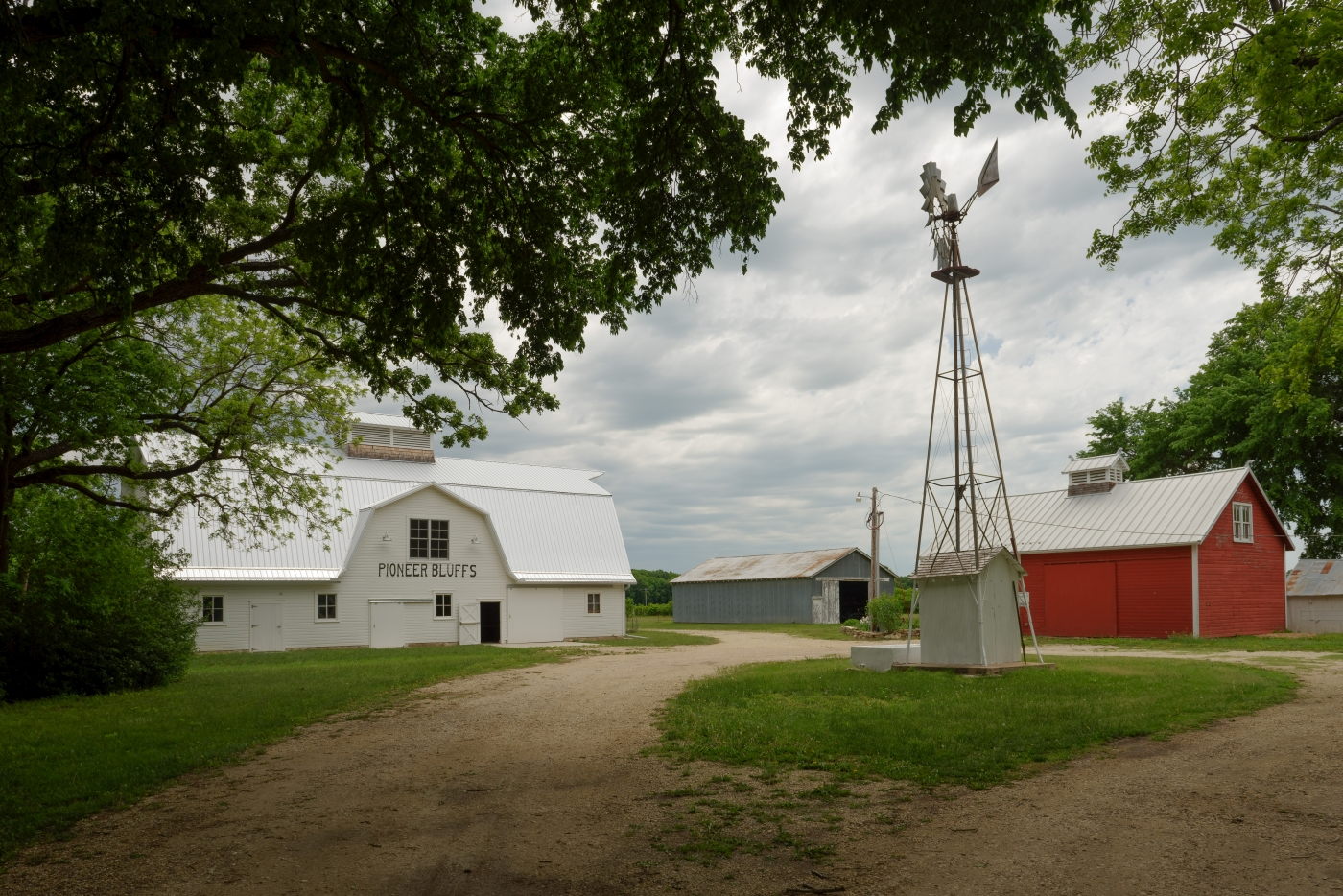
- Location: K-177 1 mi. N of Matfield Green, Kansas
- Area: 40 acres (16 ha)
- Built: 1908
- Built by: Charles Gross
- NRHP reference No.: 90001441
- Added to NRHP: September 13, 1990

Pioneer Bluffs is a historic ranch in Chase County, Kansas, located 1 mile (1.6 km) north of the city of Matfield Green. The ranch was settled in 1859 by Charles W. Rogler, who originally used the land for his farm. Rogler began ranching on the land in the late 1800s, and his son Henry rented pastures to owners bringing their herds through Chase County to market in the early twentieth century. The ranch is listed on the National Register of Historic Places and is currently a public museum.

== Description ==
The present-day ranch covers 40 acres (16 ha) of the original 160-acre (65 ha) farm established by Charles Rogler. At its peak, the ranch covered 4,020 acres (1,630 ha), most of which was used for grazing. The property has sixteen original buildings and structures from the ranch. The main buildings on the ranch are the 1908 farmhouse, a two-story structure with a Foursquare design, and the 1915 main barn, a two-story structure with a gambrel roof. The ranch also includes a granary, a chicken shed, the original farmhouse and barn from 1872, a windmill from the Aermotor Windmill Company, and several smaller outbuildings. A replica of Charles Rogler's original log cabin was built on the ranch in 1960.

== History ==
Charles W. Rogler, an Austrian immigrant who had previously lived in Ohio and Iowa, settled on the plot of land that would become Pioneer Bluffs in 1859. Rogler developed his land into a farm where he grew corn and orchard trees and raised cattle, pigs, and horses. He married Mary Satchel in 1869 and had five children, and continued to grow his land during his life. Upon his death in 1888, the property was managed by his friend Henry Brandley until his children were old enough to inherit it; by the time the children took over the land in 1900, it had grown to 4,020 acres (1,630 ha).

Rogler's son Henry, who acquired an agriculture degree from Kansas State Agricultural College in 1898, led the ranch's management in the twentieth century. He bought most of his siblings' holdings, ultimately gaining 2,720 acres (1,100 ha) acres of the original ranch, and began to take the ranch's business in new directions. At the time, nearby Bazaar had a branch station on the Atchison, Topeka and Santa Fe Railway that ranchers would use to ship their cattle to the Kansas City market. Rogler began renting his pastures to cattlemen who needed to store their cattle locally prior to shipment, becoming part of what was known as the transient cattle industry. He also acted as a middleman for other local landowners, connecting them with cattle owners in need of a pasture for a fee. Rogler also kept his own herd of Hereford cattle at the ranch and grew alfalfa, millet, and corn. He was also active in local politics, serving terms in the Kansas House of Representatives and Kansas Senate.

Henry Rogler's son Wayne also became a rancher, and he took over the ranch after Henry's retirement and death. Like his father, Wayne was elected to the Kansas House of Representatives and Senate.

The ranch was added to the National Register of Historic Places on September 13, 1990. It is currently open to the public as a ranching museum and heritage site.
