= Chase County Junior/Senior High School =

Location
- 600 Main Street; Cottonwood Falls, Kansas 66845; United States
- Coordinates: 38.372696°N 96.544526°W

Information
- School type: Public, High School
- School board: Board Website
- School district: Chase County USD 284
- CEEB code: 170685
- Principal: Alberto Carrillo
- Teaching staff: 14.63 (FTE)
- Grades: 7–12
- Gender: coed
- Enrollment: 170 (2023–2024)
- Student to teacher ratio: 11.62
- Campus type: rural
- Colors: Red; Black
- Athletics: Class 2A, District 5
- Athletics conference: Flint Hills League
- Mascot: Bulldog
- Communities served: Cottonwood Falls, Elmdale, Strong City, Cedar Point, Matfield Green, Bazaar, Clements, Saffordville
- Website: School district

Chase County Junior/Senior High School is a public secondary school in Cottonwood Falls, Kansas, United States. It is one of two schools operated by Chase County USD 284 school district.

== History ==
In 2010, the middle school building was closed in Strong City and the middle school moved to the existing high school building in Cottonwood Falls, thus renaming it.

== Extracurricular activities ==
Chase County Junior/Senior High School offers a variety of extracurricular activities for the students.

=== Athletics ===
The Bulldogs compete in the Flint Hills League and are classified as a 2A school.
A list of sports is listed below:

High School Boys

- Baseball
- Basketball
- Cross Country
- Football
- Track and Field
- Wrestling

High School Girls

- Basketball
- Cheerleading
- Cross Country
- Pom-Pom Dance Team
- Softball
- Track and Field
- Volleyball

Junior High Boys

- Basketball
- Football
- Track and Field
- Wrestling

Junior High Girls

- Basketball
- Cheerleading
- Track and Field
- Volleyball

=== Clubs and organizations ===
Chase County Junior/Senior High School offers a variety of clubs/organizations for the students. A list of clubs offered, are listed below:

- Band
- Cheer
- FBLA
- Forensics
- KAY Club (HS)
- KAY Club (JH)
- National Honor Society
- Newspaper
- Pom-Pon
- Quill and Scroll
- Scholar's Bowl
- Spanish Club
- Student Council (HS)
- Student Council (JH)
- Technology Student Association (TSA)
- Theatre
- Voices of CCHS
- Yearbook

== Notable alumni ==
- Ryan Kohlmeier, Former MLB player (Baltimore Orioles)

== See also ==
- List of high schools in Kansas
- List of unified school districts in Kansas
