= Cottonwood Falls, Kansas =

City in Chase County, Kansas, U.S.

- City and County seat
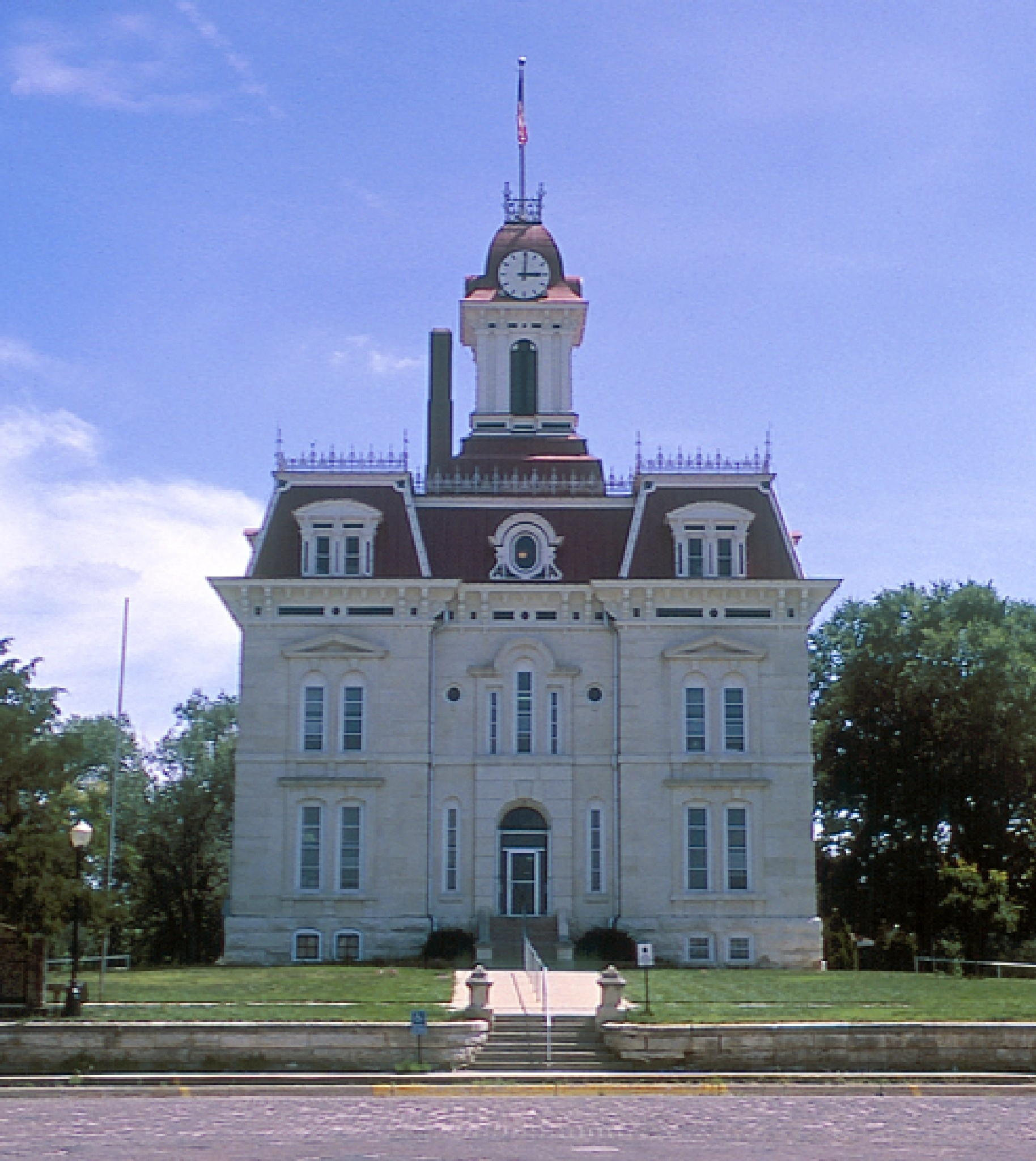
- Chase County Courthouse designed by Kansas State Capitol architect John G. Haskell

- Location within Chase County and Kansas

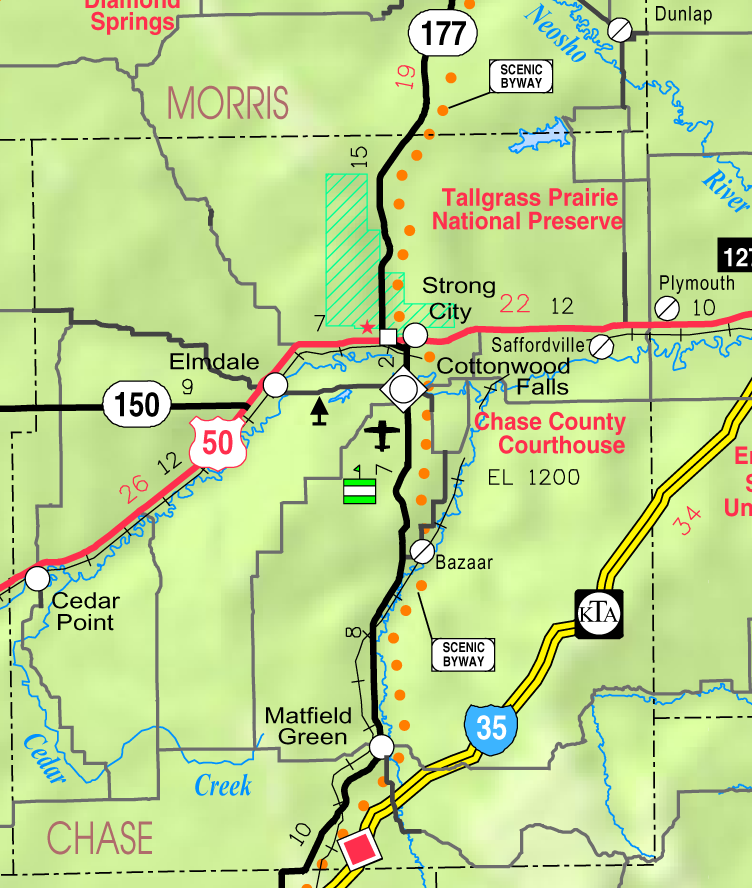
- KDOT map of Chase County (legend)
- Coordinates: 38°22′5″N 96°32′35″W
- Country: United States
- State: Kansas
- County: Chase
- Township: Falls
- Founded: 1859
- Incorporated: 1872
- Named for: Falls on Cottonwood River

Government
  - Type: Mayor–Council
  - Mayor: Buddy Sisson

Area
  - Total: 0.64 sq mi (1.65 km^{2})
  - Land: 0.63 sq mi (1.63 km^{2})
  - Water: 0.0039 sq mi (0.01 km^{2})
- Elevation: 1,207 ft (368 m)

Population (2020)
  - Total: 851
  - Density: 1,350/sq mi (522/km^{2})
- Time zone: UTC-6 (CST)
  - Summer (DST): UTC-5 (CDT)
- ZIP Code: 66845
- Area code: 620
- FIPS code: 20-15900
- GNIS ID: 477262
- Website: cwfks.org

Cottonwood Falls is the largest city in and the county seat of Chase County, Kansas, United States. As of the 2020 census, the population of the city was 851. It is located south of Strong City along the south side of the Cottonwood River.

== History ==
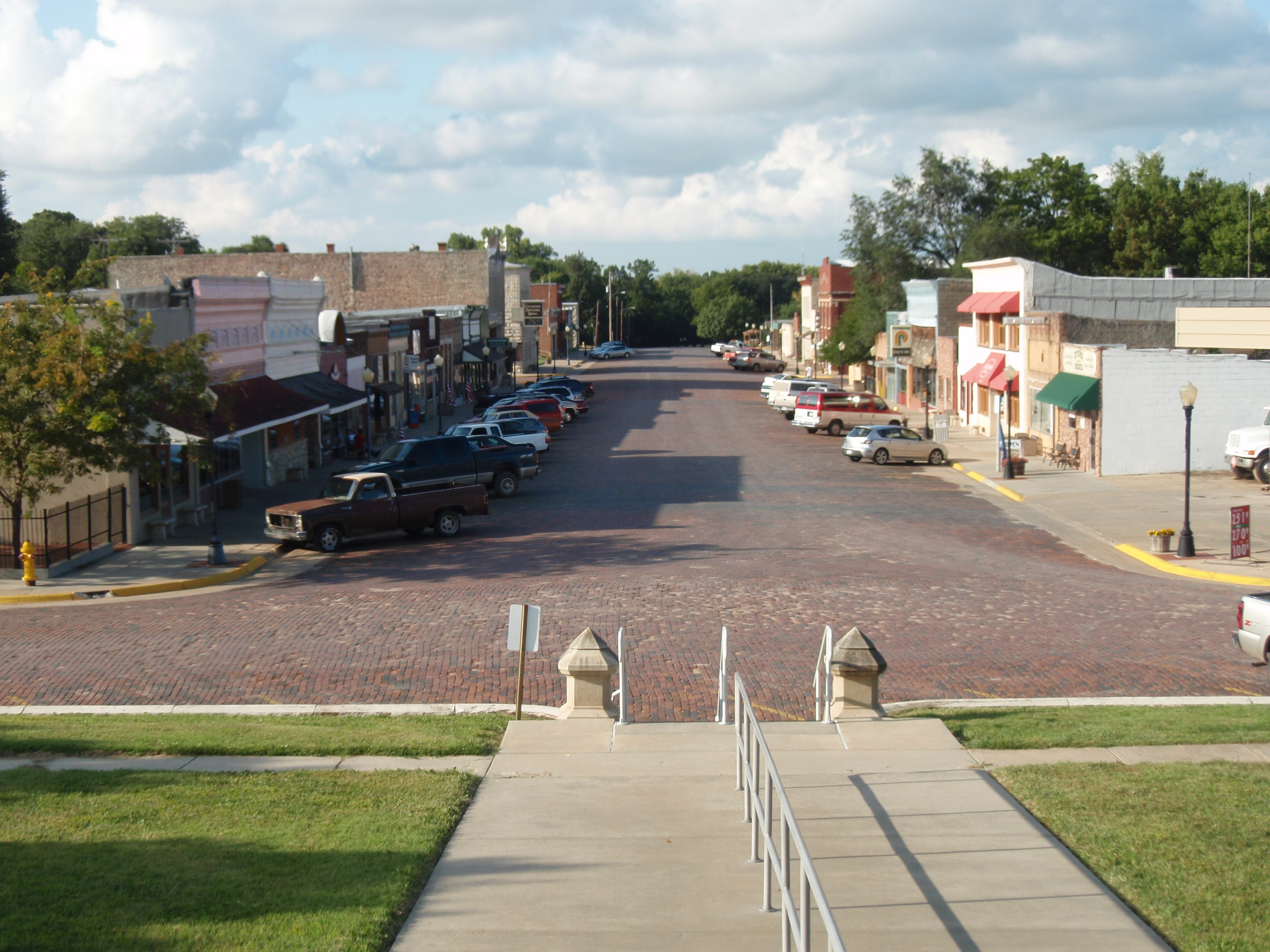
Looking northward toward the business district, as seen from Courthouse steps (2009)

=== Early history ===
For many millennia, the Great Plains of North America was inhabited by nomadic Native Americans. From the 16th century to 18th century, the Kingdom of France claimed ownership of large parts of North America. In 1762, after the French and Indian War, France secretly ceded New France to Spain, per the Treaty of Fontainebleau.

=== 19th century ===
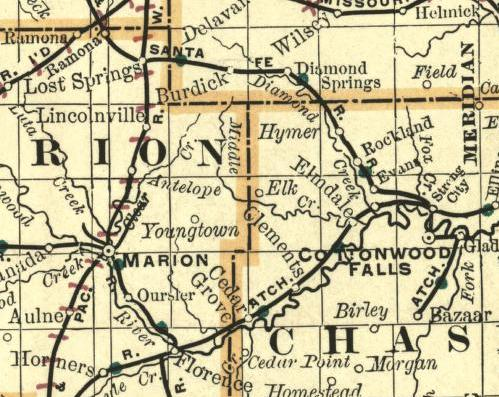
1893 railroad map

In 1802, Spain returned most of the land to France. In 1803, most of the land for modern day Kansas was acquired by the United States from France as part of the 828,000 square mile Louisiana Purchase for 2.83 cents per acre.

In 1854, the Kansas Territory was organized, then in 1861 Kansas became the 34th U.S. state. In 1859, Chase County was established within the Kansas Territory, which included the land for modern day Cottonwood Falls.

The first settlement in the area of Cottonwood Falls was in 1854, when an Indian trader named Seth Hayes founded a cattle ranch on the Cottonwood River close to the mouth of Diamond Spring Creek. The area around the town was organized as Chase County in 1859, and Cottonwood Falls was designated the temporary county seat. Other early settlers arrived in Cottonwood and surrounding lands in 1856 to 1858.

The first post office in Cottonwood Falls was established in 1858. In 1873 the city's French Renaissance style Chase County courthouse was built; at roughly the same time, the Atchison, Topeka and Santa Fe Railway reached Cottonwood Falls area. Through the late 19th and early 20th centuries the area around the city was mainly divided into farms and cattle ranches.

=== 20th century ===
In 1931, a Transcontinental & Western Air flight crashed ten miles south of Cottonwood Falls near the community of Bazaar, killing all eight on board, including University of Notre Dame football coach Knute Rockne. A monument to the crash is located on private property.

There have been numerous floods during the history of Cottonwood Falls. In June and July 1951, due to heavy rains, rivers and streams flooded numerous cities in Kansas, including Cottonwood Falls. Many reservoirs and levees were built in Kansas as part of a response to the Great Flood of 1951.

== Geography ==
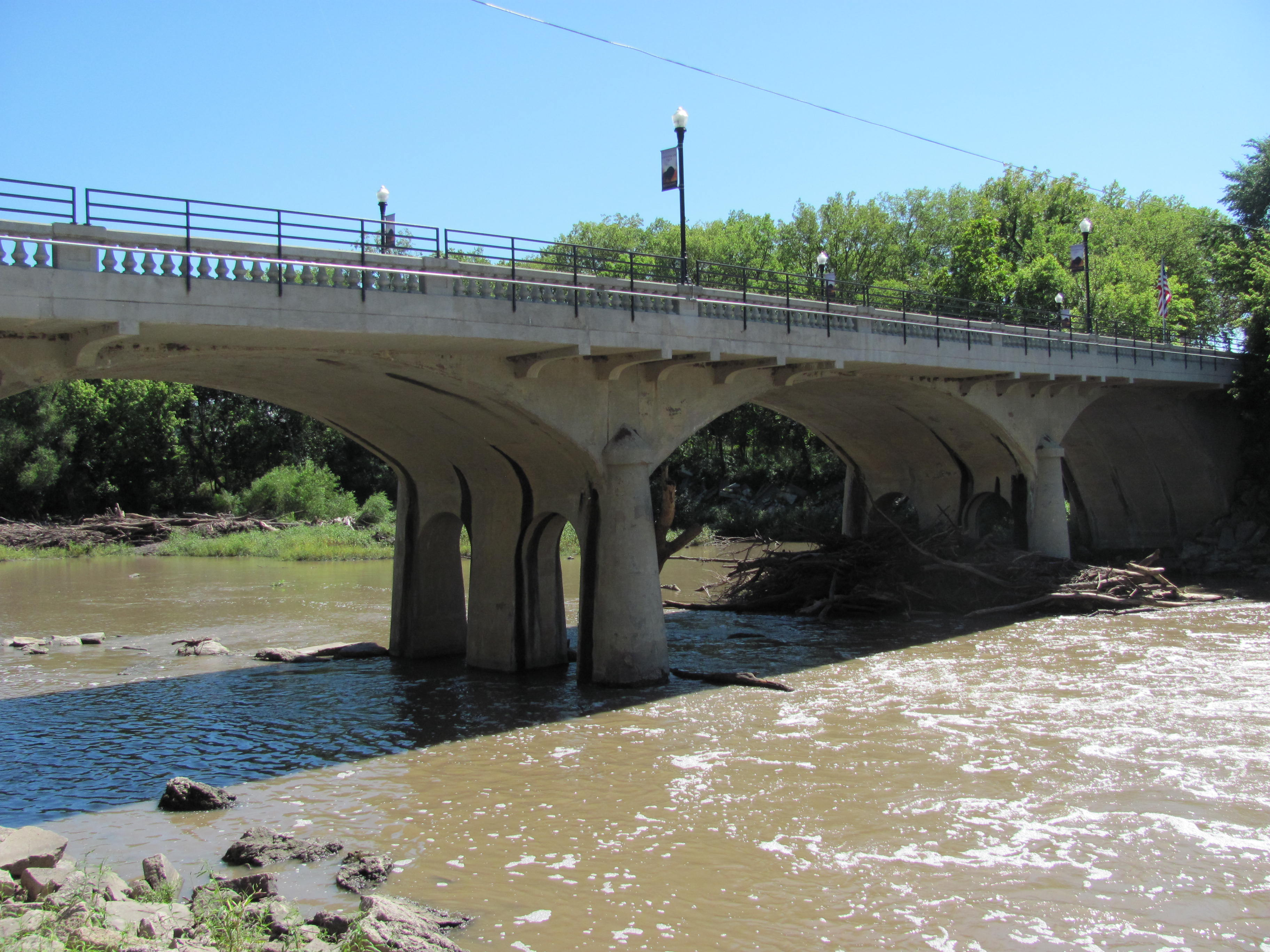
1914 bridge over Cottonwood River in Cottonwood Falls (2012)

Cottonwood Falls is located at 38°22′5″N 96°32′35″W (38.368159, -96.542918), in the scenic Flint Hills of the Great Plains. According to the United States Census Bureau, the city has a total area of 0.60 square miles (1.55 km^{2}), of which 0.59 square miles (1.53 km^{2}) is land and 0.01 square miles (0.03 km^{2}) is water.

=== Climate ===
The climate in this area is characterized by hot, humid summers and cool to cold winters. According to the Köppen Climate Classification system, Cottonwood Falls has a humid continental climate (Dfa) using the 0 °C (32 °F) isotherm, or a humid subtropical climate (Cfa) using the -3 °C (26.6 °F) isotherm. The hottest temperature recorded in Cottonwood Falls was 118 °F (47.8 °C) on July 18, 1936, while the coldest temperature recorded was −30 °F (−34.4 °C) on February 13, 1905.

Climate data for Cottonwood Falls, Kansas, 1991–2020 normals, extremes 1902–present
Month	Jan	Feb	Mar	Apr	May	Jun	Jul	Aug	Sep	Oct	Nov	Dec	Year
Record high °F (°C)	77 (25)	83 (28)	94 (34)	96 (36)	100 (38)	111 (44)	118 (48)	114 (46)	110 (43)	97 (36)	87 (31)	80 (27)	118 (48)
Mean maximum °F (°C)	64.8 (18.2)	70.3 (21.3)	80.3 (26.8)	86.3 (30.2)	90.0 (32.2)	94.7 (34.8)	100.7 (38.2)	100.0 (37.8)	95.1 (35.1)	87.6 (30.9)	75.8 (24.3)	66.1 (18.9)	101.9 (38.8)
Mean daily maximum °F (°C)	41.2 (5.1)	46.1 (7.8)	57.0 (13.9)	66.8 (19.3)	75.4 (24.1)	84.9 (29.4)	90.0 (32.2)	89.0 (31.7)	81.3 (27.4)	69.4 (20.8)	55.8 (13.2)	43.9 (6.6)	66.7 (19.3)
Daily mean °F (°C)	29.5 (−1.4)	33.8 (1.0)	43.9 (6.6)	54.0 (12.2)	64.2 (17.9)	73.8 (23.2)	78.7 (25.9)	77.0 (25.0)	68.6 (20.3)	56.1 (13.4)	43.4 (6.3)	32.8 (0.4)	54.7 (12.6)
Mean daily minimum °F (°C)	17.9 (−7.8)	21.5 (−5.8)	30.7 (−0.7)	41.3 (5.2)	53.0 (11.7)	62.6 (17.0)	67.3 (19.6)	65.1 (18.4)	56.0 (13.3)	42.9 (6.1)	30.9 (−0.6)	21.6 (−5.8)	42.6 (5.9)
Mean minimum °F (°C)	0.4 (−17.6)	5.0 (−15.0)	14.1 (−9.9)	26.2 (−3.2)	38.6 (3.7)	51.3 (10.7)	57.7 (14.3)	55.0 (12.8)	41.0 (5.0)	26.6 (−3.0)	15.8 (−9.0)	6.2 (−14.3)	−3.8 (−19.9)
Record low °F (°C)	−28 (−33)	−30 (−34)	−8 (−22)	10 (−12)	22 (−6)	40 (4)	42 (6)	40 (4)	28 (−2)	13 (−11)	−5 (−21)	−22 (−30)	−30 (−34)
Average precipitation inches (mm)	0.87 (22)	1.42 (36)	2.67 (68)	3.54 (90)	5.61 (142)	4.72 (120)	5.00 (127)	4.37 (111)	3.53 (90)	2.83 (72)	2.04 (52)	1.39 (35)	37.99 (965)
Average snowfall inches (cm)	4.0 (10)	1.3 (3.3)	1.3 (3.3)	0.2 (0.51)	0.0 (0.0)	0.0 (0.0)	0.0 (0.0)	0.0 (0.0)	0.0 (0.0)	0.3 (0.76)	0.4 (1.0)	3.1 (7.9)	10.6 (26.77)
Average precipitation days (≥ 0.01 in)	4.4	4.7	7.2	8.1	10.5	9.0	8.6	8.1	7.0	6.6	5.0	4.7	83.9
Average snowy days (≥ 0.1 in)	1.8	1.2	0.5	0.1	0.0	0.0	0.0	0.0	0.0	0.1	0.2	1.3	5.2
Source 1: NOAA
Source 2: National Weather Service

== Area events ==
- Prairie Fire Festival

== Area attractions ==
Cottonwood Falls has five listings on the National Register of Historic Places (NRHP).

- Cartter Building (NRHP).
- Chase County Courthouse (NRHP). It is the oldest courthouse in continual use in the state of Kansas and one of the oldest in continual use West of the Mississippi.
- Chase County National Bank (NRHP).
- Cottonwood River Bridge (NRHP).
- Samuel N Wood House (NRHP).
- Kansas Historical Marker - A Landmark Of Distinction, located in courthouse square.
- Chase Lake Falls

== Demographics ==
Historical population
Census	Pop.	Note	%±
1880	518		—
1890	770		48.6%
1900	842		9.4%
1910	899		6.8%
1920	1,044		16.1%
1930	963		−7.8%
1940	1,078		11.9%
1950	957		−11.2%
1960	971		1.5%
1970	987		1.6%
1980	954		−3.3%
1990	889		−6.8%
2000	966		8.7%
2010	903		−6.5%
2020	851		−5.8%
U.S. Decennial Census

Cottonwood Falls is part of the Emporia Micropolitan Statistical Area.

=== 2020 census ===
The 2020 United States census counted 851 people, 318 households, and 179 families in Cottonwood Falls. The population density was 1,321.4 per square mile (510.2/km^{2}). There were 395 housing units at an average density of 613.4 per square mile (236.8/km^{2}). The racial makeup was 77.32% (658) white or European American (75.56% non-Hispanic white), 1.88% (16) black or African-American, 0.24% (2) Native American or Alaska Native, 0.94% (8) Asian, 0.24% (2) Pacific Islander or Native Hawaiian, 14.92% (127) from other races, and 4.47% (38) from two or more races. Hispanic or Latino of any race was 17.74% (151) of the population.

Of the 318 households, 23.0% had children under the age of 18; 45.0% were married couples living together; 30.5% had a female householder with no spouse or partner present. 40.9% of households consisted of individuals and 22.6% had someone living alone who was 65 years of age or older. The average household size was 2.2 and the average family size was 2.7. The percent of those with a bachelor's degree or higher was estimated to be 18.4% of the population.

16.5% of the population was under the age of 18, 7.2% from 18 to 24, 28.6% from 25 to 44, 24.2% from 45 to 64, and 23.6% who were 65 years of age or older. The median age was 41.9 years. For every 100 females, there were 78.0 males. For every 100 females ages 18 and older, there were 78.2 males.

The 2016–2020 5-year American Community Survey estimates show that the median household income was $40,739 (with a margin of error of +/- $6,271) and the median family income was $56,667 (+/- $13,166). Males had a median income of $29,750 (+/- $5,519) versus $26,438 (+/- $4,200) for females. The median income for those above 16 years old was $28,000 (+/- $3,976). Approximately, 4.7% of families and 6.4% of the population were below the poverty line, including 12.3% of those under the age of 18 and 3.7% of those ages 65 or over.

=== 2010 census ===
As of the census of 2010, there were 903 people, 342 households, and 205 families residing in the city. The population density was 1,530.5 inhabitants per square mile (590.9/km^{2}). There were 414 housing units at an average density of 701.7 per square mile (270.9/km^{2}). The racial makeup of the city was 93.9% White, 3.4% African American, 0.2% Asian, 1.1% from other races, and 1.3% from two or more races. Hispanic or Latino of any race were 7.0% of the population.

There were 342 households, of which 28.7% had children under the age of 18 living with them, 46.8% were married couples living together, 9.4% had a female householder with no husband present, 3.8% had a male householder with no wife present, and 40.1% were non-families. 37.1% of all households were made up of individuals, and 21.7% had someone living alone who was 65 years of age or older. The average household size was 2.22 and the average family size was 2.92.

The median age in the city was 43.3 years. 20.2% of residents were under the age of 18; 8.7% were between the ages of 18 and 24; 24.9% were from 25 to 44; 23.1% were from 45 to 64; and 23.3% were 65 years of age or older. The gender makeup of the city was 49.8% male and 50.2% female.

== Government ==
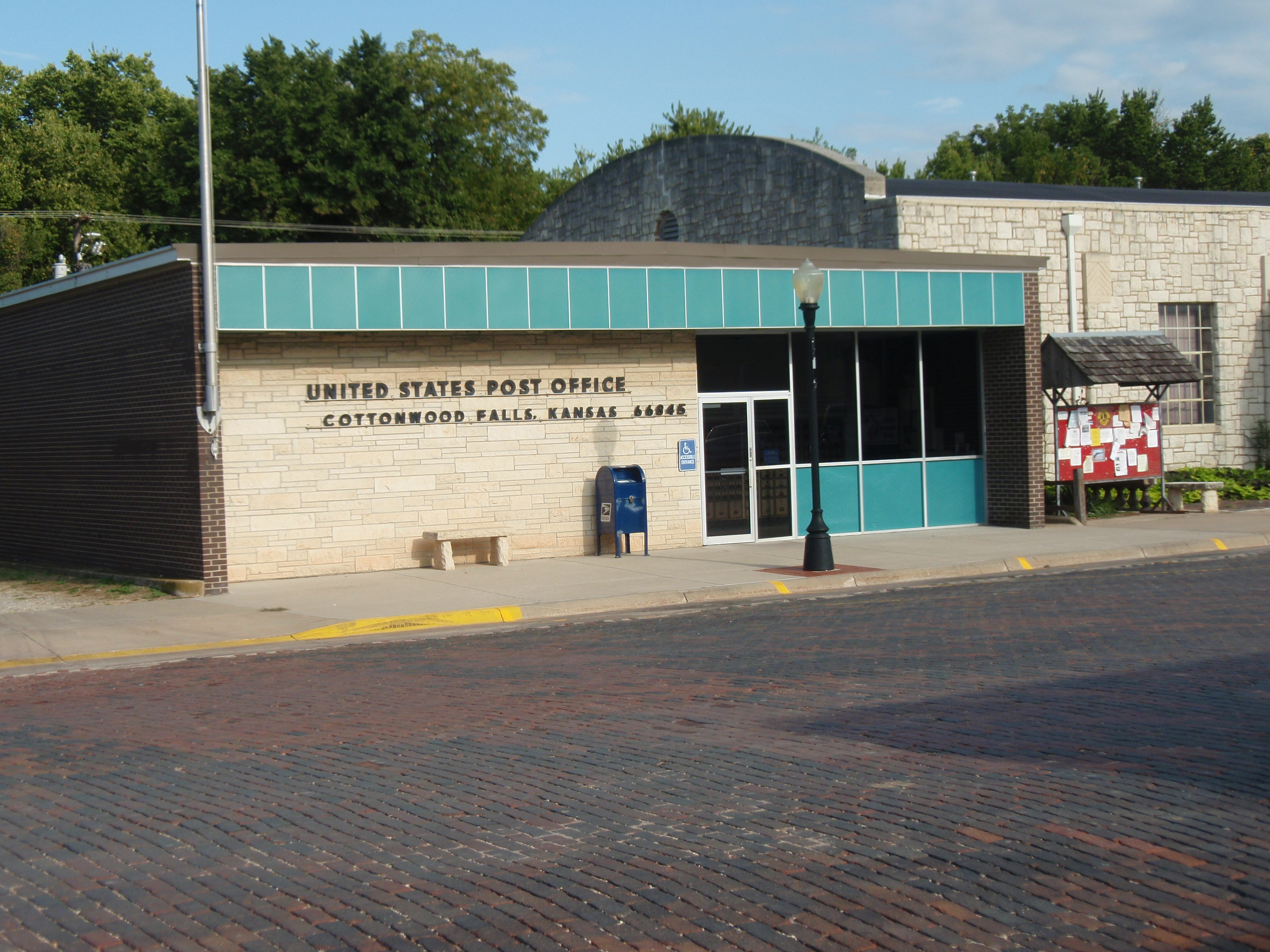
U.S. Post Office in Cottonwood Falls (2009)

=== City ===
The Cottonwood Falls government consists of a mayor and five council members; the council meets the first and third Monday of each month at 7:00 p.m. City Council Members are elected in odd-numbered years and serve four-year terms.

- City Hall, 220 Broadway St.

=== County ===
- Chase County Courthouse, Broadway St.
- Chase County Sheriff Department, 201 Walnut St.
- Chase County Fire Department, 201 Walnut.

=== U.S. ===
- U.S. Post Office, 206 Broadway St.
- U.S. Consolidated Farm Service Agency, 219 Broadway St.
- National Park Service (U.S. Dept of Interior), 226 Broadway St.

== Education ==
=== Primary and secondary education ===
The community is served by Chase County USD 284 public school district. It has two schools.

- Chase County Junior/Senior High School, 600 Main St.
- Chase County Elementary School, 410 Palmer St., Strong City, Kansas. The former elementary school building in Cottonwood Falls closed in 2018 and is now located in neighboring Strong City.

The Chase County High School mascot is Chase County Bulldogs.

The former Cottonwood Falls High School mascot was Cottonwood Falls Wildcats.

=== Library ===
- Burnley Memorial Library, 401 Oak St.

== Infrastructure ==
=== Transportation ===
K-177 highway passes north–south through the city. Chase County Airport, FAA:9K0, located south-east of 8th St and Airport Rd.

=== Utilities ===
- Internet
  - Satellite Internet is provided by HughesNet, StarBand, WildBlue.
- TV
  - Satellite TV is provided by DirecTV, Dish Network.
  - Free over-the-air ATSC digital TV.

== Gallery ==
- Historic Images of Cottonwood Falls, Special Photo Collections at Wichita State University Library.
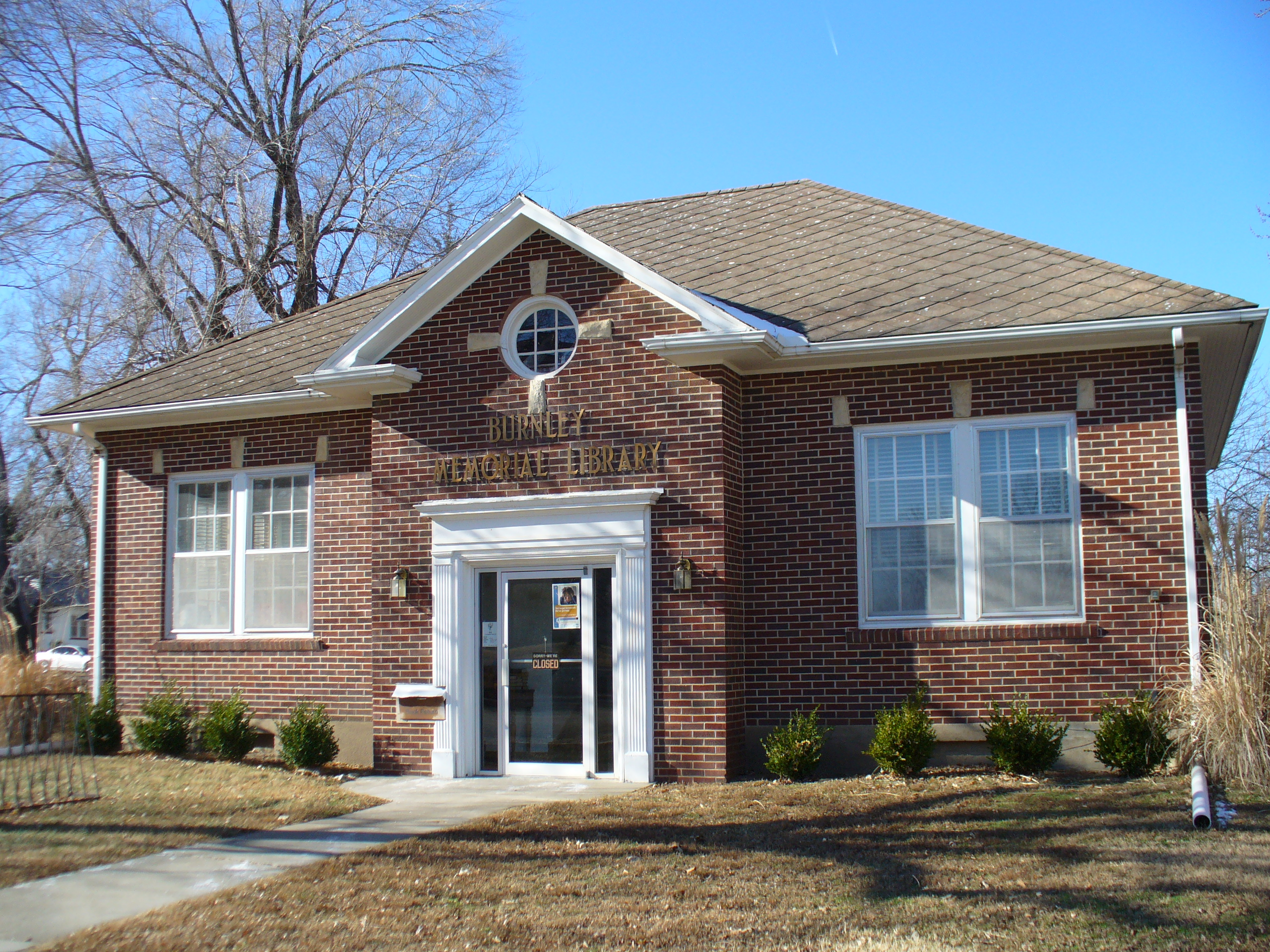
Burnley Memorial Library, 2006

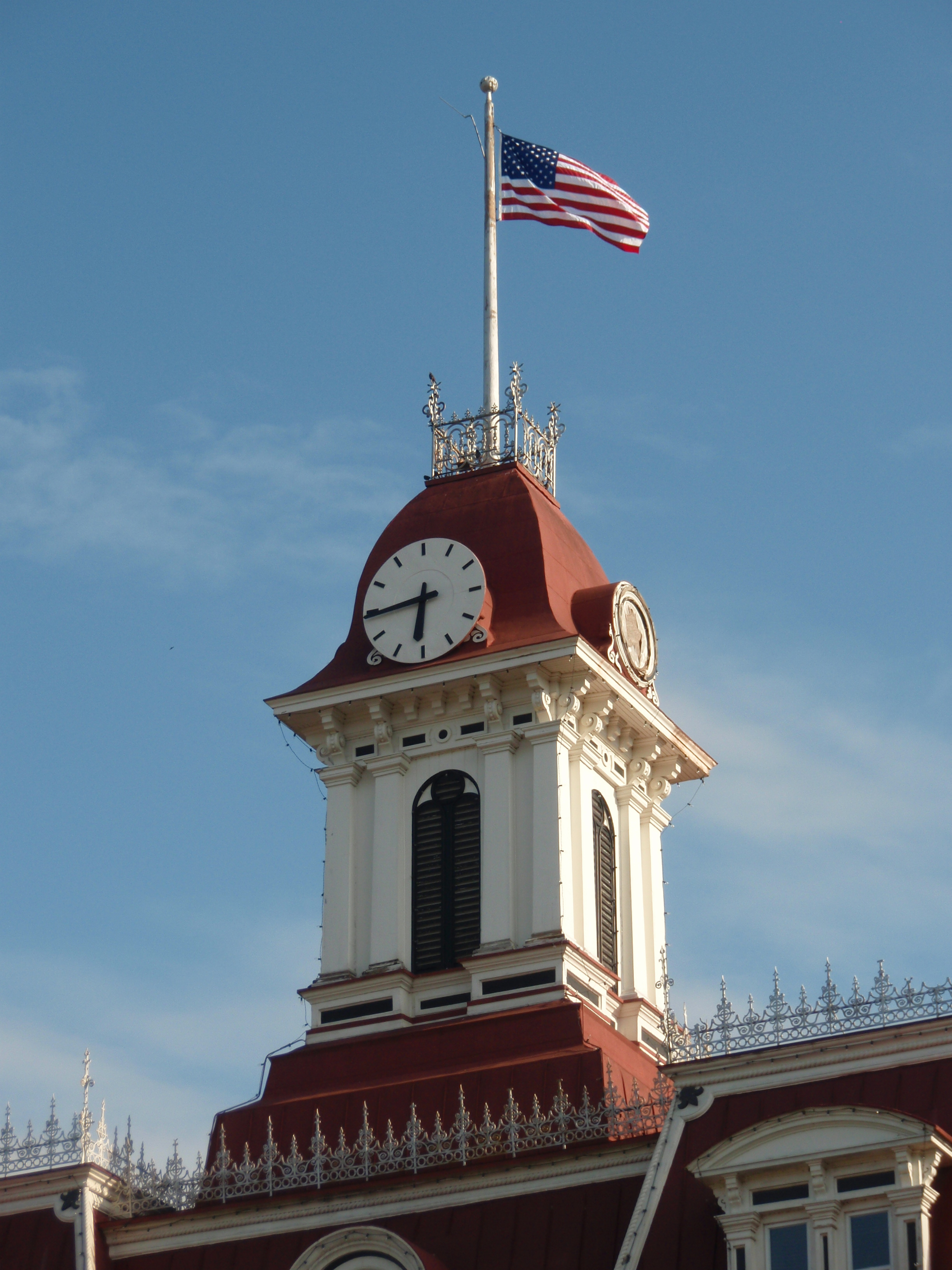
Courthouse Clock Tower, 2009

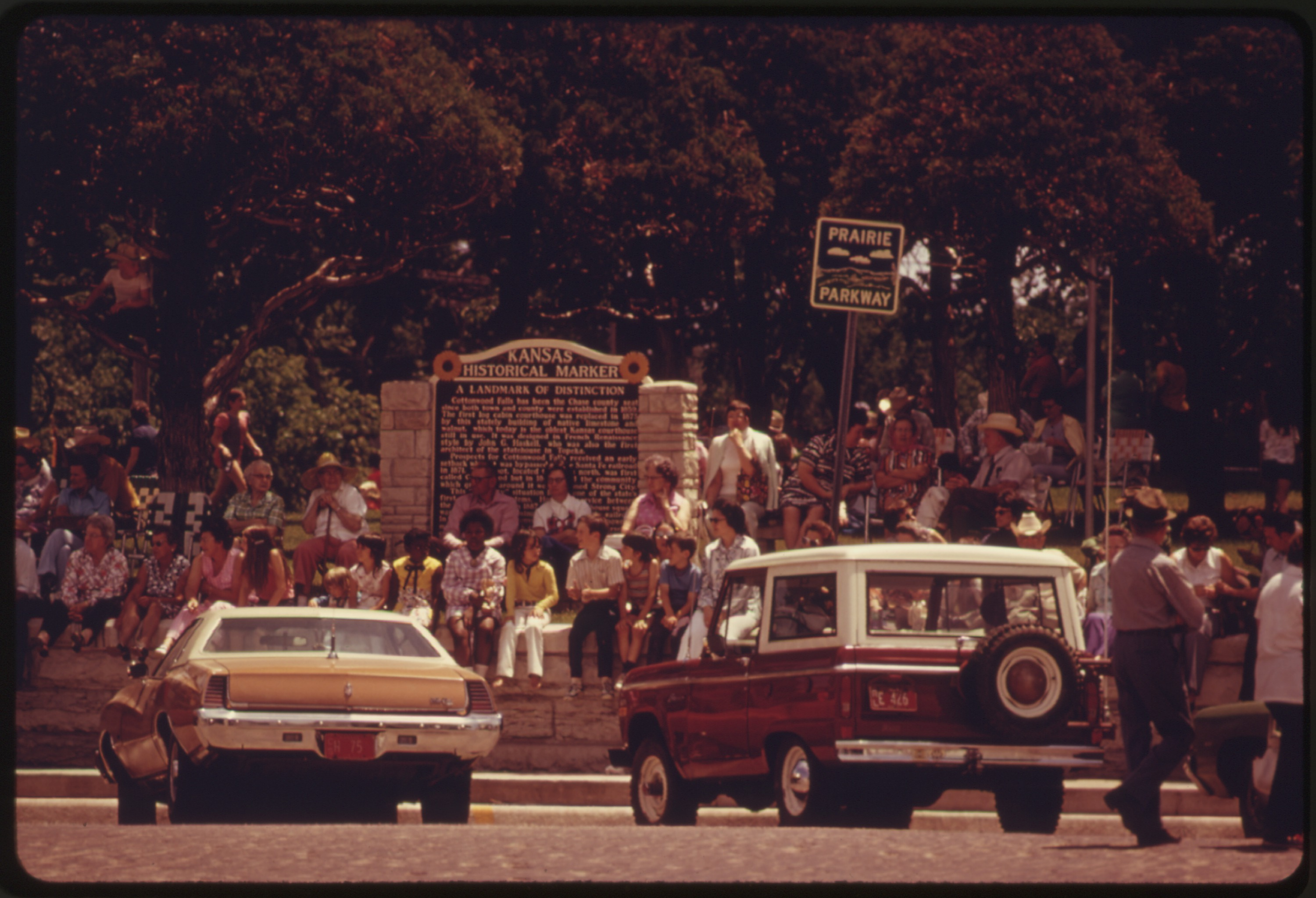
People congregate in the town square during a parade in June 1974

== Notable people ==
- Dudley Doolittle (1881–1957), U.S. Representative from Kansas, lawyer, banker
- Harley Martin (1880–1951), Wisconsin state legislator and farmer
- William Morgan (1866–1932), newspaper publisher and editor, author, lieutenant governor of Kansas 1915–19
- Samuel Wood (1825–1891), was an American attorney and Kansas politician

== Fiction ==
In Disney's 1985 film Return to Oz, Doctor J.B. Worley's clinic is set in Chase County near Cottonwood Falls.

In the 2005 film Jarhead, PFC Fergus O'Donnell is from Cottonwood.

The NBC crime drama The Blacklist season 8, episode 13 "Anne" is set and was partially filmed in Cottonwood Falls.

In the Great Railway Adventures book, The Mighty Mogul, Cottonwood Falls serves as a stop for the titular train during its journey to find supplies to build a new schoolhouse.

== See also ==
- Strong City, Kansas, approximately 0.5 mile north of Cottonwood Falls
- Chase County Junior/Senior High School
- National Register of Historic Places listings in Chase County, Kansas
  - Chase County Courthouse
- Cottonwood River and Great Flood of 1951
