= Atlantic Aircraft =

American aircraft manufacturer (1924–1930)

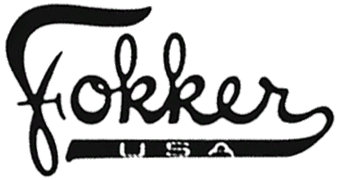

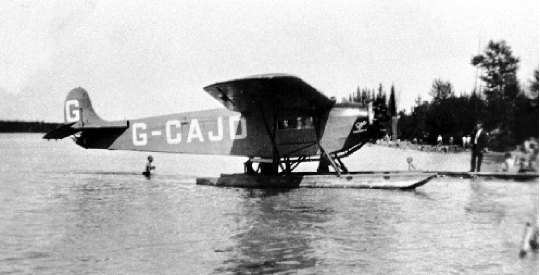
- A Fokker Universal from Western Canada Airways, c.1928
- Industry: Aerospace
- Founded: 1924
- Founders: Anthony Fokker
- Successor: North American Aviation
- Headquarters: United States
- Key people: Robert B.C. Noorduyn; Lorillard S. Spencer
- Parent: General Motors (1929–30)

Atlantic Aircraft Corporation, also known as Fokker-America and Atlantic-Fokker, was a US subsidiary of the Dutch Fokker company, responsible for sales and information about Fokker imports, and eventually constructing various Fokker designs.

== History ==
In 1920 Anthony Fokker had established the Netherlands Aircraft Manufacturing Company of Amsterdam as his American sales office. The company's representatives were Robert B. C. Noorduyn and Frits Cremer, a friend and test pilot for Anthony Fokker since before World War I. They successfully sold aircraft imported from Europe in the United States. But Fokker's typical construction of wooden wings and a steel-tube fuselage, both covered with fabric, also attracted the attention of the US Army. This resulted in an order to equip their De Havilland DH.4s with steel fuselages. The only restriction was that these had to be manufactured in the United States, therefore, Fokker purchased the Wittemann-Lewis factory in 1923 and founded the Atlantic Aircraft Corporation in May 1924. The company was based in Hasbrouck Heights, New Jersey, and Teterboro, New Jersey. Lorillard Spencer became the president and Robert B. C. Noorduyn the general manager.

The Netherlands Aircraft Manufacturing Company was succeeded by the Fokker Aircraft Corporation, which held the license rights of the Fokker designs and remained responsible for selling the aircraft from the Dutch Fokker factory. In September 1925, the Fokker Aircraft Corporation took over the stocks and orders of the Atlantic Aircraft Corporation, which since then had become a full subsidiary of it. In 1925 the company also began to manufacture one of Noorduyn's own designs, the Fokker Universal.

In 1927 the Fokker Aircraft Corporation of America was founded, which took over the Fokker Aircraft Corporation. A factory at Passaic, New Jersey, was added in 1927, and another at Glen Dale, West Virginia, in August 1928. Although the company had changed its name, many of its products continued to be referred to as "Atlantic" or "Atlantic Fokker" for some years.

Fokker Aircraft Company of America became a subsidiary of General Motors which acquired a 40 percent holding in May 1929, but ended operations the following year as a combination of the effect of the Great Depression and bad publicity surrounding the 1931 crash of a Transcontinental & Western Air Fokker F-10 that killed celebrated football coach Knute Rockne. Fokker ended his association with the American company in 1931. General Motors renamed their aviation subsidiary General Aviation Manufacturing Corporation, which in turn became part of North American Aviation in 1934.

== Aircraft ==
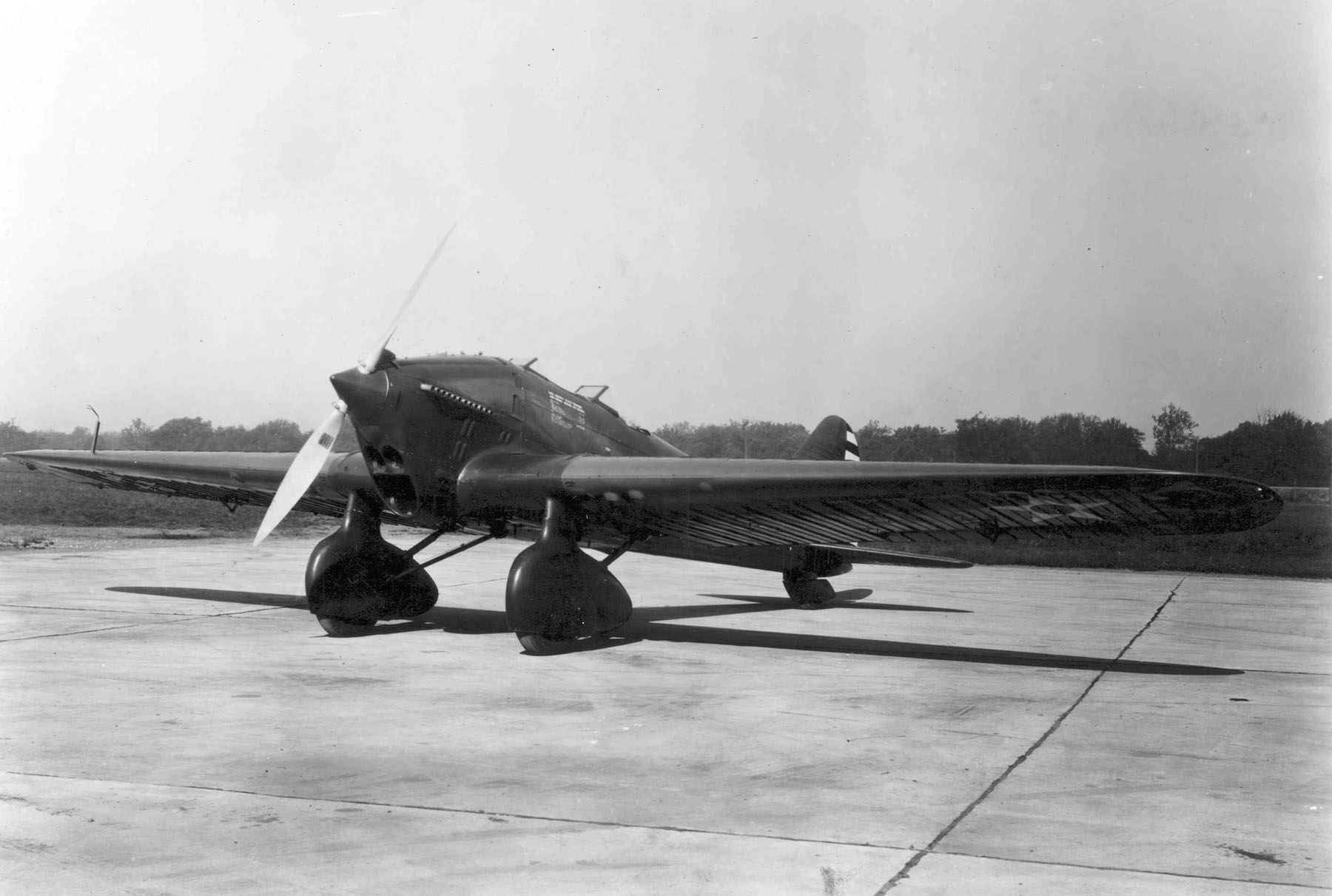
An Atlantic-Fokker XA-7

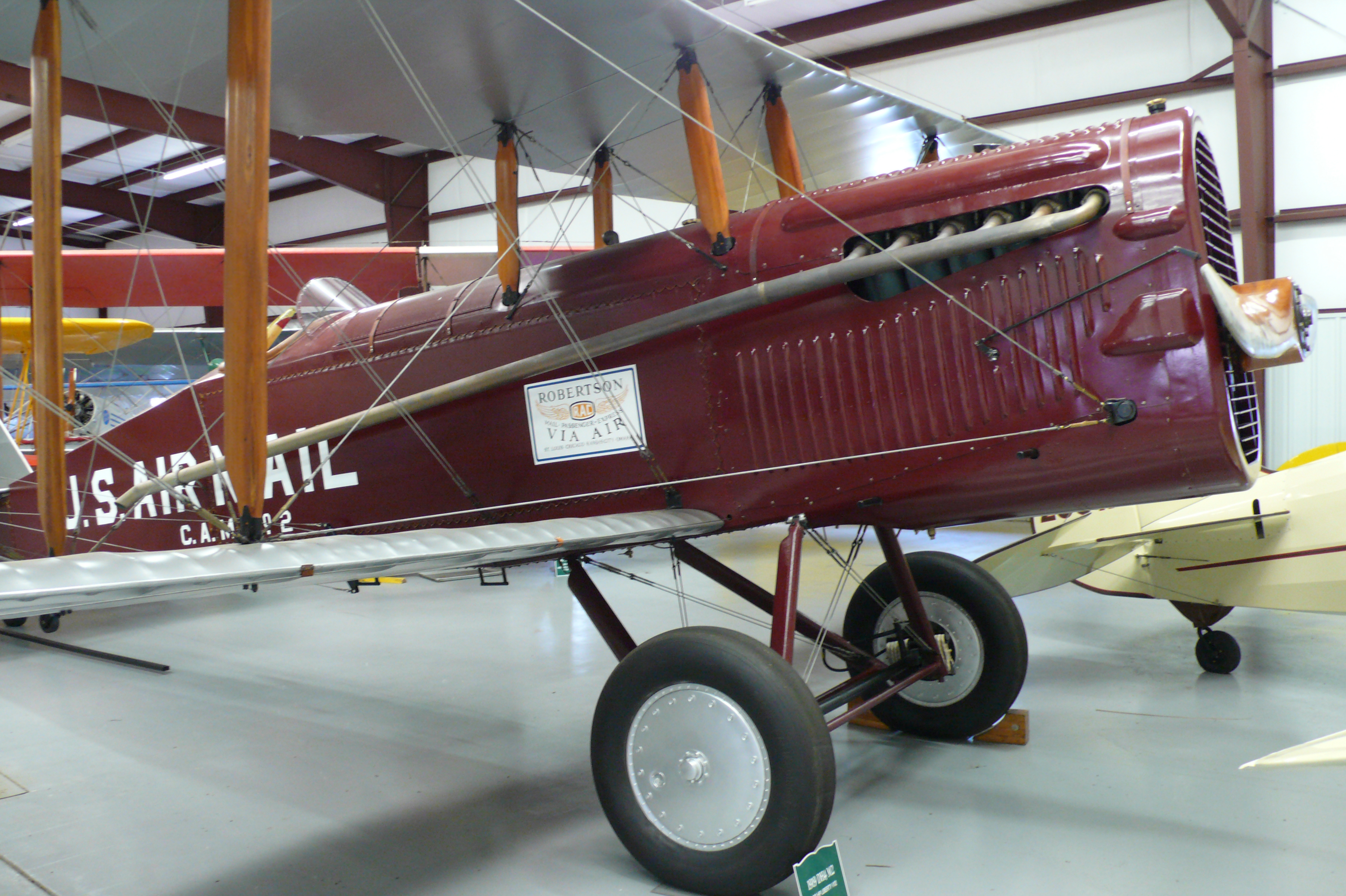
An Atlantic DH-4M-2 at the Historic Aircraft Restoration Museum

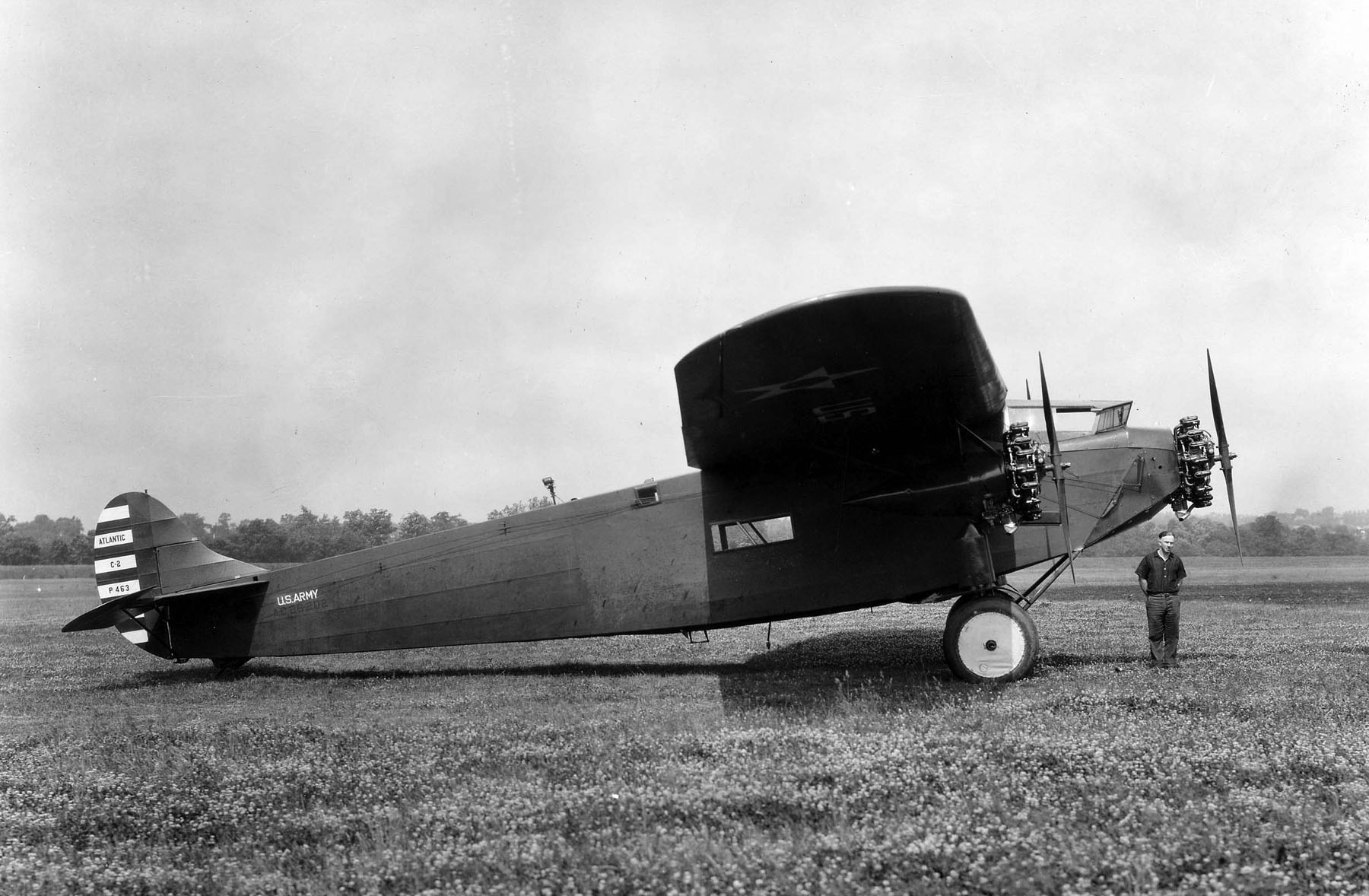
The Atlantic-Fokker C-2 Bird of Paradise

Model name	First flight	Number built	Type
Atlantic Model 1		130	License built version of Airco DH.4
Atlantic Model 2		1	Imported Fokker S.III
Atlantic Model 3		8	License built version of Fokker C.IV
Atlantic Model 4		44	Single engine airliner
Atlantic Model 5		1	Prototype light bomber version of Fokker C-7
Atlantic Model 6			License built version of Fokker F.VII
Atlantic Model 7		24	License built version of Fokker F.VII
Atlantic Model 8	1928	~200	Single engine airliner
Atlantic Model 9	1928	6	Single engine air yacht
Atlantic Model 10		65	Trimotor airliner
Atlantic Model 11		1	Experimental single engine cabin monoplane
Atlantic Model 12	1929	7	Four engine push-pull airliner
Atlantic Model 13		1	Prototype single engine monoplane
Atlantic Fokker AF-14	1929		Single engine airliner
Atlantic Fokker AF-15	1933	5	Twin engine search and rescue flying boat
Atlantic Fokker AF-16		1	Prototype twin engine bomber
Atlantic Fokker AF-17	1931	1	Prototype single engine attack airplane
Atlantic Fokker AF-18	1932	1	Prototype single engine fighter
Atlantic XHB-2	N/A	0	Unbuilt heavy bomber (1926)
General Aviation GA-43	1932	5	Single engine airliner
