= James Heathman =

American farmer

James Easter Heathman (April 7, 1917 – January 29, 2008) was an American farmer and U.S. Army veteran, who, as a teenager in 1931, witnessed and discovered the crash of a Transcontinental & Western Air airliner, which killed eight people, most notably University of Notre Dame football coach Knute Rockne. Heathman, who was 13 years old at the time he discovered the plane crash with his father on March 31, 1931, was the last living witness to the plane crash. Heathman later became a Knute Rockne historian and often led free tours of Notre Dame fans to the site of the crash, especially during the last 20 years of his life.

== The Knute Rockne crash ==
Heathman was just 13 years old, one week shy of his fourteenth birthday, when he had heard the TWA airliner flying low over his farm. A telephone operator called Heathman's family shortly afterwards to inform them that there had been an airplane crash nearby. Heathman, along with his father and his brothers, raced in the family's Model T to the site of the crash, which is located three miles southwest of the town of Bazaar, Kansas. Heathman found the plane's tail sticking out of the ground, as well as the bodies of the crash victims, including Rockne. They stayed at the scene until the coroner arrived to remove the crash victims. Heathman's son, Tom, later described the event as very traumatic for his father.

Heathman reportedly did not talk about the crash much with his family until the last two decades of his life. However, during his life Heathman became a dedicated fan of the University of Notre Dame and the life of Knute Rockne. He often led free tours to the crash site and memorial to honor Rockne and the others killed in the crash. Heathman's tours became a must-do pilgrimage for hundreds of University of Notre Dame alumni and football fans over the years. Many who took the tour came to Kansas to hear Heathman's first hand account of his discovery of Rockne's plane.

Heathman was honored by the University of Notre Dame for his dedication to the school and the memory of Rockne. He received an honorary monogram from Notre Dame in 2006 at a pep rally held at Notre Dame Stadium attended by students and fans. The event honoring Heathman coincided with the 75th anniversary of Rockne's death. He often showed off autographed Notre Dame footballs which were given to him by coaches Lou Holtz and Charlie Weis.

Despite his fame among those dedicated to Notre Dame, Heathman remained modest. In his last interview, which he gave to the Chicago Tribune in December 2007, he stated, "I'm not a celebrity. I'm just an older farmer."

On Saturday, April 2, 2011, a group gathered at the crash site. In attendance were Heathman's son and Rockne's grandson.

== Death ==
Heathman died of pneumonia in a hospital in Emporia, Kansas, on January 29, 2008, at the age of 90. He had previously said in an interview that his one regret was that he had not met Knute Rockne in person.
