= Bazaar Township, Kansas =

Bazaar Township
- Township
- Location within Chase County

- Location within the state of Kansas
- Coordinates: 38°15′10″N 096°29′31″W
- Country: United States
- State: Kansas
- County: Chase

Area
  - Total: 113 sq mi (293 km^{2})
  - Land: 112.9 sq mi (292.5 km^{2})
  - Water: 0.19 sq mi (0.5 km^{2}) 0.17%
- Elevation: 1,368 ft (417 m)

Population (2000)
  - Total: 81
  - Density: 0.78/sq mi (0.3/km^{2})
- GNIS feature ID: 0477413

Bazaar Township is a township in Chase County, Kansas, United States. As of the 2000 census, its population was 81.

== Geography ==
Bazaar Township covers an area of 113.13 square miles (293.0 km^{2}). The streams of Baker Creek, Den Creek, East Branch Sharpes Creek, Folsom Creek, Kirk Creek, Nickel Creek, Norton Creek, Rock Creek, Sharpes Creek and Yeager Creek run through this township.

In what remains of the community of Bazaar, the Bazaar United Methodist Church continues to hold weekly worship services at 8:30 each Sunday morning except for the first weekend in June when Chase County churches meet at the Strong City Rodeo grounds for Cowboy Church.

== Communities ==
The township contains the following settlements:

- Unincorporated community of Bazaar.

== Cemeteries ==
The township contains the following cemeteries:

- Bazaar.

== See also ==
- 1931 Transcontinental & Western Air Fokker F-10 crash, known as the "Knute Rockne plane crash"
