= Fokker XHB-2 =

Proposed American heavy bomber

General information
- Type: Heavy bomber
- National origin: United States
- Manufacturer: Fokker Aircraft Corporation of America
- Status: project only
- Number built: 0

The Fokker XHB-2 was a proposed heavy bomber envisaged by the Fokker Aircraft Corporation of America in 1927. The leadership of the United States Army Air Corps found the XHB-2 design too radical to be a real proposition, so the design remained a paper project only.

== Specifications ==
Data from

General characteristics

- Crew: 5
- Length: 71 ft 3 in (21.72 m)
- Wingspan: 108 ft 4 in (33.02 m)
- Wing area: 1,600 sq ft (150 m^{2})
- Empty weight: 12,054 lb (5,468 kg)
- Gross weight: 24,487 lb (11,107 kg)
- Fuel capacity: 590 US gal (490 imp gal; 2,200 L)
- Powerplant: 2 × Packard 2A-2540 12-cylinder V-cylinder piston engines, 787 hp (587 kW) each
- Propellers: metal propellers

Performance

== See also ==
Related development

- Fokker LB-2
