= Saints Peter and Paul Catholic Church (Sandusky, Ohio) =

Historic church in Ohio, United States

Sts. Peter & Paul Catholic Church
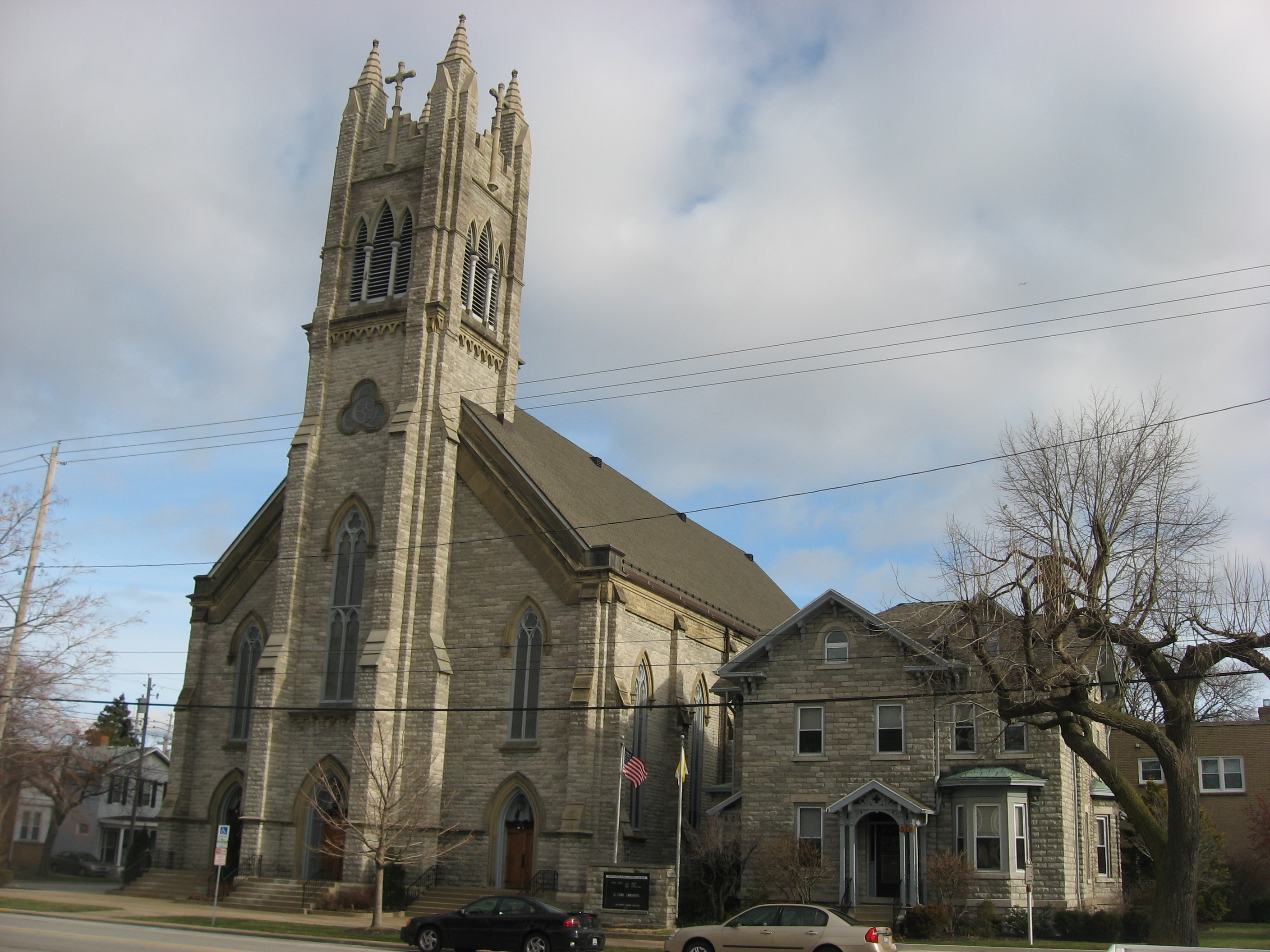
- Sts. Peter & Paul Catholic Church
- 41°27′8″N 82°42′32″W
- Location: Columbus Ave. at E. Jefferson St., Sandusky, Ohio

Clergy
- Pastor: Fr. Monte Hoyles
- Saints Peter and Paul Catholic Church
- U.S. National Register of Historic Places
- Location within Ohio Location within the United States
- Area: 0 acres (0 ha)
- Built: 1865
- Architect: Patrick Charles Keely
- Architectural style: Gothic, Italianate
- MPS: Sandusky MRA
- NRHP reference No.: 83001963
- Added to NRHP: January 20, 1983

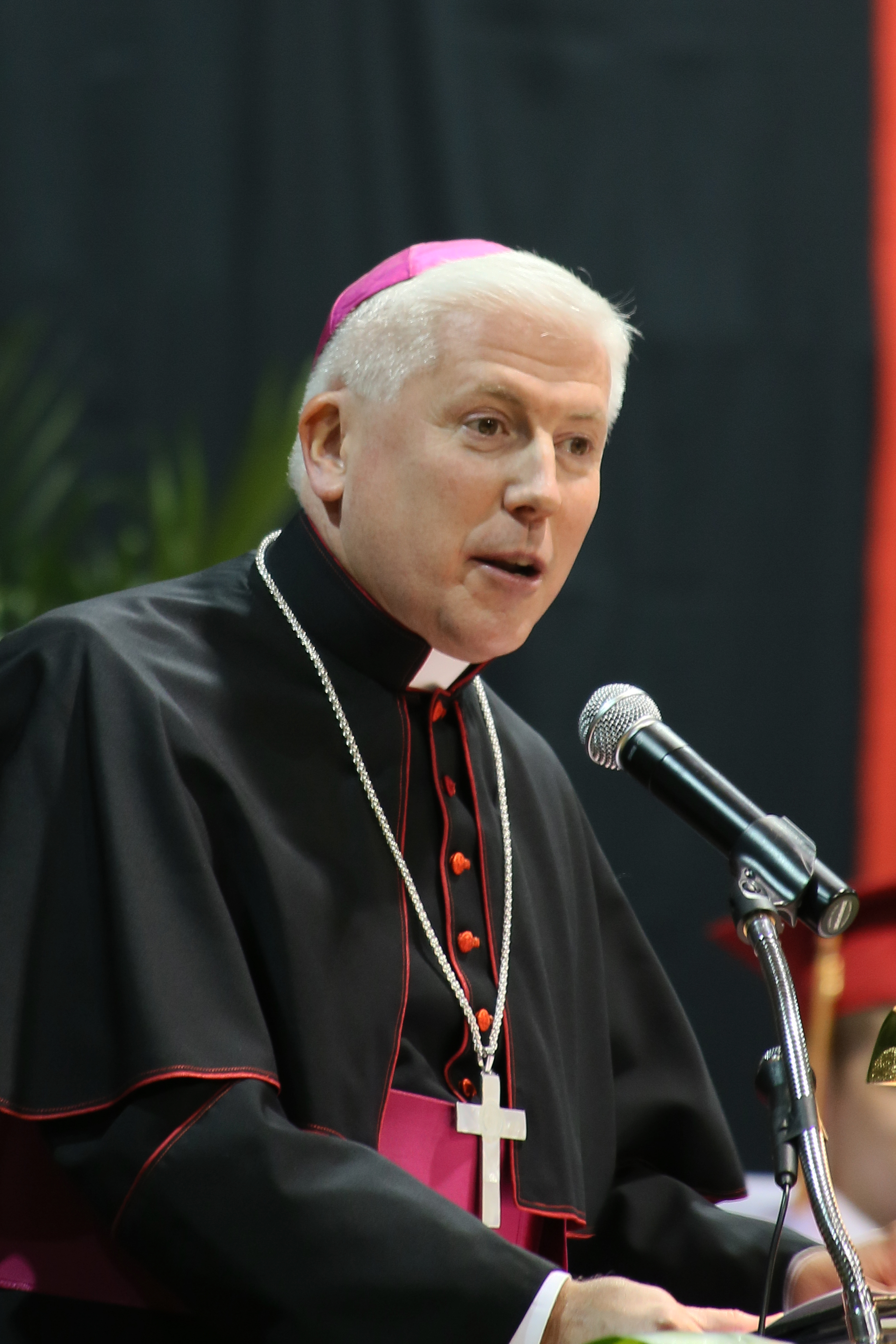
Bishop Daniel E. Thomas

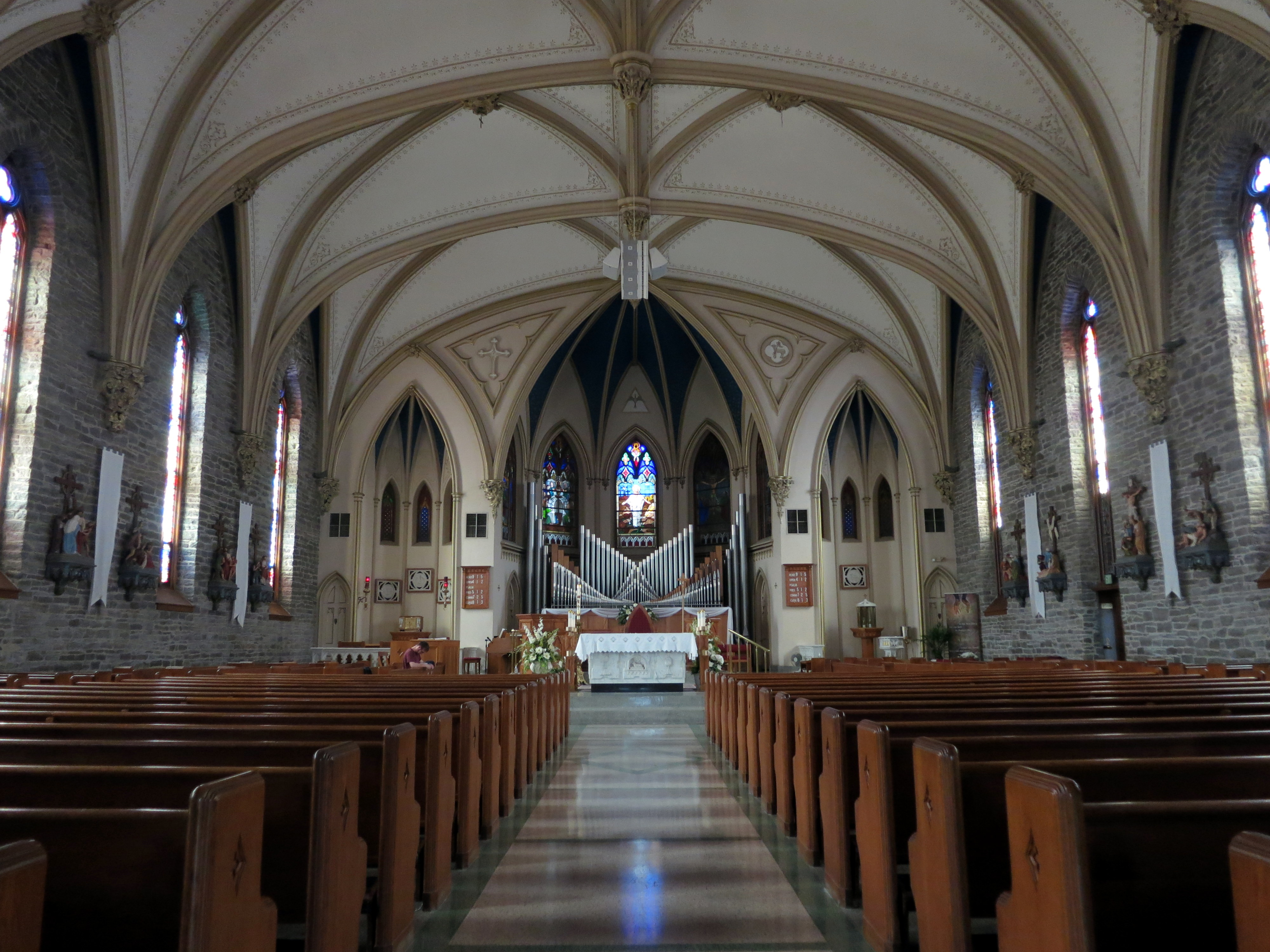
Interior of Sts. Peter & Paul Church

Saints Peter and Paul Catholic Church and Rectory is a historic church building on Columbus Avenue at East Jefferson Street in Sandusky, Ohio. It is home to a parish of the Roman Catholic Diocese of Toledo. It is also home to The Catholic Parishes of Sandusky’s Pastoral Office Building. The Catholic Parishes of Sandusky is a Tri-Parish made up of Holy Angels Church, St. Mary’s Church, and Sts. Peter & Paul Church, all of which are located in Sandusky, Ohio. The current Pastor of The Catholic Parishes of Sandusky is Fr. Monte Hoyles. The Associate Pastors are Fr. Chris Turner and Fr. Ajeesh Sam.

== History ==
It was built in 1866 and added to the National Register in 1983. The Church was built by local Italian-Americans who immigrated to this country in the mid to late 1800's. Many Italianate features that can be detected in this church, are the many statues, the Stations of the Cross which were built in Italy, the Altar which is made of marble from Italy, and the intricate stain glass windows on the sides of the church, as well as the five behind the altar depicting, from L-R, St. Peter, The Last Supper, The Risen Christ, The Crucifixion, and St. Paul. University of Notre Dame football coach, Knute Rockne, was married in this church in 1914.

== Patrons ==
Sts. Peter & Paul Catholic Church celebrates their parish feast day on June 29, the Solemnity of Sts. Peter and Paul. These two leading saints are considered the founders of the See of Rome, through their preaching, ministry, and martyrdom there. There are two stain glass windows behind the sanctuary in the center apse featuring St. Peter & St. Paul. Also, you may find two statues in the South apse near the Holy Face Of Jesus, of St. Peter & St. Paul.

== Organ ==
The Organ in the church is a 1981 Shantz Pipe Organ. It was installed in 1981. It has 1,591 pipes with 27 ranks. It has an electro-pneumatic chest with 4 divisions, 3 manuals, 21 stops, and 38 registers. It is in good condition and is used at all masses. This organ is state of the art. The organ is prominently featured in the center apse, behind the sanctuary.

== Diocese Of Toledo ==
Sts. Peter & Paul Roman Catholic Church is located in the Roman Catholic Diocese of Toledo. The Diocese is shepherded by The Most Holy Rev. Bishop Daniel E. Thomas. He has served as bishop since 2014. The Diocese of Toledo covers the Northwestern parts of the State of Ohio. Our Lady, Queen of the Most Holy Rosary Cathedral is the mother church of the diocese. The Diocese contains about 319,907 Catholics in an area population of 1,465,561.

== Sts. Peter & Paul Parish Festival ==
Sts. Peter & Paul formerly held a parish festival every year on the feast day of St. Peter & St. Paul. It was held in the Sts. Peter & Paul School parking lot. Spaghetti dinners were served inside the school in the cafeteria. Games, fellowship, food, and faith were all a part of the Sts. Peter & Paul Parish Festival. The festival was permanently cancelled in the late 2000's due to lack of involvement and interest.
