= Fokker S.III =

Dutch trainer aircraft

S.III
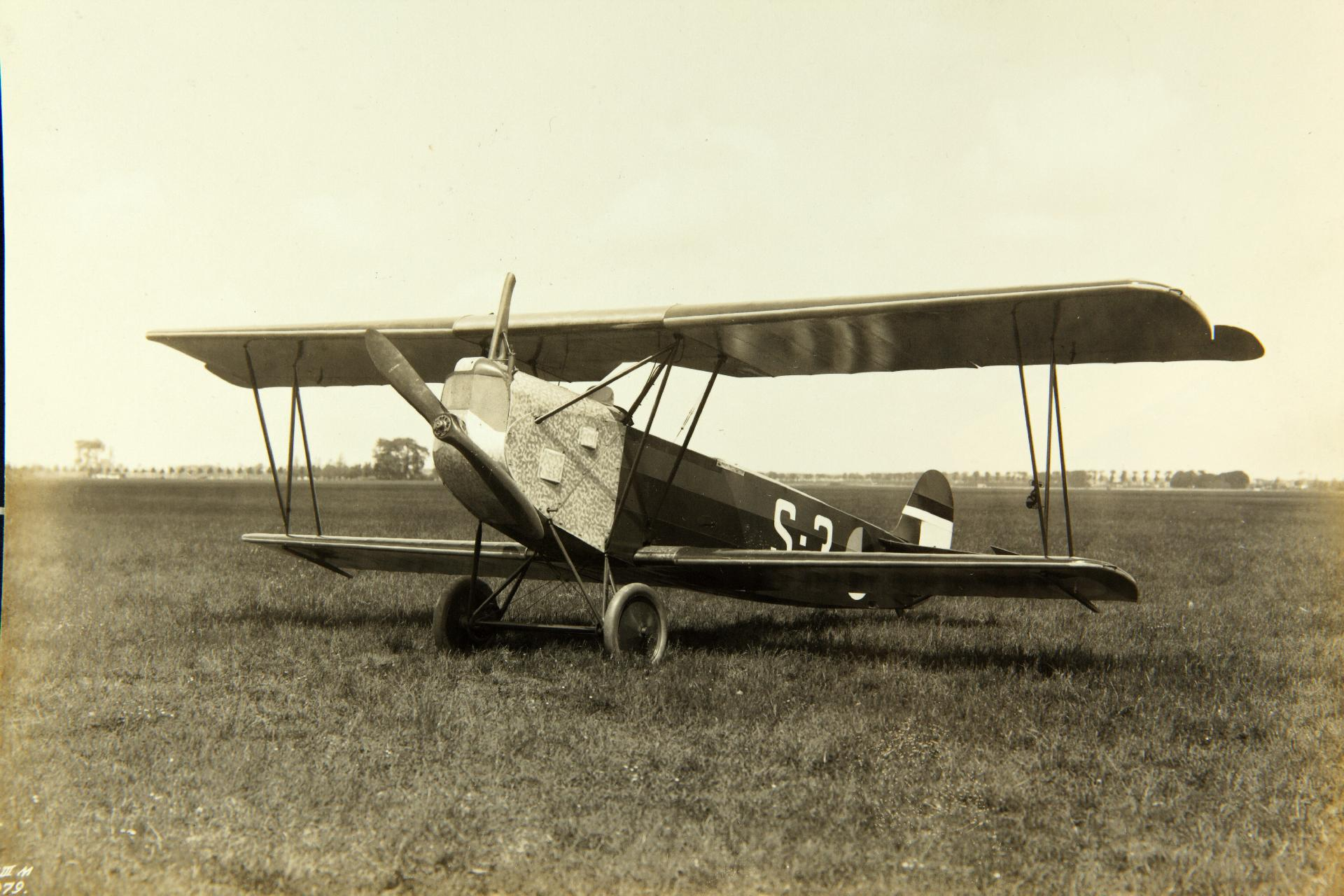

General information
- Type: Military trainer aircraft
- Manufacturer: Fokker

History
- Manufactured: 21

The Fokker S.III was a biplane trainer aircraft of the 1920s. It was of conventional configuration, seating the pilot and instructor in tandem, open cockpits. The single-baywings were staggered and of unequal span.

In 1927, Fokker's US subsidiary, Atlantic Aircraft imported a single example, in an attempt to interest the US Army in the type, but this did not result in a sale. The aircraft was eventually purchased by the Wright Aeronautical Corporation and used as an engine testbed until broken up in 1929.

== Variants ==
- S.III : Two-seat primary trainer biplane.
- S-3 : One aircraft imported into the United States by Atlantic Aircraft.

== Operators ==
Denmark

- Royal Danish Air Force - Two aircraft

Netherlands

- Royal Netherlands Navy

== Specifications (S.III) ==
General characteristics

- Crew: 2
- Length: 8.03 m (26 ft 4 in)
- Wingspan: 10.67 m (35 ft 0 in)
- Powerplant: 1 × Hispano-Suiza 8 V-8 water-cooled piston engine, 134 kW (180 hp)

Performance

- Maximum speed: 217 km/h (135 mph, 117 kn)
