= Fokker F-10 =

1920s American aircraft

F-10
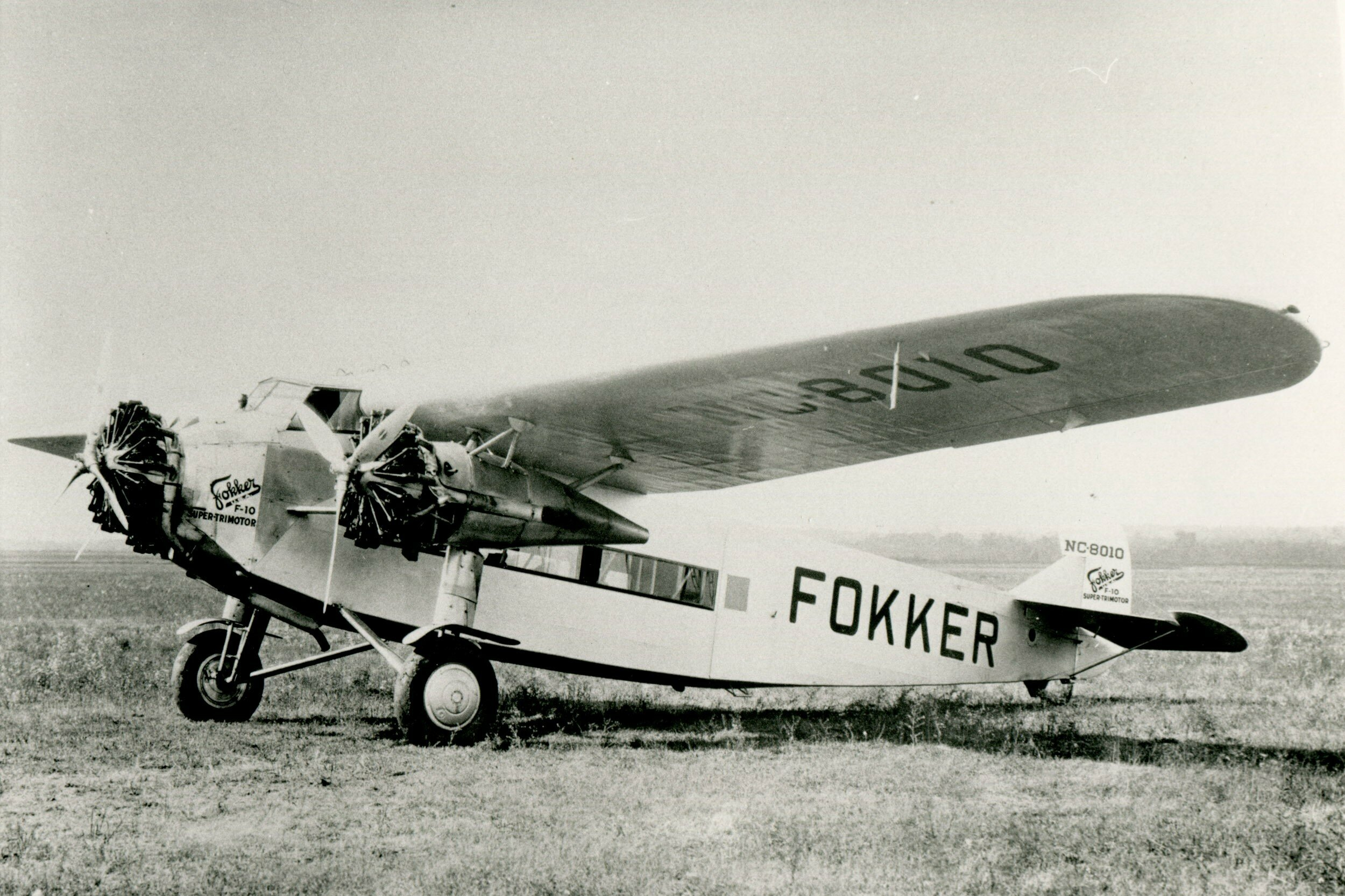
- Fokker F-10A Super Trimotor

General information
- Type: Passenger and military transport
- National origin: United States
- Manufacturer: Fokker Aircraft Corporation of America
- Number built: 65

History
- Introduction date: 1927
- Developed from: Fokker F.VII

The Fokker F-10 was an enlarged development of the Fokker F.VII airliner, built in the late 1920s by the Fokker Aircraft Corporation of America. It was a trimotor passenger aircraft, and it carried 12 passengers. This was four more than the F.VII it was based on, and it had a larger wing and more powerful engines than that design. A crash of this aircraft in 1931, led to widespread reforms in the U.S. aviation industry and hurt the reputation of wooden winged aircraft, especially the Fokker Tri-motor types.

== Operational history ==
Fokker built 65 for commercial and military service. After the crash of a Transcontinental & Western Air F-10 in 1931, killing Notre Dame football coach Knute Rockne and seven others, which was caused by the deterioration of the wooden wing spar, the type was temporarily grounded, and it was required to undergo more frequent and rigorous inspection. Its public image was also greatly damaged, leading to its early retirement from U.S. airlines.

== Variants ==
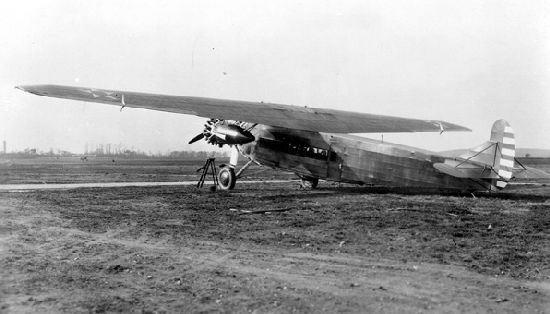
USAAC Fokker C-5

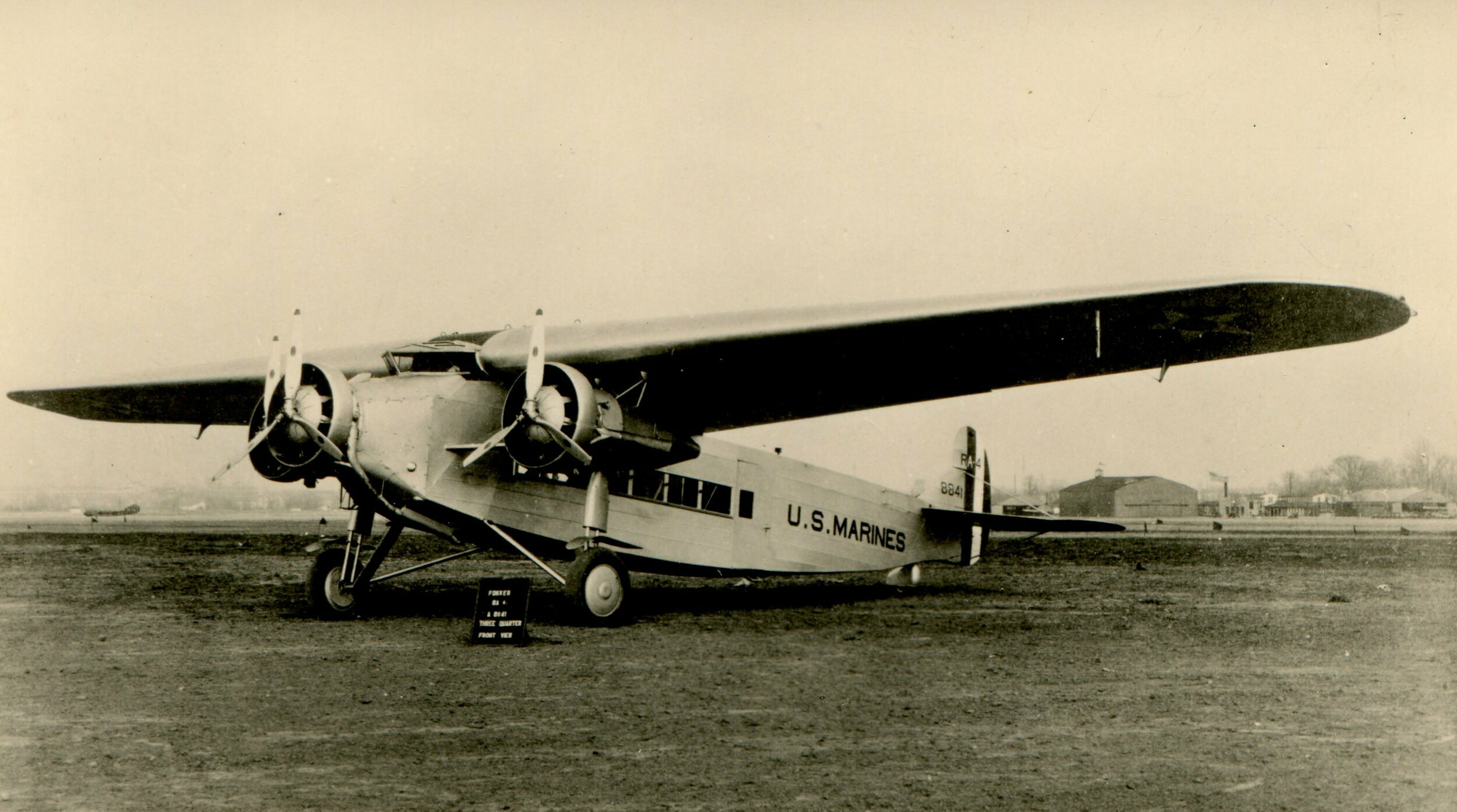
The RA-4 as evaluated by the US Marine Corps.

F-10
Initial production variant.
F-10A
Improved and revised 14-passenger variant powered by three 420 hp (310 kW) Pratt & Whitney Wasp radial engines, often called the Super Trimotor.
C-5
United States Army designation for the evaluation of one re-engined F-10A powered by three Wright R-975 radials.
LB-2
Light bomber version.
RA-4
United States Navy designation for the evaluation of one F-10A.

== Operators ==
=== Civil operators ===
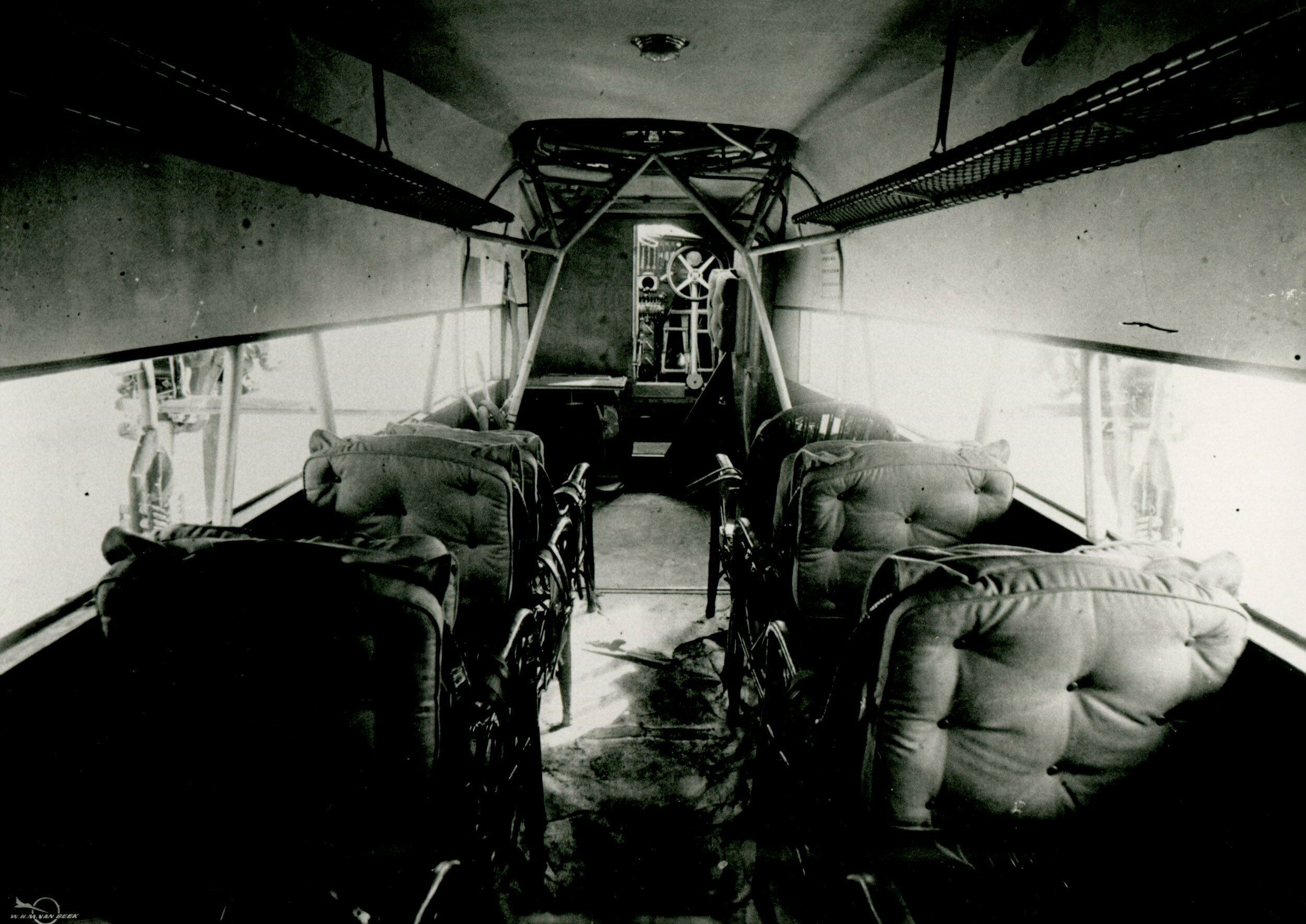
Passenger cabin on the Fokker F-10

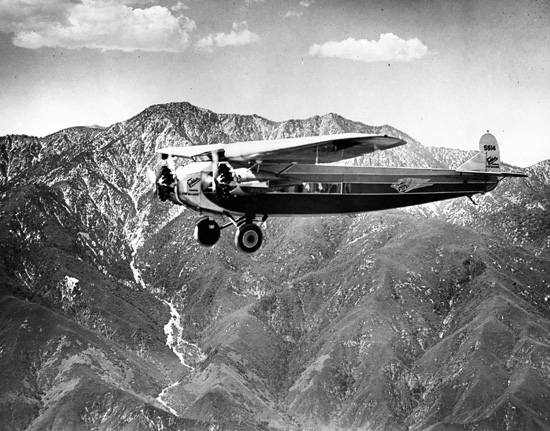
Richfield Oil Fokker F.10

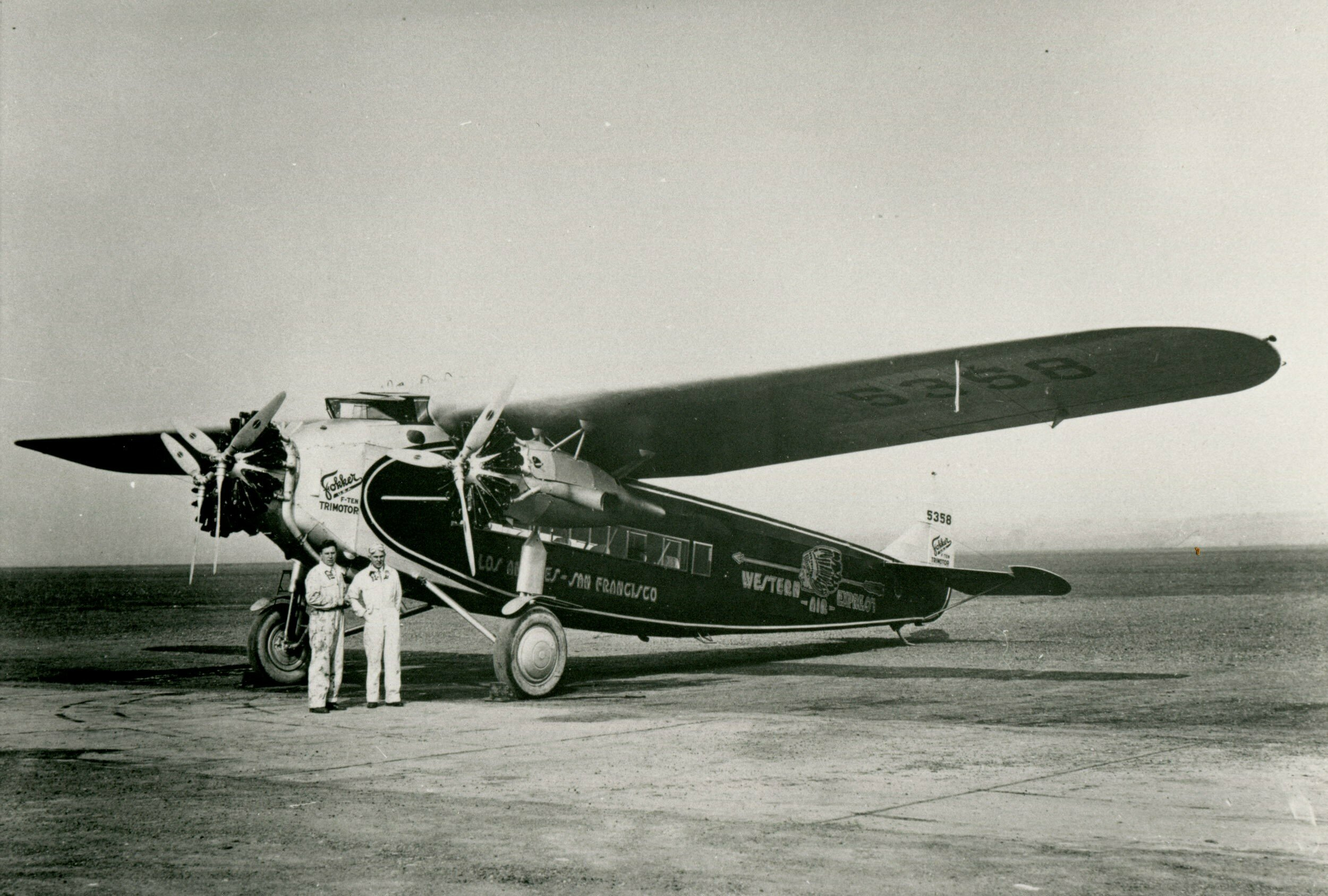
Western Air Express F-10

United States

- American Airways
- Boston-Maine Airways
- Pan Am
- TWA
- Universal Airlines
- Western Air Express (launch customer)

Mexico

- Aerovias Centrales
- Mexicana

=== Military operators ===
United States

- United States Army Air Corps designations C-5 and C-7A.

== Accidents and incidents ==
- On June 10, 1929, a Pan Am F-10, registration NC9700 and named Cuba, struck telephone wires and crashed while taking off from Santiago de Cuba bound for Havana, killing two of five on board. The aircraft failed to gain altitude due to a waterlogged runway.
- On March 31, 1931, a Transcontinental & Western Air F-10 crashed near Bazaar, Kansas after a wing separated in flight, killing all eight on board, including football coach Knute Rockne.
- On March 19, 1932, an American Airways F-10A, registration NC652E, struck power lines in heavy fog and crashed into an orchard near Calimesa, California, killing all seven on board.
- On September 8, 1932, an American Airways F-10, registration NC9716, crashed into a mountain in poor weather near Salt Flat, Texas, killing three of four on board.

== Specifications (F-10) ==
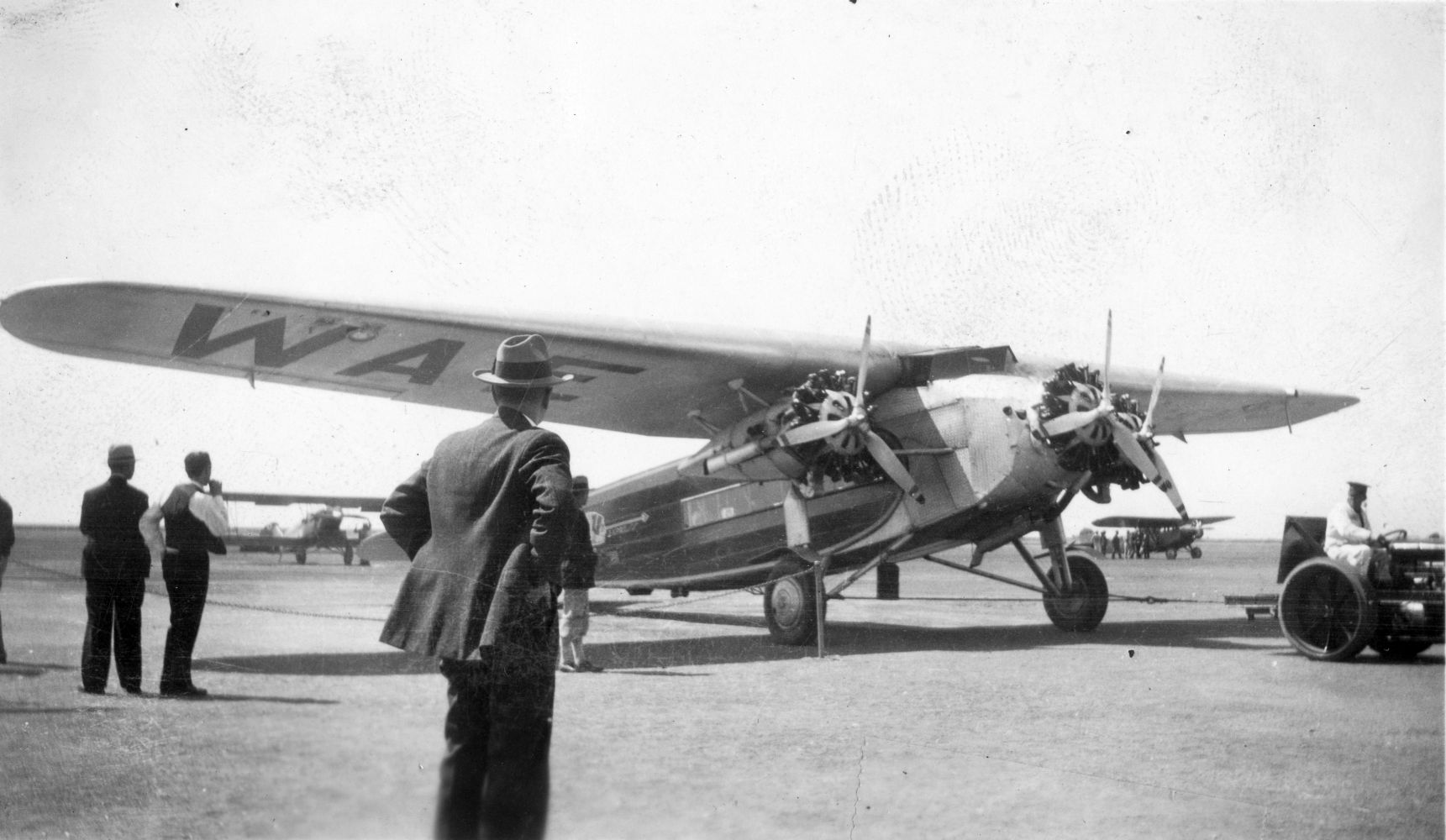
Western Air Express Fokker F-10, Oakland, May 1932

Data from Jane's all the World's Aircraft 1928, Aero Favourites:Fokker F.10.

General characteristics

- Crew: 1 pilot
- Capacity: 12 passengers
- Length: 50 ft 8 in (15.44 m)
- Wingspan: 71 ft 2 in (21.69 m)
- Height: 12 ft 5 in (3.78 m)
- Wing area: 728 sq ft (67.6 m^{2})
- Empty weight: 6,550 lb (2,971 kg)
- Gross weight: 11,500 lb (5,216 kg)
- Powerplant: 3 × Pratt & Whitney R-1340 Wasp 9-cylinder air-cooled radial piston engines, 425 hp (317 kW) each
- Propellers: 3-bladed metal propellers

Performance

- Maximum speed: 140 mph (230 km/h, 120 kn)
- Cruise speed: 120 mph (190 km/h, 100 kn)
- Landing speed: 55 mph (48 kn; 89 km/h)
- Range: 795 mi (1,279 km, 691 nmi)
- Service ceiling: 18,000 ft (5,500 m)
- Rate of climb: 1,420 ft/min (7.2 m/s)
- Time to altitude: 10,000 ft (3,000 m) in 10 minutes
- Wing loading: 15.8 lb/sq ft (77 kg/m^{2})
- Power/mass: 9.05 lb/hp (5.50 kg/kW)

== See also ==
Related development

- Fokker F.VII
- Avro 618 Ten

Aircraft of comparable role, configuration, and era

- Ford Trimotor
