= 1931 Transcontinental & Western Air Fokker F-10 crash =

1931 aircraft crash in Kansas, US

Transcontinental & Western Air Flight 599
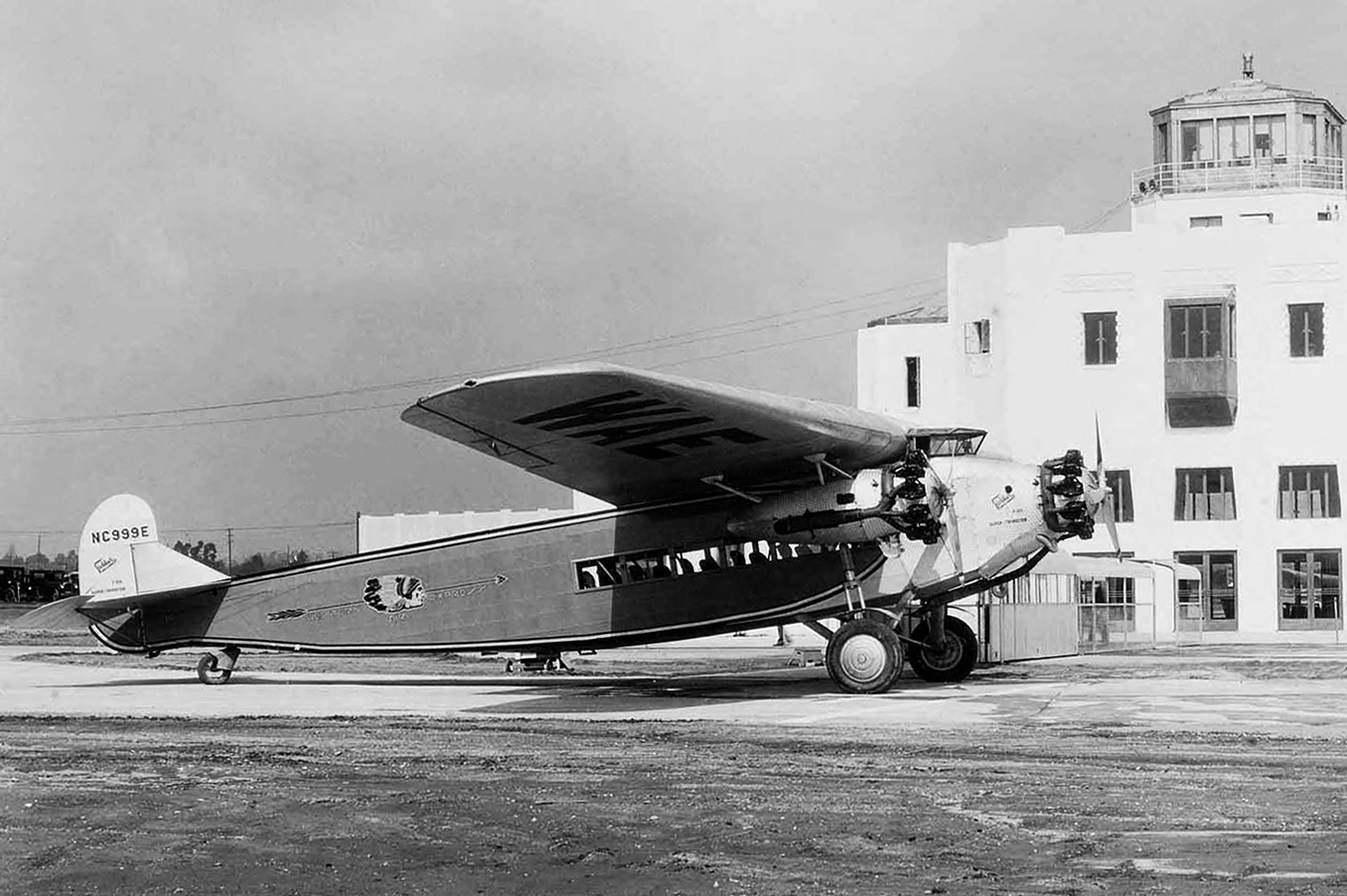
- NC999E, the aircraft involved in the accident, in front of the control tower of Alhambra Airport in March 1930. Underwing letters WAE are those of TWA predecessor Western Air Express.

Accident
- Date: March 31, 1931
- Summary: Structural failure
- Site: Bazaar Township, Chase County, Kansas, U.S.; 38°14′09″N 96°35′12″W

Aircraft
- Aircraft type: Fokker F-10
- Operator: Transcontinental and Western Air
- Registration: NC999E
- Flight origin: Kansas City, Missouri
- Stopover: Wichita, Kansas
- Destination: Los Angeles, California
- Passengers: 6
- Crew: 2
- Fatalities: 8
- Survivors: 0

On March 31, 1931, a Fokker F-10 belonging to Transcontinental and Western Air crashed near Bazaar, Kansas, after taking off from Kansas City Municipal Airport in Kansas City, Missouri.

The scheduled flight was from Kansas City to Los Angeles, with a stopover in Wichita. (Note: Although many recent sources refer to this as "Flight 599" (for example, page 35 of College Football's Great Dynasties: Notre Dame by Roland Lazenby, published in 1991), this seems to be a corruption; older sources, along with other recent sources, refer to it as "Flight 5" (an older example is page 127 of The Only Way to Fly: the Story of Western Airlines, America's Senior Air Carrier by Robert J. Serling, published in 1976). Transcontinental & Western Air's own timetables from this period have no "Flight 599" or any flight numbers with more than two digits, and its transcontinental flights all have one-digit numbers, as can be seen in Airline Timetable Images' scans of T&WA's February 1, 1931 and April 20, 1931 timetables. The latter timetable includes a "Flight No. 5" with the same route and schedule as the flight which crashed.) On this first leg, the wooden structure of one wing failed, causing the aircraft to crash, killing all eight people on board, including Notre Dame football coach Knute Rockne.

The investigation found that the wooden wing became moist over time, causing the glue connecting the wing to the fuselage to weaken, allowing the wing to separate. The crash brought about significant changes in airplane safety and the airplane industry. The death of Rockne and the crash's effect on the public perception of the safety of aircraft contributed to its cultural significance.

== The crash ==
The Transcontinental and Western Air flight was a Fokker F.10 Trimotor en route from Kansas City to Los Angeles on March 31, 1931. On the first leg of the flight to Wichita, the airplane crashed into an open field (Note: crash site satellite-sightseer.com) a few miles southwest of Bazaar; all eight on board died, including famed football coach Knute Rockne, of the University of Notre Dame.

Numerous factors complicated the subsequent investigation, resulting in difficulty establishing, with certainty, the cause of the crash. The investigation was initially undermined by a severe shortage of evidence: When government investigators first arrived at the crash site, they found that most of the wreckage had been taken by souvenir hunters and scavengers, leaving only engines, wings and propeller.

Among the issues speculated is that the craft may have been dealing with turbulence, or icing on the aircraft, or both—which could have resulted in flying conditions that may have led to control difficulty, and an overstressing of the wing. (As evidence, some cite the co-pilot's radio call to Wichita, an hour into the flight, saying, "The weather here is getting tough. We're going to turn around and go back to Kansas City.") Later theories conclude that the pilots thought their difficulty controlling the plane was due to clear-air turbulence, and the transmission was sent before they were aware of the wing's deficiency, if indeed they ever knew before the wing failed.

It is often claimed that the flight went down in or shortly after a thunderstorm, but meteorological records show that there was no significant convective activity at the time.

The late morning accident was arguably caused by the composition of the aircraft. The wings of Fokker Trimotors were made of wood laminate; in this instance, moisture had entered the interior of one wing over a period and had weakened the glue bonding the structure. One spar finally failed; the wing developed uncontrolled flutter and separated from the aircraft. In any case, the structural condition of the wooden wing is widely agreed to have been at least a significant contributory factor.

== Public impact and aviation legacy ==
Although the accident is best known for causing the death of Rockne, it also led to major changes in American aviation that radically transformed airline safety worldwide. Other comparable crashes had occurred before, but this one, which killed a popular national hero, brought a national outcry for getting "answers to the mystery" as the public demanded solutions that might prevent such disasters in the future.

=== Rockne mourned and questions raised ===
Knute Rockne, the head football coach at the University of Notre Dame, was one of the passengers aboard the aircraft. At the time, Rockne held the highest winning percentage in college football history and had established a prominent national profile. Despite being a Norwegian immigrant, he widely became recognised as a public figure and cultural icon in the United States during the onset of the Great Depression.

Rockne, 43, was on his way to Los Angeles to participate in the production of the Hollywood motion picture The Spirit of Notre Dame (released October 13, 1931). A father of four, Rockne had stopped over in Kansas City to visit his two eldest children, sons Bill and Knute, Jr., in boarding school there at Pembroke Hill.

The sudden, dramatic death of Rockne startled the nation, and triggered a national outpouring of grief, comparable to the deaths of presidents. President Herbert Hoover called Rockne's death "a national loss." King Haakon VII of Norway (Rockne's birthplace) posthumously knighted him and sent a personal envoy to the massive funeral, held at the Basilica of the Sacred Heart on the Notre Dame campus. Thousands from around the world gathered at the funeral, which was broadcast around the globe.

Driven by the public feeling for Rockne, the crash story played out at length in nearly all of the nation's newspapers and gradually evolved into national demand for a public inquiry into the causes and circumstances of the crash.

=== Airline regulation and operations ===
At first, the crash brought changes to the operations of both TWA and the Aeronautics Branch of the US Department of Commerce, forerunner of the American Federal Aviation Administration (FAA).

All Fokker Trimotors in U.S. airline service were temporarily grounded, and they were henceforth required to undergo more frequent and rigorous inspections and maintenance. The expense of this, compounded with the bad publicity associated with Rockne's death, almost sank TWA, while aircraft manufacturer Fokker suffered a serious blow to its reputation and sales.

The intense public interest in the cause of the accident forced the Department of Commerce to abandon its policy of keeping the results of aircraft crash investigations secret.

Many references claim that the accident was also the impetus for the formation of the Civil Aeronautics Board (CAB), an independent investigative organization and the predecessor of the National Transportation Safety Board, but the CAB was not formed until 1940, five years after an accident involving US Senator Bronson M. Cutting underlined the department's conflicts of interest with respect to their associations with airlines and their provision and maintenance of navigational aids.

Nevertheless, the Rockne crash created a public expectation for the U.S. government to provide objective reviews of crashes and public release of the findings, beginning the tradition of public air crash investigation reports, which began to pinpoint and publicize blame for accidents, forcing safety improvements by both government and industry.

=== Aircraft design and technology ===
The disaster discredited wood-framed aircraft, and it effectively forced airlines to adopt all-metal aircraft. The result was a leap forward in aircraft design quality and safety, as manufacturers developed advanced all-metal designs under pressure from the airlines. Various aircraft safety innovations were proposed and promoted, largely in response to the crash. Overall, the success and/or development of three key aircraft in aviation history were driven largely by the Rockne crash:

- Ford Trimotor

Airlines first turned to the all-metal Ford Trimotor, a slow, boxy three-engined aircraft similar to the Fokker but all-metal and already available and in use at the time. Though slower than the Fokker and far more costly to build, the Ford offered sturdy all-metal construction and (in some cases) greater capacity.

- Boeing 247

Boeing developed the first truly modern airliner, the Boeing 247, which ushered in key design features now common in most airliners:

- hollow-shell ("monocoque") all-metal design (aluminum), for light and streamlined aircraft structure,
- retractable landing gear (significant streamlining, and greater speed/efficiency),
- NACA engine cowling (significant streamlining, and greater speed/efficiency),
- supercharged engines, forcing pressurized air into the engines thereby increasing power, and enabling operation in thinner air at higher altitudes, above some weather,
- sufficient reserve engine power to allow safe takeoff with a full load on only one engine (of multiple engines), in the event of an engine failure at takeoff (time of highest likelihood for engine failure),
- controllable-pitch propellers (like a continuously-variable transmission on an automobile, allowing a wider range of flying speeds, more thrust for takeoff, and more efficient propulsion, improving performance), on later models, starting with 247D, and
- de-icing equipment.

- Douglas DC-2/Douglas DC-3:

The Boeing 247 would soon be utterly eclipsed by another plane designed in response to the Rockne crash, the Douglas DC-2/Douglas DC-3. The most important commercial aircraft of all time, the Douglas DC-3 was developed initially as the Douglas DC-1/Douglas DC-2 to fill TWA's demand for an all-metal replacement for their suddenly-obsolete trimotor aircraft.

United Airlines (under United Aircraft, which was also the parent company of Boeing, at the time) had monopolized all Boeing 247 production, forcing TWA to look elsewhere to modernize their fleet from the wooden Fokkers and clunky Fords; the Douglas DC-2 was the result. The DC-2 took all the advances of the Boeing 247 a step further with greater speed, range, and payload which evolved with the rounding of its fuselage into the wider 21-seat DC-3, which became the first airliner to truly make airlines profitable. The DC-3 revolutionized the affordability, availability and safety of air travel — triggering an "explosion" in airline travel to seven times the volume within a few years of the Rockne crash. Most of the world's air travel was in DC-3s by the start of World War II (in which the DC-3 became the most successful military transport). The DC-3 launched regional airlines in the postwar years, and it remained a powerful force in spreading aviation's benefit for the rest of the century, with some still flying today.

== Memorials and commemorations ==
The Knute Rockne Memorial (Note: memorial) at the crash site near Bazaar, Kansas, memorializes Rockne and the 7 others who died with him. The tall, engraved-granite marker, a memorial dedicated to the victims and topped with the name "Rockne", stands surrounded by a wire fence with wooden posts; it was maintained for many years by James Easter Heathman, who died in 2008, who, at age 13 in 1931, was one of the first people to arrive at the site of the crash.

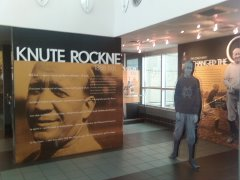
Former Knute Rockne memorial at Matfield Green on the Kansas Turnpike

Now part of the Heathman family estate, the memorial and crash site are on private property, off-road, and accessible only by arrangement (Note: arrangement) with the landowners, or during memorial commemorations. A memorial ceremony is held at the crash site memorial (and at a nearby schoolhouse) every five years since the crash, drawing relatives of the victims, and Rockne / Notre Dame fans, from around the world. In 2011, on the 80th anniversary of the crash, over 150 people gathered, including former Football Hall of Fame director Bernie Kish. Speeches were made, a bagpipe played, and a small plane flew over the crowd at the crash site, on the exact minute of the crash.

The Matfield Green rest stop and travel plaza on the Kansas Turnpike near Bazaar and the crash site used to have a large, glassed-in exhibit on the west side of its center foyer commemorating Rockne (chiefly), as well as the other crash victims, and the crash.

The passengers and crew of the flight were Knute Rockne, H. J. Christen (Chicago), John Happer (Chicago), Waldo B. Miller (Hartford, Conn.), Spencer Goldthwaite (New York), G. A. Robrecht (Chicago), Pilot Robert Fry, and Co-Pilot Herman J. "Jess" Mathias.

== See also ==
- Aviation safety
- List of accidents and incidents involving commercial aircraft
