= Knute Rockne =

Norwegian-American football player and coach (1888–1931)

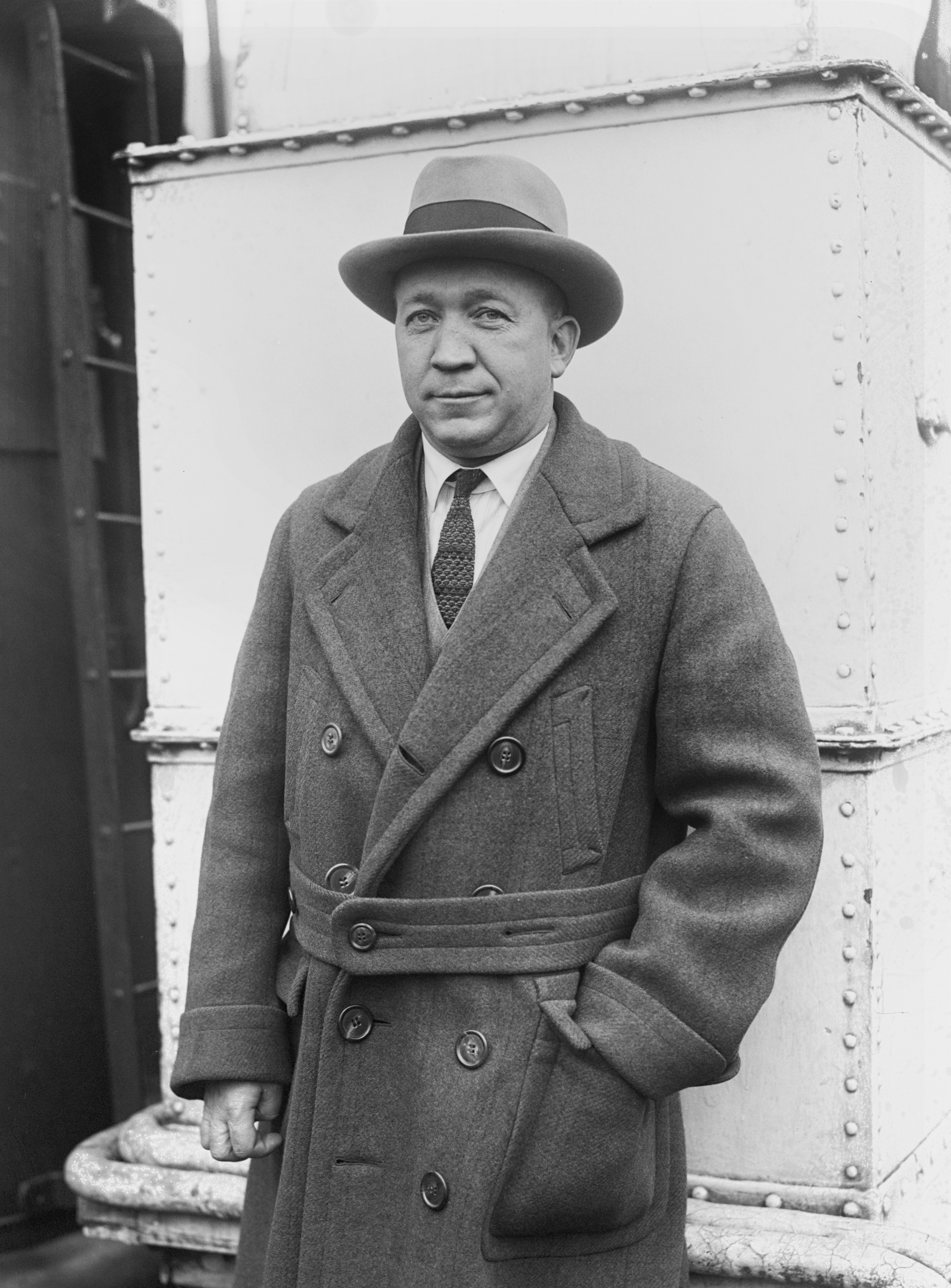

Biographical details
- Born: March 4, 1888; Voss Municipality, Norway
- Died: March 31, 1931 (aged 43); Bazaar Township, Kansas, U.S.
- Education: University of Notre Dame

Playing career
- 1910–1913: Notre Dame
- 1914: Akron Indians
- 1915: Fort Wayne Friars
- 1915–1917: Massillon Tigers
- Position: End

Coaching career (HC unless noted)
- 1914–1917: Notre Dame (assistant)
- 1916–1917: South Bend Jolly Fellows Club
- 1918–1930: Notre Dame

Administrative career (AD unless noted)
- 1918–1931: Notre Dame

Head coaching record
- Overall: 105–12–5
- Bowls: 1–0

Accomplishments and honors

Championships
- 3 national (1924, 1929, 1930)

Awards
- Second-team All-American (1913): 2× First-team All-Western (1911, 1913)
- College Football Hall of Fame; Inducted in 1951 (profile)

Knute Kenneth Rockne (/(kə)ˈnuːt ˈrɒkni/; March 4, 1888 – March 31, 1931) was a Norwegian–American football player and coach at the University of Notre Dame. Leading Notre Dame for 13 seasons, Rockne accumulated over 100 wins and three national championships.

Rockne is regarded as one of the greatest coaches in college football history. His biography at the College Football Hall of Fame, where he was inducted in 1951, identifies him as "without question, American football's most-renowned coach". Rockne helped to popularize the forward pass and made the Notre Dame Fighting Irish a major factor in college football.

In 1931, at the age of 43, Rockne died in a plane crash.

== Early life ==
Knut Larsen Rokne was born in Voss, Norway, to smith and wagonmaker Lars Knutson Rokne (1858–1912) and his wife, Martha Pedersdatter Gjermo (1859–1944). He immigrated to the US with his parents when he was five years old. He grew up in the Logan Square area of Chicago, on the northwest side of the city. Rockne learned to play football in his neighborhood and later played end for the local Logan Square Tigers. He attended Lorenz Brentano elementary school and North West Division High School in Chicago where he played football and ran track.

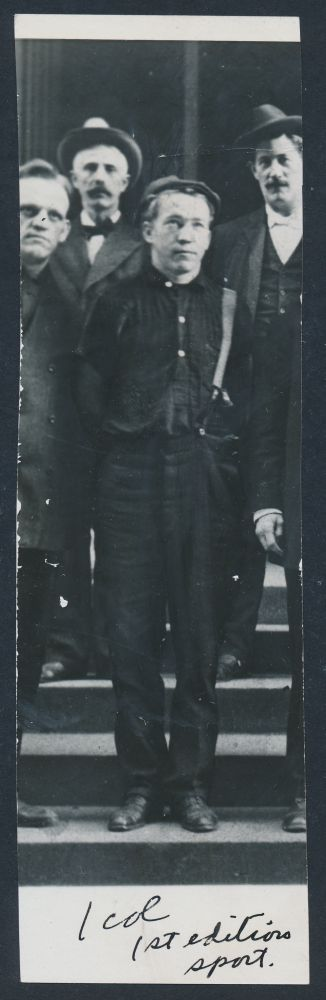
Rockne as a Chicago postal worker, 1906

After Rockne graduated from high school, he took a job as a mail dispatcher with the post office in Chicago for four years. His clerk's salary was $600 in 1907 and $900 in 1909. When he was 22, he had saved enough money to continue his education. He was admitted to the University of Notre Dame in Indiana to finish his schooling. Rockne excelled as a football end there, winning second team All-American honors in 1913. In track and field, he competed in the pole vault, long jump, shot put, and 880 yard run.["Biography for Knute Rockne". American Voices.]. Rockne also worked as a lifeguard at the Cedar Point park in Sandusky, Ohio in the summer of 1913.

Rockne helped to transform the college game in a single contest. On November 1, 1913, the Notre Dame squad stunned the highly regarded Army team 35–13 in a game played at West Point. Led by quarterback Charlie "Gus" Dorais and Rockne, the Notre Dame team attacked the Cadets with an offense that featured both the expected powerful running game but also long and accurate downfield forward passes from Dorais to Rockne. This game was not the "invention" of the forward pass, but it was the first major contest in which a team used the forward pass regularly throughout the game.

== Early career ==
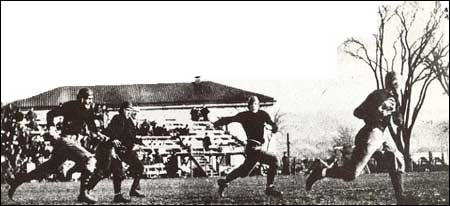
Rockne scoring against Army, 1913

=== At Notre Dame ===
At Notre Dame, Rockne studied chemistry and graduated in 1914 with a degree in pharmacy. He worked as a laboratory assistant to noted polymer chemist Julius Arthur Nieuwland at Notre Dame and helped with the football team, but he rejected further work in chemistry after receiving an offer to coach football.

=== As pro football player ===
In 1914, Rockne was recruited by quarterback George "Peggy" Parratt to play for the Akron Indians. Rockne played both end and halfback and teamed with Parratt on several successful forward pass plays during their title drive. Rockne moved to Massillon, Ohio, in 1915 along with former Notre Dame teammate Dorais to play with the professional Massillon Tigers. Rockne and Dorais brought the forward pass to professional football from 1915 to 1917 when they led the Tigers to the championship in 1915. Pro Football in the Days of Rockne by Emil Klosinski maintains the worst loss ever suffered by Rockne was in 1917. He coached the South Bend Jolly Fellows Club when they lost 40–0 to the Toledo Maroons.

== Notre Dame coach ==
While many trace Knute Rockne's debut as a Notre Dame football coach to the war-torn 1918 season, or in 1914 when he became an assistant coach under Jesse Harper, his first position was actually for the Corby and Sorin Hall football teams as a student-athlete in 1912 and 1913. These teams represented residence halls on the university grounds that competed against one another in various sports, the most popular of which was football. The term for these competitions is colloquially known as interhall sports. Ironically, while Rockne holds the highest winning-percentage of any major college football coach, his overall record in the interhall football league was a paltry 2–5–4 across two seasons.

The Notre Dame Box

During 13 years as head coach, Rockne led Notre Dame to 105 victories, 12 losses, 5 ties, and 3 consensus national championships, which included 5 undefeated and untied seasons. Rockne posted the highest all-time winning percentage (.881) for a major college football coach. His schemes utilized the eponymous Notre Dame Box offense and the 7–2–2 defense. Rockne's box included a shift. The backfield lined up in a T-formation, then quickly shifted into a box to the left or right just as the ball was snapped.

Rockne also recognized that intercollegiate sports had a show-business aspect. Thus he worked hard promoting Notre Dame football to make it financially successful. He used his charm to court favor from the media, which then consisted of newspapers, wire services and radio stations and networks, to obtain free advertising for Notre Dame football. He was successful as a promoter for South Bend-based Studebaker and other products. Through sustained effort, work with Studebaker, several side jobs, and coaching at the University of Notre Dame, Rockne eventually earned an income of $75,000 from all his financial activities combined.

=== 1918–1930 ===
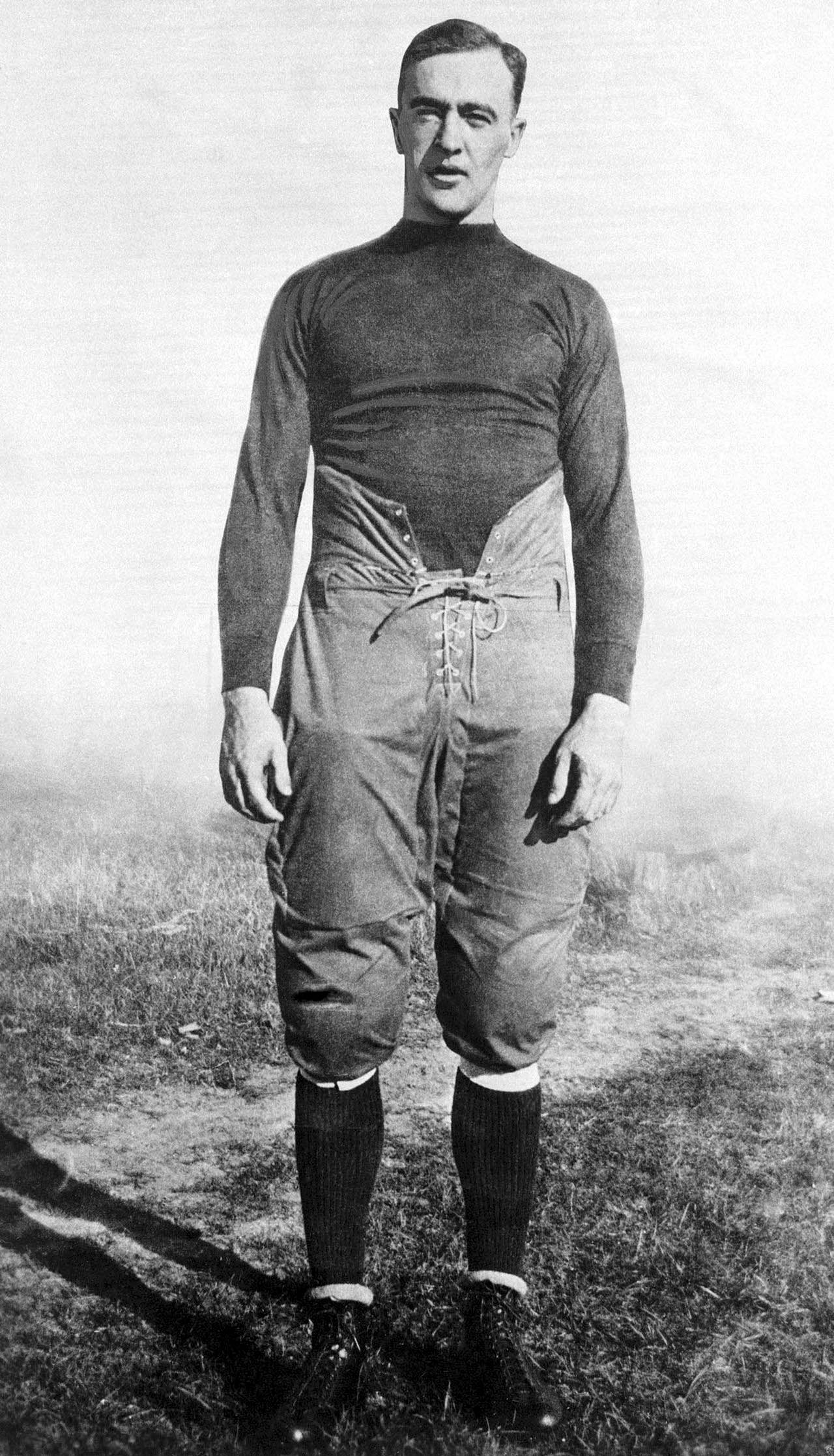
George Gipp

During the war-torn season of 1918, Rockne took over from his predecessor Jesse Harper and posted a 3–1–2 record, losing only to the MAC Aggies (now the MSU Spartans). He made his coaching debut on September 28, 1918, against Case Tech in Cleveland, earning a 26–6 victory. In the backfield were Leonard Bahan, George Gipp, and Curly Lambeau. In Gipp, Rockne had an ideal handler of the forward pass.

Rockne handled the line and Gus Dorais handled the backfield of the 1919 team. The team went undefeated and was a national champion, though the championship is not recognized by Notre Dame.

Gipp died on December 14, 1920, just two weeks after being elected Notre Dame's first All-American by Walter Camp. He likely contracted strep throat and pneumonia while giving punting lessons after his final game, on November 20 against Northwestern University. Since antibiotics were not available in the 1920s, treatment options for such infections were limited and they could be fatal even to the young and healthy. It was while on his hospital bed and speaking to Rockne that he is purported to have delivered the line "win just one for the Gipper".

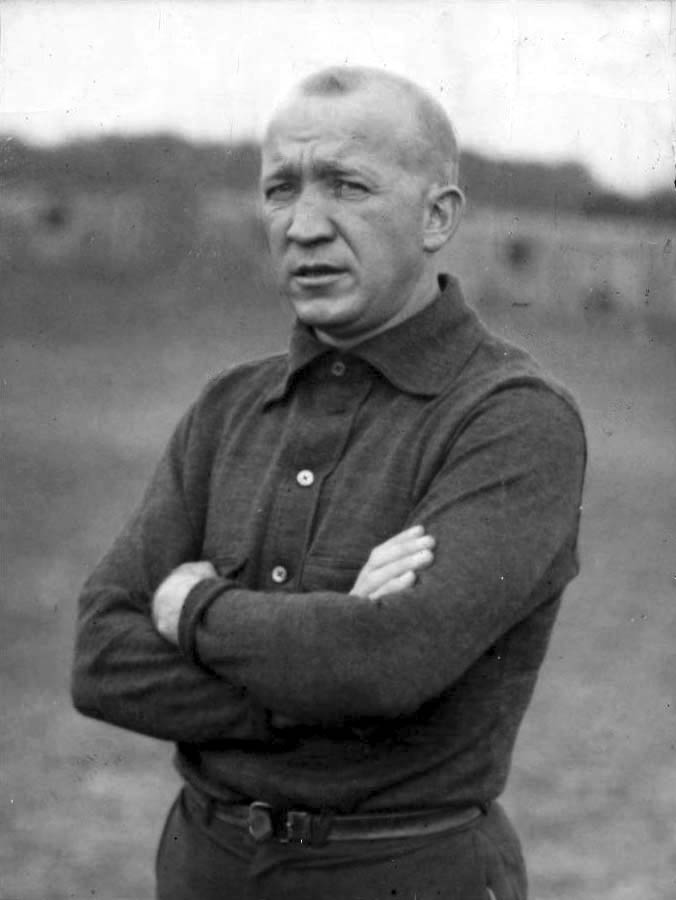
Rockne in 1921

John Mohardt led the 1921 Notre Dame team to a 10–1 record with 781 rushing yards, 995 passing yards, 12 rushing touchdowns, and 9 passing touchdowns. Grantland Rice wrote, "Mohardt could throw the ball to within a foot or two of any given space" and noted that the 1921 Notre Dame team "was the first team we know of to build its attack around a forward passing game, rather than use a forward passing game as a mere aid to the running game". Mohardt had both Eddie Anderson and Roger Kiley at end to receive his passes.

The national champion 1924 team included the "Four Horsemen" backfield of Harry Stuhldreher, Don Miller, Jim Crowley, and Elmer Layden. The line was known as the "Seven Mules". The Irish capped an undefeated 10–0 season with a victory over Stanford in the Rose Bowl.

For all his success, Rockne also made what an Associated Press writer called "one of the greatest coaching blunders in history". Instead of coaching his 1926 team against Carnegie Tech, Rockne traveled to Chicago for the Army–Navy Game to "write newspaper articles about it, as well as select an All-America football team". Carnegie Tech used the coach's absence as motivation for a 19–0 win; the upset likely cost the Irish a chance for a national title.

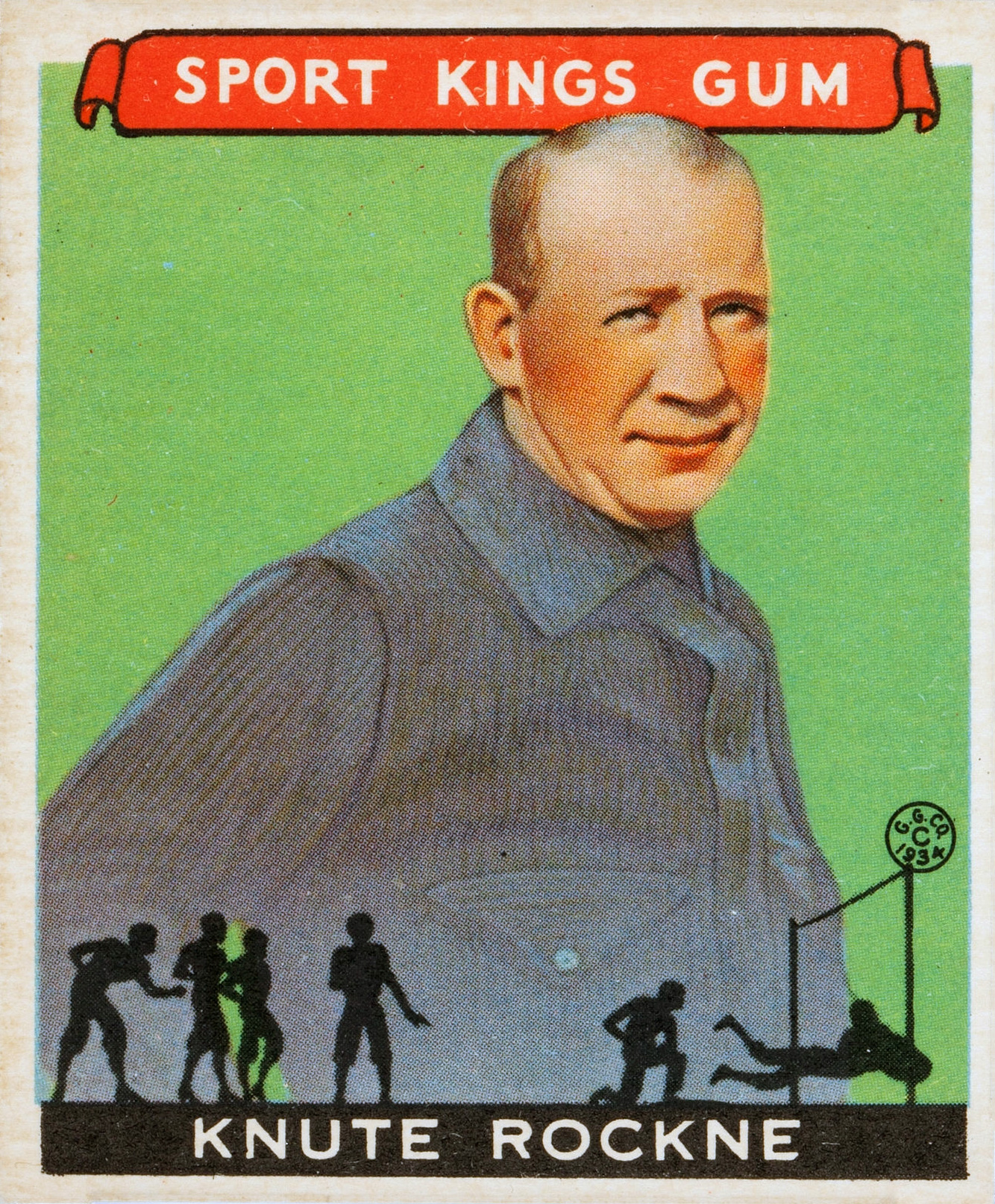
Goudy trading card of Rockne, issued 1933

The 1928 team lost to national champion Georgia Tech. "I sat at Grant Field and saw a magnificent Notre Dame team suddenly recoil before the furious pounding of one man–Peter Pund", said Rockne. "Nobody could stop him. I counted 20 scoring plays that this man ruined." Rockne wrote of an attack on his coaching in the Atlanta Journal, "I am surprised that a paper of such fine, high standing [as yours] would allow a zipper to write in his particular vein ... the article by Fuzzy Woodruff was not called for."

On November 10, 1928, the Fighting Irish were tied with Army 0–0 at the end of the half. Rockne entered the locker room and told the team the words he heard at Gipp's deathbed in 1920: "I've got to go, Rock. It's all right. I'm not afraid. Some time, Rock, when the team is up against it, when things are going wrong and the breaks are beating the boys, tell them to go in there with all they've got and win just one for the Gipper. I don't know where I'll be then, Rock. But I'll know about it, and I'll be happy." This inspired the team, who then won the game 12–6. The phrase "Win one for the Gipper" was later used as a political slogan by Ronald Reagan, who in 1940 portrayed Gipp in Knute Rockne, All American.

Both the 1929 and the 1930 teams went undefeated and were national champions. According to interviews, Rockne considered his 1929 team his strongest overall. Rockne also said he considered his 1930 team to have been his best offensively before the departure of Jumping Joe Savoldi. Rockne was struck with illness in 1929, and the de facto head coach was assistant Tom Lieb. Rockne's all-time All-America backfield was Jim Thorpe, Red Grange, George Gipp, and George Pfann.

== Personal life ==
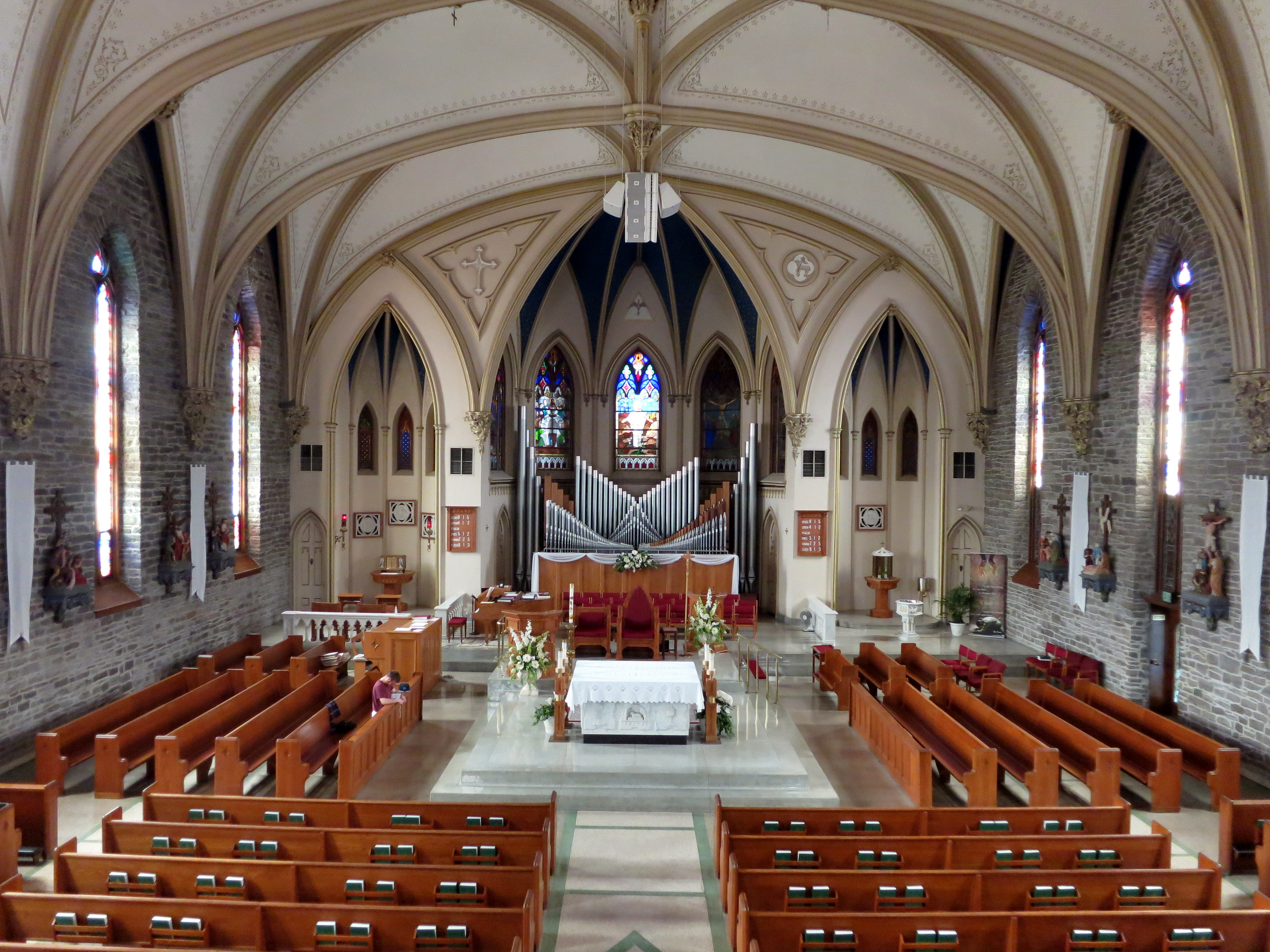
Interior of Saints Peter and Paul Church (Sandusky, Ohio)

Rockne met Bonnie Gwendoline Skiles (1891–1956) of Kenton, Ohio, an avid gardener, while the two were employed at Cedar Point. Bonnie was the daughter of George Skiles and Huldah Dry. The two married at Sts. Peter and Paul Catholic Church in Sandusky, Ohio, on July 14, 1914, with Father William F. Murphy officiating and Gus Dorais as best man. They had four children: Knute Lars Jr., William Dorias, Mary Jeane and John Vincent. Rockne converted from Lutheranism to the Catholic Church on November 20, 1925. The Rev. Vincent Mooney, C.S.C., baptized Rockne in the Log Chapel on Notre Dame's campus.

In 1986 his grandson, Paul Michael Rockne, was killed in the Edmond post office shooting.

== Plane crash and public reaction ==
Rockne died in the crash of a Transcontinental & Western Air airliner in Kansas on March 31, 1931, while en route to participate in the production of the film The Spirit of Notre Dame (released October 13, 1931). He had stopped in Kansas City to visit his two sons, Bill and Knute Jr., who were in boarding school there at the Pembroke-Country Day School. A little over an hour after taking off from Kansas City, one of the Fokker Trimotor's wings broke up in flight. The plane crashed into a wheat field near Bazaar, Kansas, killing Rockne and seven others.

Coincidentally, Jess Harper, Rockne's friend and the coach he had replaced at Notre Dame, lived approximately 100 miles (160 km) from the spot of the crash. Harper was called to make a positive identification of Rockne's body. A memorial dedicated to the victims stands on the spot where the plane crashed. The memorial is surrounded by a wire fence with wooden posts and was maintained for many years by James Heathman, who, at the age of 13 in 1931, was one of the first people to arrive at the site of the crash.

Rockne's unexpected death startled the nation and triggered a national outpouring of grief, comparable to the death of a president. President Herbert Hoover called Rockne's death "a national loss". King Haakon VII of Norway posthumously knighted Rockne and sent a personal envoy, Olaf Bernts, Norwegian consul in Chicago, to Rockne's funeral.

Rockne was buried in Highland Cemetery in South Bend, the city adjacent to the Notre Dame campus. Six of his players from the previous year (Marty Brill, Tom Yarr, Frank Carideo, Marchy Schwartz, Tom Conley, and Larry Mullins) carried him to his final resting place. More than 100,000 people lined the route of his funeral procession, and the funeral, held at the Basilica of the Sacred Heart, was broadcast live on network radio across the United States and in Europe as well as parts of South America and Asia. In 2024, Rockne was reinterred on the campus of Notre Dame.

Driven by the public feeling for Rockne, the crash story played out at length in nearly all the nation's newspapers and public demand for an inquiry into the crash's causes and circumstances ensued. The cause of the damage was determined to be that the plane's plywood outer skin was bonded to the ribs and spars with water-based aliphatic resin glue, and flight in rain had caused the bond to deteriorate to the point that sections of the plywood suddenly separated. The national outcry over the disaster triggered sweeping changes to aircraft design, manufacturing, operation, inspection, maintenance, regulation, and crash investigation, igniting a safety revolution that ultimately transformed airline travel worldwide from one of the most dangerous forms of travel to one of the safest.

== Legacy ==
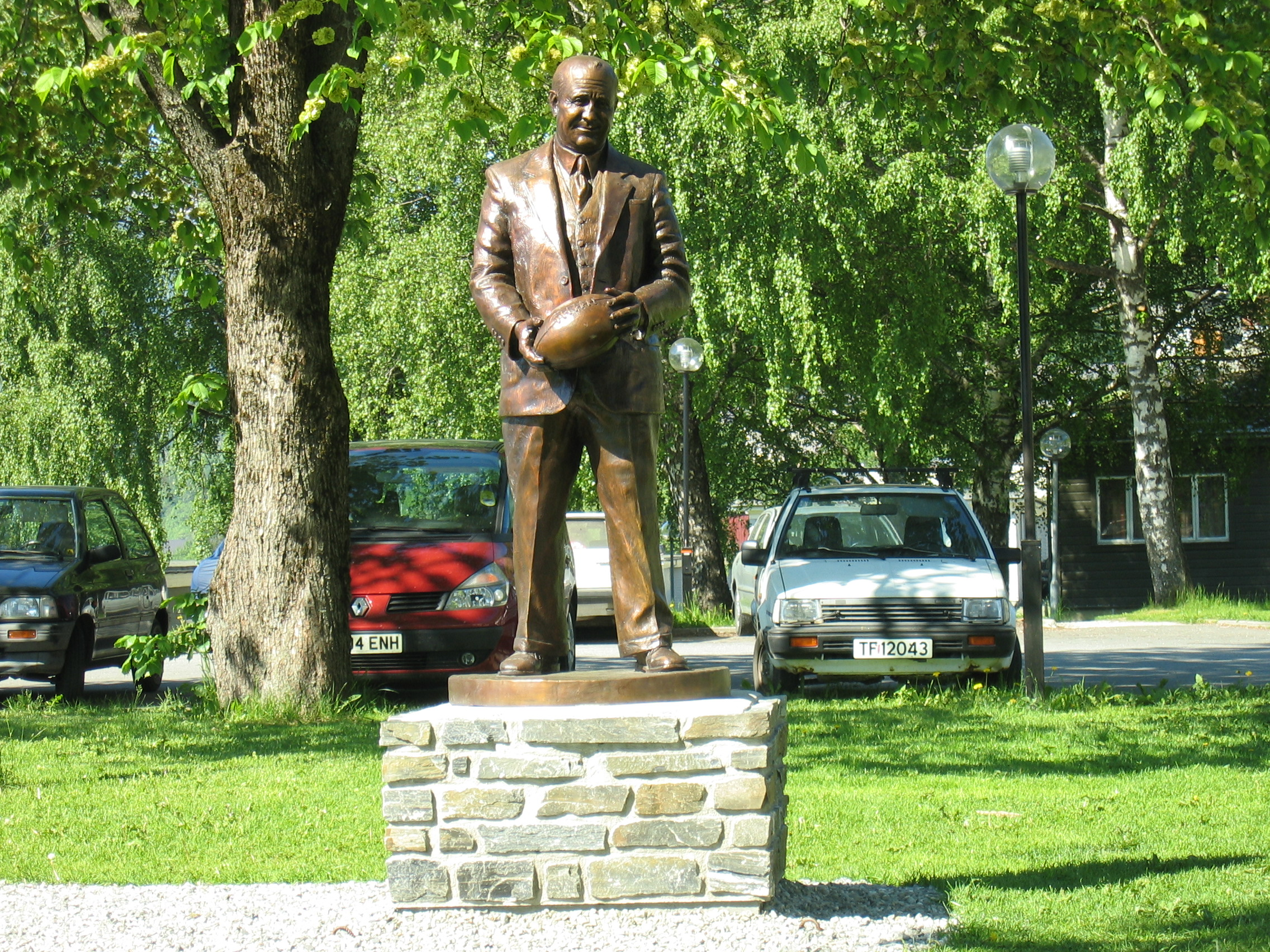
Knute Rockne bronze sculpture in Voss Municipality, Norway

Rockne was not the first coach to use the forward pass, but he helped popularize it nationally. Most football historians agree that a few schools, notably St. Louis University (under coach Eddie Cochems), Michigan, Carlisle, and Minnesota, had passing attacks in place before Rockne arrived at Notre Dame. The great majority of passing attacks, however, consisted solely of short pitches and shovel passes to stationary receivers. Additionally, few of the major Eastern teams that constituted the news media center of college football at the time used the pass.

In the summer of 1913, while he was a lifeguard on the beach at Cedar Point in Sandusky, Ohio, Rockne and his college teammate and roommate Gus Dorais worked on passing techniques. These were employed in games by the 1913 Notre Dame squad and subsequent Harper- and Rockne-coached teams and included many features common in modern passing, including having the passer throw the ball overhand and having the receiver run under a football and catch the ball in stride.

That fall, Notre Dame upset heavily favored Army 35–13 at West Point thanks to a barrage of Dorais-to-Rockne long downfield passes. The game played an important role in displaying the potency of the forward pass and "open offense" and convinced many coaches to add pass plays to their play books. The game is dramatized in the movies Knute Rockne, All American and The Long Gray Line.

There is a Knute Rockne Street in San Antonio, Texas.

=== Coaching tree ===
Rockne served under one head coach:

- Jesse Harper, Notre Dame (1914–1917)

31 of Rockne's former players at Notre Dame later became head coaches:

- Charlie Bachman, Northwestern (1919), Kansas State (1920–1927), Florida (1928–1932), Michigan State (1933–1942), Camp Grant (1943), Michigan State (1944–1946), Hillsdale (1953)
- Dutch Bergman, New Mexico A&M (1920–1922), Catholic (1930–1940), Washington Redskins (1943)
- Stan Cofall, Cleveland Tigers (1920), Loyola (MD) (1925–1927), Wake Forest (1928)
- Curly Lambeau, Green Bay Packers (1920−1949), Chicago Cardinals (1950–1951), Washington Redskins (1952–1953)
- Slip Madigan, Columbia (OR) (1920), Saint Mary's (1921–1939), Iowa (1943–1944)
- Jack Meagher, St. Edward's (1921–1928), Rice (1929–1933), Auburn (1934–1942), Iowa Pre-Flight (1944), Miami Seahawks (1946)
- Clipper Smith, Columbia (OR) (1921–1924), Gonzaga (1925–1928), Santa Clara (1929–1935), Villanova (1936–1942), Cherry Point Marines (1944), San Francisco (1946), Boston Yanks (1947–1948), Lafayette (1949–1951)
- Eddie Anderson, Columbia (IA) (1922–1924), DePaul (1925–1931), Holy Cross (1933–1938), Iowa (1939–1942, 1946–1949), Holy Cross (1950–1964)
- Chet A. Wynne, Midland (1922), Creighton (1923–1929), Auburn (1930–1933), Kentucky (1934–1937)
- Buck Shaw, NC State (1924), Nevada (1925–1928), Santa Clara (1936–1942), California (1945), San Francisco 49ers (1946–1954), Air Force (1956–1957), Philadelphia Eagles (1958–1960)
- Elmer Layden, Columbia (IA) (1925–1926), Duquesne (1927–1933), Notre Dame (1934–1940)
- Harry Stuhldreher, Villanova (1925–1935), Wisconsin (1936–1948)
- Frank Thomas, Chattanooga (1925–1928), Alabama (1931–1946)
- Adam Walsh, Santa Clara (1925–1928), Bowdoin (1935–1942), Cleveland/Los Angeles Rams (1945–1946), Bowdoin (1947–1958)
- Chuck Collins, North Carolina (1926–1933)
- Clem Crowe, Saint Vincent (1926–1931), Xavier (1935–1943), Iowa (1945), Buffalo Bills (1949), Baltimore Colts (1950), Ottawa Rough Riders (1951–1954), BC Lions (1956–1958)
- Hunk Anderson, Saint Louis (1928–1929), Notre Dame (1931–1933), NC State (1934–1936), Chicago Bears (1942–1945)
- Jim Crowley, Michigan State (1928–1932), Fordham (1933–1941), North Carolina Pre-Flight (1942), Sampson NTS (1943), Chicago Rockets (1947)
- Harry Mehre, Georgia (1928–1937), Ole Miss (1938–1945)
- Noble Kizer, Purdue (1930–1936)
- Tom Lieb, Loyola (CA) (1930–1938), Florida (1940–1945)
- Edgar Miller, Navy (1931–1933)
- Chuck Riley, New Mexico (1931–1933)
- Frank Carideo, Missouri (1932–1934)
- Larry Mullins, St. Benedict's (1932–1936), Loyola (LA) (1937–1939), St. Ambrose (1940), Corpus Christi NAS (1945), St. Ambrose (1947–1950)
- Joe Bach, Duquesne (1934), Pittsburgh Pirates (1935–1936), Niagara (1937–1941), Fort Knox (1942), St. Bonaventure (1950–1951), Pittsburgh Steelers (1952–1953)
- Marchmont Schwartz, Creighton (1935–1939), Stanford (1942–1950)
- Rex Enright, South Carolina (1938–1942), Georgia Pre-Flight (1943), South Carolina (1946–1955)
- Frank Leahy, Boston College (1939–1940), Notre Dame (1941–1943, 1946–1953)
- Earl Walsh, Fordham (1942)

Assistant coaches under Rockne who later became head coaches:

- Gus Dorais, Gonzaga (1920–1924), Detroit (1925–1942), Detroit Lions (1943–1947)

=== Memorials ===
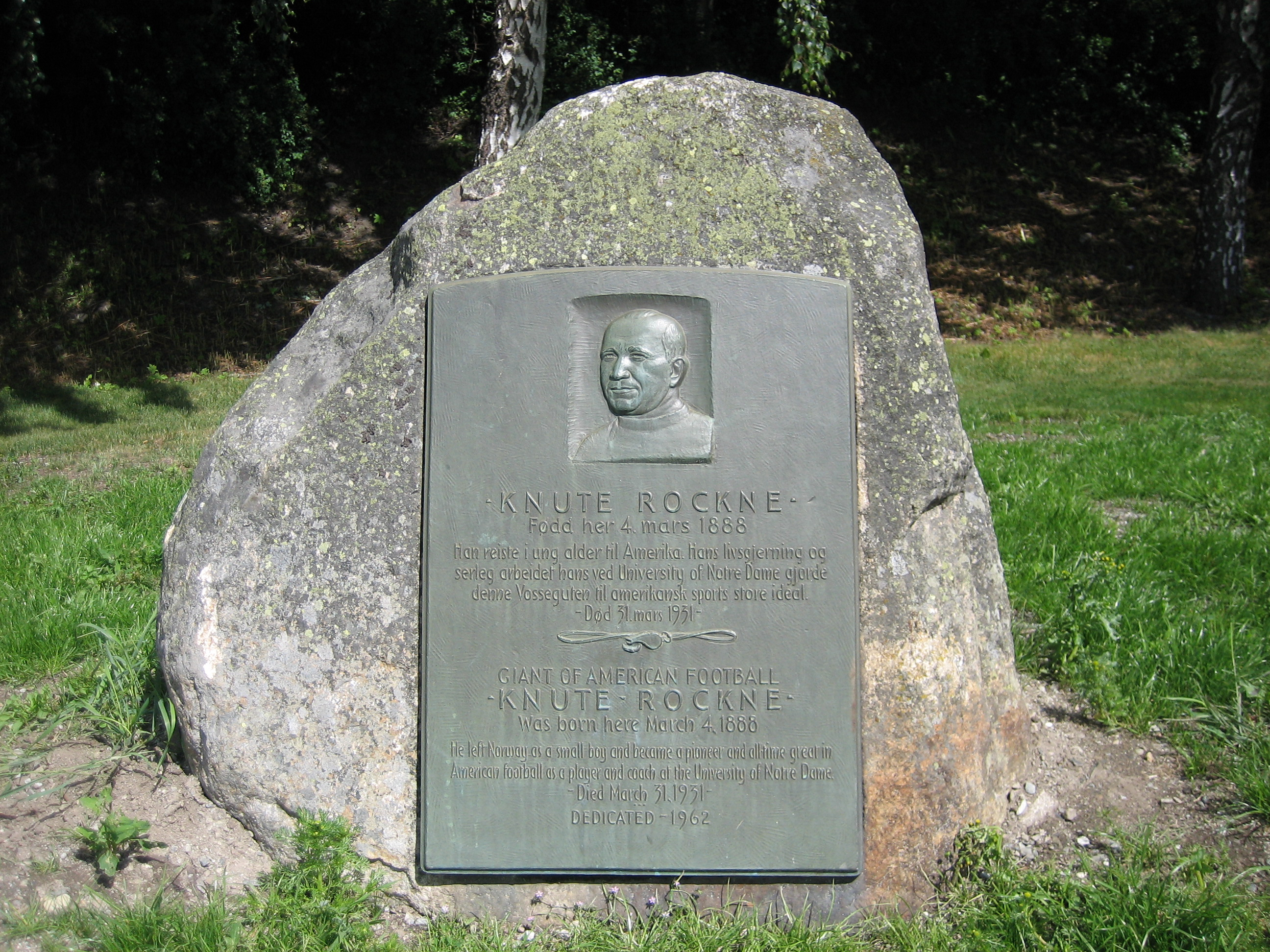
Memorial plaque to Knute Rockne in his birthplace of Voss Municipality, Norway

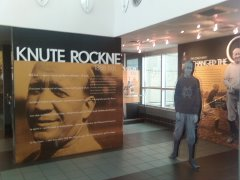
Former Knute Rockne memorial on the Kansas Turnpike

- Notre Dame memorializes him in the Knute Rockne Memorial Building, an athletics facility built in 1937, as well as the main football stadium.
- Knute Rockne Stadium in Chicago, one of seven municipally-owned stadiums operated by Chicago Public Schools, is named for Rockne
- His name appears on streets in South Bend and in Stevensville, Michigan, (where Rockne had a summer home), and a travel plaza on the Indiana Toll Road.
- The Rockne Memorial near Bazaar, Kansas at the site of the airliner crash memorializes Rockne and the seven others who died with him. It was erected by the late Easter Heathman, who as a boy was a crash eyewitness and was among the first to respond at the scene. Every five years since the crash, a memorial ceremony is held there and at a nearby schoolhouse, drawing relatives of the victims and Rockne and Notre Dame fans from around the world. Now part of the Heathman family estate, it is accessible only by arrangement or during memorial commemorations.
- The Matfield Green rest stop travel plaza (center foyer) on the Kansas Turnpike near Bazaar and the airliner crash site where Rockne was killed used to have a large, glassed-in exhibit commemorating Rockne (chiefly), the other crash victims, and the crash itself. The memorial was taken down during renovations of the travel plaza.
- In 1941, Allentown Central Catholic High School in Allentown, Pennsylvania dedicated its gymnasium, Rockne Hall, to Knute Rockne.
- Taylorville, Illinois dedicated the street next to the football field as "Knute Rockne Road".
- The town of Rockne, Texas was named to honor him. In 1931, the children of Sacred Heart School were given the opportunity to name their town. A vote was taken, with the children electing to name the town after Rockne, who had died in a plane crash earlier that year. On March 10, 1988, Rockne opened its post office for one day during which a Knute Rockne 22-cent commemorative stamp was issued. A life-size bust of Rockne was unveiled on March 4, 2006.
- The Studebaker automobile company of South Bend marketed the Rockne automobile from 1931 to 1933. It was a separate product line of Studebaker and priced in the low-cost market.
- Symphonic composer Ferde Grofe composed a musical suite in Rockne's honor shortly after the coach's death.
- In 1940, actor Pat O'Brien portrayed Rockne in the Warner Brothers film Knute Rockne, All American, in which Rockne used the phrase "win one for the Gipper" in reference to the death bed request of George Gipp, played by Ronald Reagan.
- The short film I Am an American (1944) featured Rockne as a foreign-born citizen
- Rockne was enshrined in the College Football Hall of Fame in 1951 as a charter member and in the Indiana Football Hall of Fame.
- In 1988, the United States Postal Service honored Rockne with a 22-cent commemorative postage stamp. President Ronald Reagan, who played George Gipp in the movie Knute Rockne, All American, gave an address at the Athletic & Convocation Center at the University of Notre Dame on March 9, 1988, and officially unveiled the Rockne stamp.
- In 1988, Rockne was inducted posthumously into the Scandinavian-American Hall of Fame held during Norsk Høstfest.
- A biographical musical of Rockne's life premiered at the Theatre at the Center in Munster, Indiana on April 3, 2008. The musical is based on a play and mini-series by Buddy Farmer.
- The U.S. Navy named a ship in the Liberty ship class after Rockne in 1943. The SS Knute Rockne was scrapped in 1972.
- A statue of Rockne, as well as Ara Parseghian, both by the sculptor Armando Hinojosa of Laredo, Texas, are located on the Notre Dame campus.
- He was inducted into the Rose Bowl Hall of Fame as a member of the Class of 2014.

== Head coaching record ==
Year	Team	Overall	Bowl/playoffs
Notre Dame Fighting Irish (Independent) (1918–1930)
1918	Notre Dame	3–1–2	
1919	Notre Dame	9–0	
1920	Notre Dame	9–0	
1921	Notre Dame	10–1	
1922	Notre Dame	8–1–1	
1923	Notre Dame	9–1	
1924	Notre Dame	10–0	W Rose
1925	Notre Dame	7–2–1	
1926	Notre Dame	9–1	
1927	Notre Dame	7–1–1	
1928	Notre Dame	5–4	
1929	Notre Dame	9–0	
1930	Notre Dame	10–0	
Notre Dame:		105–12–5	
Total:		105–12–5	
National championship Conference title Conference division title or championship game berth

== Works ==
- — (1925). The Four Winners: The Head, the Hands, the Foot, the Ball. New York: The Devin-Adair Company. OCLC 1402907290.
- — (1925). Coaching, the Way of the Winner. New York: The Devin-Adair Company. OCLC 1375465155.
- —; Meanwell, Walter Ernest (1931). Training, Conditioning and the Care of Injuries. Madison, Wisc.: Walter E. Meanwell. OCLC 1089918897.
- — (1931). Rockne, Bonnie Skiles (ed.). The Autobiography of Knute K. Rockne. With Introduction and Post Script by Rev. John J. Cavanaugh. Indianapolis: Bobbs-Merrill Co. OCLC 2093736.

== See also ==
- List of college football career coaching winning percentage leaders
- List of teachers portrayed in films
