= Bazaar, Kansas =

Unincorporated community in Chase County, Kansas

- Unincorporated community
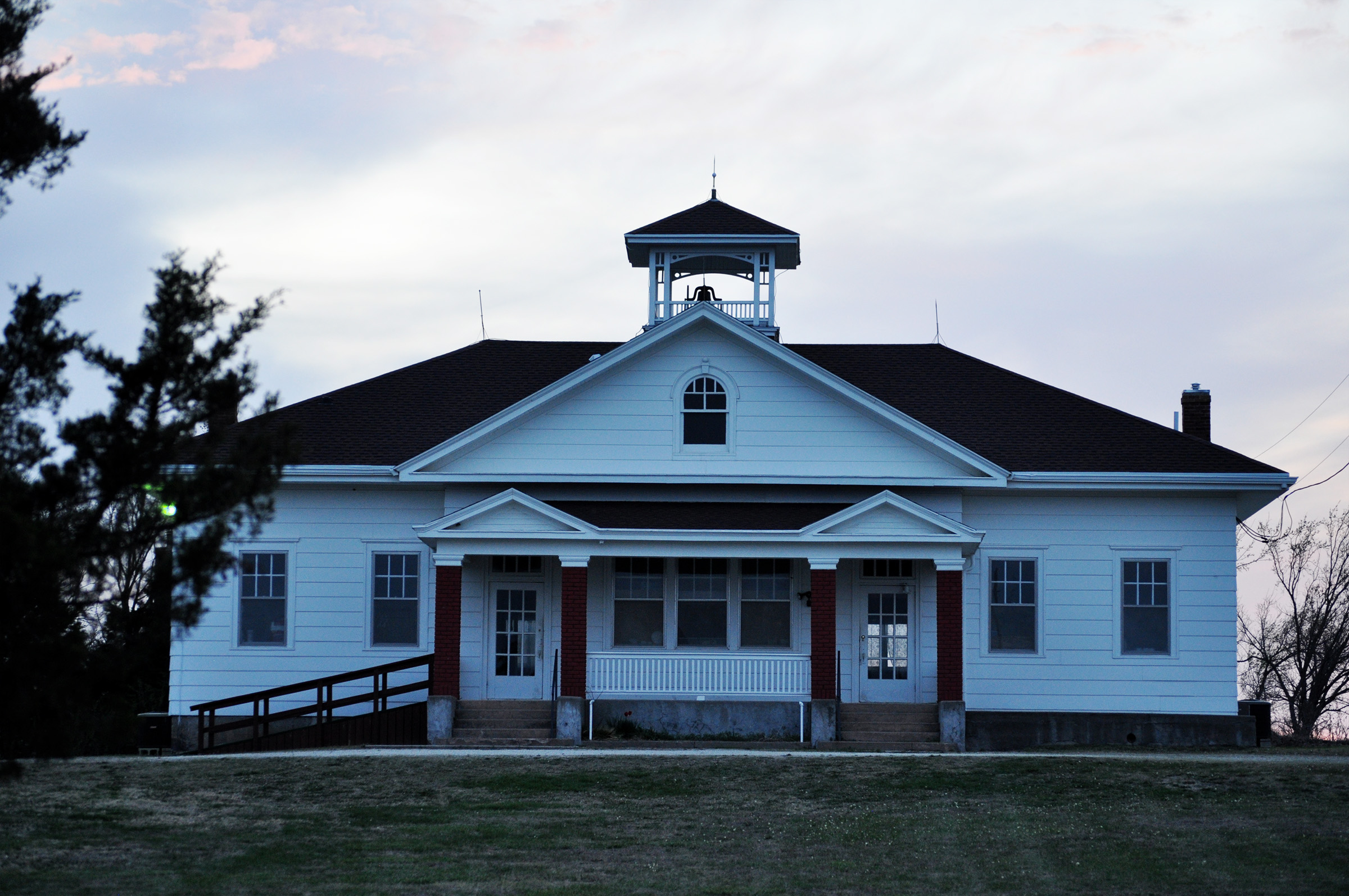
- Old Bazaar schoolhouse (2016)

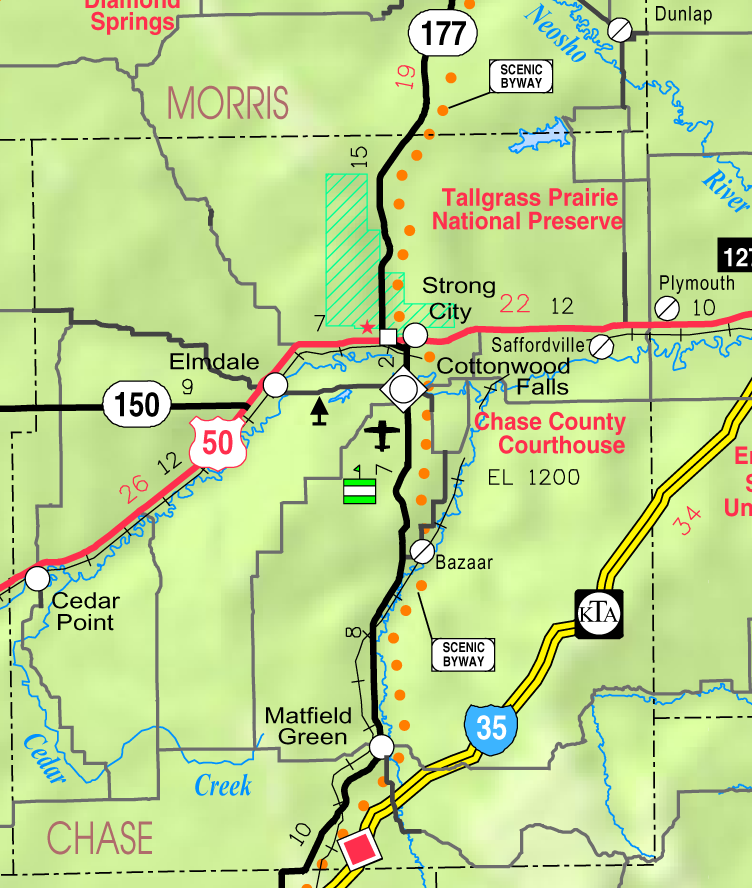
- KDOT map of Chase County (legend)

- Location within Kansas Location within the United States
- Coordinates: 38.2719604°N 96.5352854°W
- Country: United States
- State: Kansas
- County: Chase
- Township: Bazaar
- Elevation: 1,221 ft (372 m)
- Time zone: UTC-6 (CST)
  - Summer (DST): UTC-5 (CDT)
- Area code: 620
- GNIS ID: 477396

Bazaar is an unincorporated community in Chase County, Kansas, United States. It is located about halfway between Strong City and Matfield Green near the intersection of K-177 highway and Sharps Creek Rd.

== History ==
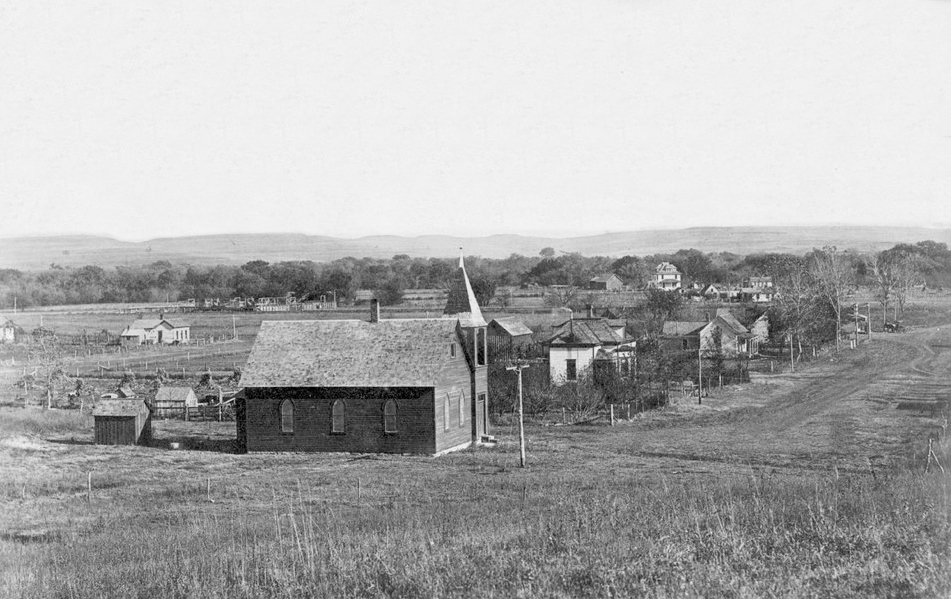
Bazaar, circa 1900-1909

A post office was established in Bazaar on April 16, 1860. The post office was renamed "Mary" on July 20, 1876, and then back to Bazaar on March 19, 1878. The post office closed on April 26, 1974.

On March 31, 1931, a Transcontinental & Western Air airliner crashed a few miles southwest of Bazaar, killing all on board, including University of Notre Dame coach Knute Rockne. There is a monument located on private property at 38°14′09″N 96°35′12″W, and yearly tours provide access to the site.

Bazaar still serves as a rail depot for local cattle ranching.

Additionally several large ranches are owned by Texas oil billionaire Ed Bass and The Nature Conservancy, most of which is the Flint Hills section that overlaps the city and remains primarily for conservation purposes of the Flint Hills.

== Geography ==
Bazaar is located in the Flint Hills region of the Great Plains. By highway, it is 18 miles (29 km) north of the Kansas Turnpike toll road exit at Cassoday, or 7 miles (11 km) south of the U.S. Route 50 exit at Strong City.

== Demographics ==
The community is part of the Emporia Micropolitan Statistical Area.

== Education ==
The community is served by Chase County USD 284 public school district. It has two schools.

== Transportation ==
K-177 highway and Southern Transcon main line of BNSF Railway both pass north–south through Bazaar.
