= Jacobs Creek =

Jacobs Creek, Jacob's Creek or Jacob Creek may refer to:

== Places ==
=== In Australia ===
- Jacobs Creek (Australia), a tributary of the North Para River
- Jacobs Creek (Victoria), a tributary of the Tyers River
- Jacob's Creek (wine), a brand of Australian wine
- Jacob's Creek Open Championship, a golf tournament

=== In Canada ===
- Jacob Creek (Alberta)

=== In the United States ===
- Jacobs Creek (Kansas), a tributary of the Cottonwood River
- Jacobs Creek (Missouri), a tributary of Hazel Run
- Jacobs Creek (New Jersey), a tributary of the Delaware River
- Jacobs Creek (Youghiogheny River tributary), in Pennsylvania
- Jacobs Creek (Monongahela River tributary), a stream in Fayette County, Pennsylvania
- Jacobs Creek, Pennsylvania, a community in Westmoreland County

== Other ==
- Jacobs Creek flood, Kansas, USA
- Jacobs Creek, a late 1960s band, founded by Lon & Derrek Van Eaton
