= Fort Drinkwater =

Fort Drinkwater, in western Chase County, Kansas, was built in 1857 by Orlo H. Drinkwater and W. L. Fowler on Drinkwater's farm. The fort served the area settlers as a refuge during Indian disturbances until 1868. It was built along what called Cedar Creek, or Cottonwood River. In 1862, Drinkwater became the area's postmaster and his fort home served as the post office for several years, until the town of Cedar Point, Kansas, was established a mile to the west.
