= Jacobs =

Jacobs may refer to:

== Businesses and organisations ==
- Jacob's, a brand name for several lines of biscuits and crackers in Ireland and the UK
- Jacobs (coffee), a German brand of coffee
- Jacobs Solutions, an American international technical professional services firm
- Jacobs Aircraft Engine Company, former American aircraft engine company
- Jacobs Entertainment, an American gaming, hospitality, and entertainment company
- Jacobs School of Medicine and Biomedical Sciences, at the University at Buffalo, New York, U.S.
- Jacobs School of Music, at, Indiana University, U.S.
- Jacobs University Bremen, in Germany

== People ==
- Jacobs (surname), including a list of people with this name

== Places ==
- Jacobs, Louisville, Kentucky, U.S.
- Jacobs, Pennsylvania, U.S., now Port Providence
- Jacobs, Wisconsin, U.S.
- Jacobs Island, Antarctica

== Other uses ==
- Jacobs F.C., a former Irish football club
- ST Jacobs, a tug, formerly Empire Gnome
- XYY syndrome, also known as Jacobs Syndrome, in which a male has an extra Y chromosome

== See also ==
- Jacob (disambiguation)
- Jacobs Creek (disambiguation)
- Jacobs River (disambiguation)
- Justice Jacobs (disambiguation)
- St. Jacobs, Ontario, Canada
- Jacobs Field, former name of Progressive Field in Cleveland, Ohio, U.S.
