= National Register of Historic Places listings in Marion County, Kansas =

Location of Marion County in Kansas

This is a list of the National Register of Historic Places listings in Marion County, Kansas.

This is intended to be a complete list of the properties and districts on the National Register of Historic Places in Marion County, Kansas, United States. The locations of National Register properties and districts for which the latitude and longitude coordinates are included below, may be seen in a map.

There are 32 properties and districts listed on the National Register in the county.

This National Park Service list is complete through NPS recent listings posted December 19, 2025.

== Current listings ==
	Name on the Register	Image	Date listed	Location	City or town	Description
1	1927 Hillsboro Water Tower	1927 Hillsboro Water Tower	October 6, 2011 (#11000727)	Lots 10 & 11, Block 2, Hill's 2nd Addition; 38°21′15″N 97°12′25″W	Hillsboro	
2	Amelia Park Bridge	Amelia Park Bridge	January 21, 2004 (#03001467)	0.5 miles west of U.S. Route 77 on 260th Street (approximate 1 mile north-east of Antelope); 38°26′47″N 96°57′58″W	Antelope	
3	Battey House		December 22, 2025 (#100012440)	343 W Eighth Street; 38°14′44″N 96°55′54″W	Florence	
4	Bethel School	Bethel School	December 17, 1987 (#87002114)	5.25 miles east of Lincolnville on 290th Street; 38°29′37″N 96°51′38″W	Lincolnville	
5	Bichet School, District 34	Bichet School, District 34	January 28, 2004 (#03001498)	4.5 miles east of Florence on U.S. Route 50, then 0.1 mile north on Bluestem Road; 38°15′08″N 96°50′53″W	Florence	
6	Bown-Corby School	Bown-Corby School	April 14, 2015 (#15000146)	412 N. 2nd St. 38°21′04″N 97°01′17″W	Marion	
7	Burns Union School	Burns Union School	March 26, 1975 (#75000714)	Southwest corner of Ohio and Main Streets; 38°05′20″N 96°53′14″W	Burns	Currently the Burns Community Museum.
8	Donahue's Santa Fe Trail Segment		October 11, 2016 (#16000705)	Address Restricted	Durham	
9	Donaldson and Hosmer Building	Donaldson and Hosmer Building	September 23, 2020 (#100005122)	318 East Main St. 38°20′54″N 97°01′11″W	Marion	
10	Doyle Place	Doyle Place	October 11, 2000 (#98000266)	0.3 mile south of Florence railroad track on Main Street; 38°14′04″N 96°55′33″W	Florence	
11	Elgin Hotel	Elgin Hotel	September 13, 1978 (#78001286)	115 North 3rd Street; 38°20′56″N 97°01′11″W	Marion	
12	Florence Opera House	Florence Opera House	January 18, 2011 (#10001142)	Southwest corner of 5th and Main Streets; 38°14′32″N 96°55′36″W	Florence	
13	Florence Water Tower	Florence Water Tower	May 6, 1973 (#09000275)	525 West 5th Street; 38°14′31″N 96°56′02″W	Florence	
14	French Frank's Santa Fe Trail Segment		April 3, 2013 (#13000131)	Address Restricted	Lehigh	
15	Harvey House	Harvey House	August 14, 1973 (#73000763)	221 North Marion Street; 38°14′24″N 96°55′41″W	Florence	See Fred Harvey Company.
16	Hill Grade School	Hill Grade School	May 28, 1976 (#76000827)	601 East Main Street; 38°20′54″N 97°00′54″W	Marion	
17	Island Field Ranch House	Island Field Ranch House	May 11, 1995 (#95000579)	3.5 miles south of Lincolnville on U.S. Route 77 (1 mile east of Antelope); 38°26′13″N 96°57′28″W	Lincolnville	
18	Keystone Ranch	Keystone Ranch	July 10, 2017 (#100001290)	2910 47th Terrace; 38°08′50″N 96°51′17″W	Burns	
19	Lost Spring	Lost Spring	September 30, 1976 (#76000826)	2.5 miles west of Lost Springs on 340th Street; 38°34′00″N 97°00′46″W	Lost Springs	The original Lost Spring is inaccessible, but a Lost Spring Ranche was established nearby. It became Lost Spring Station.
20	Marion Archeological District		April 21, 1976 (#76000829)	Various locations along Mud Creek and the Cottonwood River; 38°21′54″N 97°01′06″W	Marion	
21	Marion County Courthouse	Marion County Courthouse	May 28, 1976 (#76000828)	200 South 3rd Street; 38°20′50″N 97°01′09″W	Marion	
22	Marion County Park and Lake	Marion County Park and Lake	June 6, 2002 (#02000607)	1 mile east of Marion on 190th Street (Main), then 1.75 miles south on Upland Road; 38°19′14″N 96°58′59″W	Marion	
23	P.H. Meehan House	P.H. Meehan House	November 28, 2007 (#07001227)	401 North Columbus Street; 38°32′54″N 97°09′22″W	Tampa	
24	W.H. Morgan House	W.H. Morgan House	January 22, 1996 (#95001562)	212 North Walnut Street; 38°10′01″N 97°06′23″W	Peabody	
25	Old Peabody Library	Old Peabody Library	July 2, 1973 (#73000765)	106 East Division Avenue; 38°10′02″N 97°06′22″W	Peabody	Currently the Peabody Historical Museum.
26	Peabody City Park	Peabody City Park	January 20, 2012 (#11001032)	W. 2nd and Locust Sts. 38°09′58″N 97°06′45″W	Peabody	
27	Peabody Downtown Historic District	Peabody Downtown Historic District	May 29, 1998 (#98000590)	Walnut Street area, between Division and First Streets; 38°09′57″N 97°06′25″W	Peabody	
28	Peabody Township Carnegie Library	Peabody Township Carnegie Library	June 25, 1987 (#87000959)	214 North Walnut Street; 38°10′02″N 97°06′24″W	Peabody	Currently the Peabody Township Library.
29	Pioneer Adobe House	Pioneer Adobe House	March 30, 1973 (#73000764)	501 South Ash Street; 38°20′51″N 97°12′23″W	Hillsboro	Currently the Peter Paul Loewen House.
30	Santa Fe Trail - Marion County Trail Segments	Santa Fe Trail - Marion County Trail Segments	May 11, 1995 (#95000584)	From corner of 270th St and Falcon Rd, parallels on west side of railroad tracks towards southwest 38°27′26″N 97°16′39″W	Durham	
31	William F. and Ida G. Schaeffler House	William F. and Ida G. Schaeffler House	May 16, 2002 (#02000490)	312 East Grand Avenue; 38°21′15″N 97°12′02″W	Hillsboro	Currently the William F. Schaeffler House Museum. Restoration work was done in 2018.
32	J.S. Schroeder Building	J.S. Schroeder Building	December 6, 1991 (#91001770)	111 North Walnut Street; 38°09′54″N 97°06′13″W	Peabody	

== See also ==
- List of National Historic Landmarks in Kansas
- National Register of Historic Places listings in Kansas
