= Cedar Point, Kansas =

City in Chase County, Kansas

- City
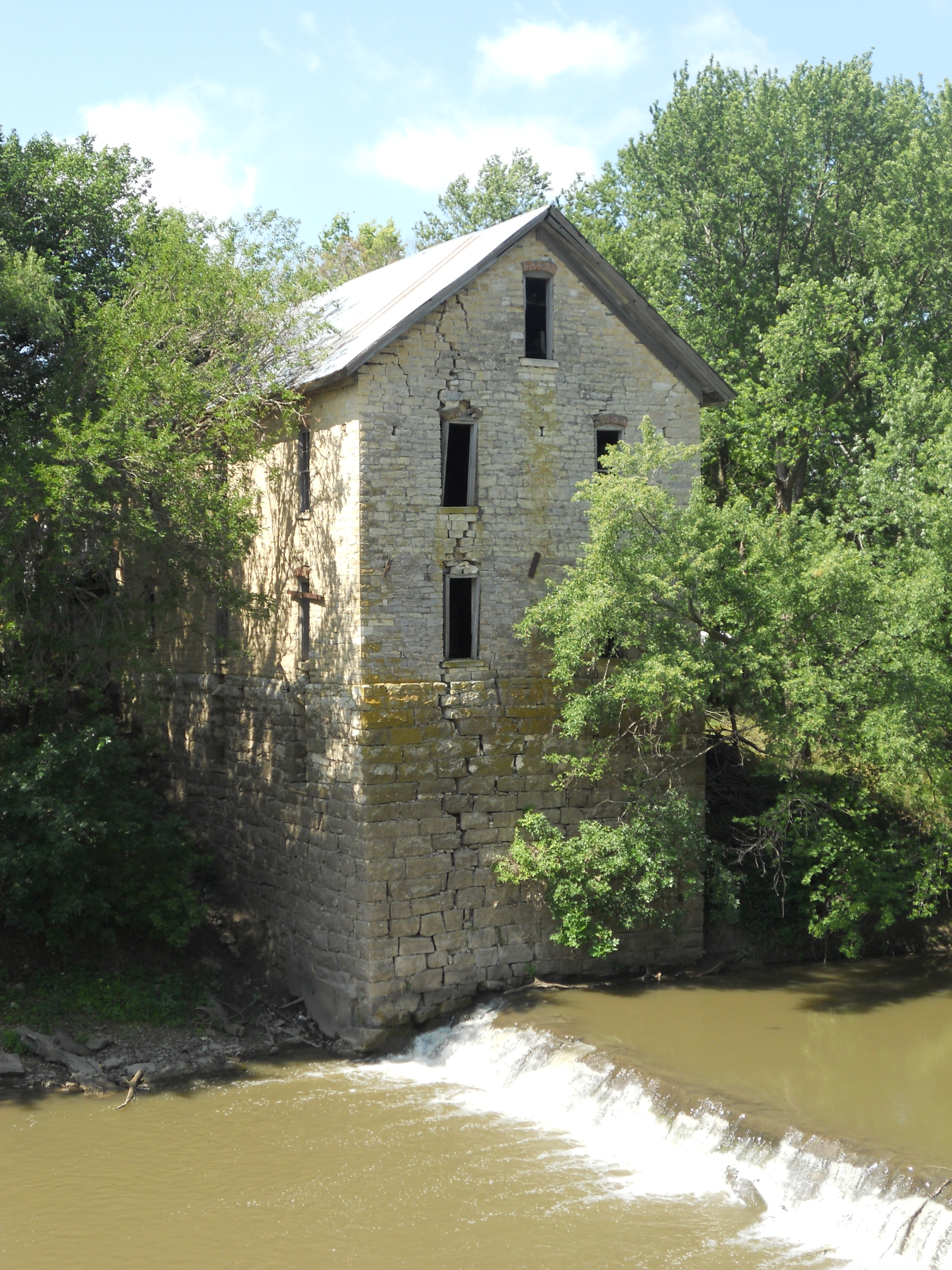
- North side of 1875 Cedar Point Mill next to Cottonwood River (2012)

- Location within Chase County and Kansas

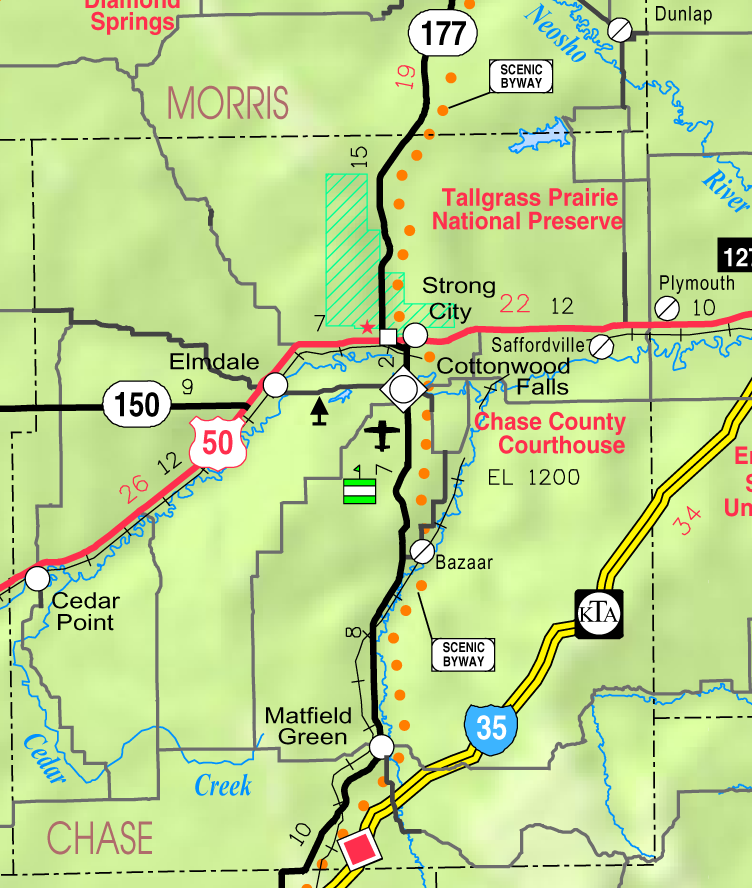
- KDOT map of Chase County (legend)
- Coordinates: 38°15′36″N 96°49′11″W
- Country: United States
- State: Kansas
- County: Chase
- Township: Cottonwood
- Founded: 1862
- Incorporated: 1912

Government
  - Type: Mayor–Council

Area
  - Total: 0.069 sq mi (0.18 km^{2})
  - Land: 0.066 sq mi (0.17 km^{2})
  - Water: 0 sq mi (0.00 km^{2})
- Elevation: 1,247 ft (380 m)

Population (2020)
  - Total: 22
  - Density: 340/sq mi (130/km^{2})
- Time zone: UTC-6 (CST)
  - Summer (DST): UTC-5 (CDT)
- ZIP Code: 66843
- Area code: 620
- FIPS code: 20-11425
- GNIS ID: 477384

Cedar Point is a city in Chase County, Kansas, United States. As of the 2020 census, the population of the city was 22. It is approximately five miles east of Florence and 0.5 mile south of U.S. Route 50 highway.

== History ==
=== Early history ===
For many millennia, the Great Plains of North America was inhabited by nomadic Native Americans. From the 16th century to 18th century, the Kingdom of France claimed ownership of large parts of North America. In 1762, after the French and Indian War, France secretly ceded New France to Spain, per the Treaty of Fontainebleau.

=== 19th century ===
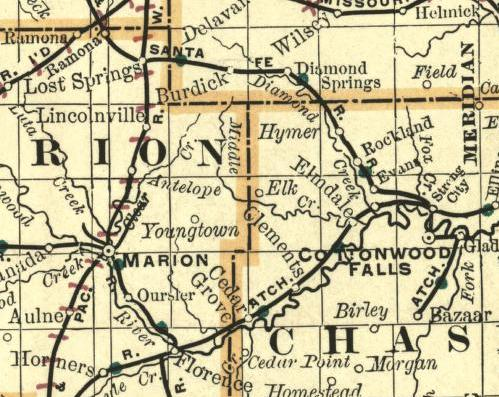
1893 railroad map shows "Cedar Point" and "Cedar Grove"

In 1802, Spain returned most of the land to France. In 1803, most of the land for modern day Kansas was acquired by the United States from France as part of the 828,000 square mile Louisiana Purchase for 2.83 cents per acre.

In 1806, Zebulon Pike led the Pike Expedition westward from St Louis, Missouri, of which part of their journey followed the Cottonwood River through Chase County near the current city of Cedar Point.

In 1854, the Kansas Territory was organized, then in 1861 Kansas became the 34th U.S. state. In 1855, Marion County was established within the Kansas Territory, which included the land for modern day Cedar Point.

In 1862, Cedar Point was founded. The first post office in Cedar Point was established in 1862.

In 1867, a log dam was built across the Cottonwood River, and a wooden-frame mill was constructed for sawing lumber. The following year (1868) it was converted to grind flour and named Cedar Point Mill. In 1870, the name was changed to Drinkwater & Schriver Mill. In 1871, construction of the current stone structure was started, then completed in 1875. In 1884, the log dam was replaced by a stone dam.

In 1871, the Atchison, Topeka and Santa Fe Railway built a main line east–west and built a nearby station named Cedar Grove in the valley north of Cedar Point. In 1996, it merged with Burlington Northern Railroad and renamed to the current BNSF Railway. Most locals still refer to this railroad as the "Santa Fe".

== Geography ==
Cedar Point is located at 38°15′39″N 96°49′18″W (38.260888, -96.821662), in the scenic Flint Hills of the Great Plains. According to the United States Census Bureau, the city has a total area of 0.08 square miles (0.21 km^{2}), all land.

== Area attractions ==
Cedar Point has two listings on the National Register of Historic Places (NRHP).

- 1875 Cedar Point Mill (NRHP).
- 1916 Cottonwood River Pratt Truss Bridge (NRHP). Located west of the city.

== Demographics ==
Historical population
Census	Pop.	Note	%±
1880	113		—
1920	190		—
1930	141		−25.8%
1940	140		−0.7%
1950	107		−23.6%
1960	87		−18.7%
1970	73		−16.1%
1980	66		−9.6%
1990	39		−40.9%
2000	53		35.9%
2010	28		−47.2%
2020	22		−21.4%
U.S. Decennial Census

Cedar Point is part of the Emporia Micropolitan Statistical Area.

=== 2020 census ===
The 2020 United States census counted 22 people, 6 households, and 4 families in Cedar Point. The population density was 323.5 per square mile (124.9/km^{2}). There were 20 housing units at an average density of 294.1 per square mile (113.6/km^{2}). The racial makeup was 86.36% (19) white or European American (86.36% non-Hispanic white), 0.0% (0) black or African-American, 0.0% (0) Native American or Alaska Native, 0.0% (0) Asian, 0.0% (0) Pacific Islander or Native Hawaiian, 4.55% (1) from other races, and 9.09% (2) from two or more races. Hispanic or Latino of any race was 4.55% (1) of the population.

Of the 6 households, 50.0% had children under the age of 18; 33.3% were married couples living together; 33.3% had a female householder with no spouse or partner present. 16.7% of households consisted of individuals and 0.0% had someone living alone who was 65 years of age or older. The average household size was 2.0 and the average family size was 2.0. The percent of those with a bachelor's degree or higher was estimated to be 0.0% of the population.

31.8% of the population was under the age of 18, 18.2% from 18 to 24, 9.1% from 25 to 44, 27.3% from 45 to 64, and 13.6% who were 65 years of age or older. The median age was 26.0 years. For every 100 females, there were 69.2 males. For every 100 females ages 18 and older, there were 66.7 males.

=== 2010 census ===
As of the census of 2010, there were 28 people, 13 households, and 5 families residing in the city. The population density was 350.0 inhabitants per square mile (135.1/km^{2}). There were 25 housing units at an average density of 312.5 per square mile (120.7/km^{2}). The racial makeup of the city was 96.4% White and 3.6% from two or more races.

There were 13 households, of which 23.1% had children under the age of 18 living with them, 30.8% were married couples living together, 7.7% had a male householder with no wife present, and 61.5% were non-families. 46.2% of all households were made up of individuals, and 38.5% had someone living alone who was 65 years of age or older. The average household size was 2.15 and the average family size was 3.60.

The median age in the city was 51.5 years. 28.6% of residents were under the age of 18; 0% were between the ages of 18 and 24; 10.7% were from 25 to 44; 32% were from 45 to 64; and 28.6% were 65 years of age or older. The gender makeup of the city was 53.6% male and 46.4% female.

== Government ==
The Cedar Point governing body consists of a mayor and three council members. The council meets once a month.

== Education ==
The community is served by Chase County USD 284 public school district. It has two schools.

- Chase County Junior/Senior High School, 600 Main St in Cottonwood Falls.
- Chase County Elementary School, 401 Maple St in Cottonwood Falls.

Cedar Point schools were closed through school unification. The Cedar Point High School mascot was Cedar Point Bronchos.

== Media ==
=== Print ===
- Marion County Record, official newspaper for Marion County.
- Hillsboro Free Press, free newspaper for greater Marion County area.

== Infrastructure ==
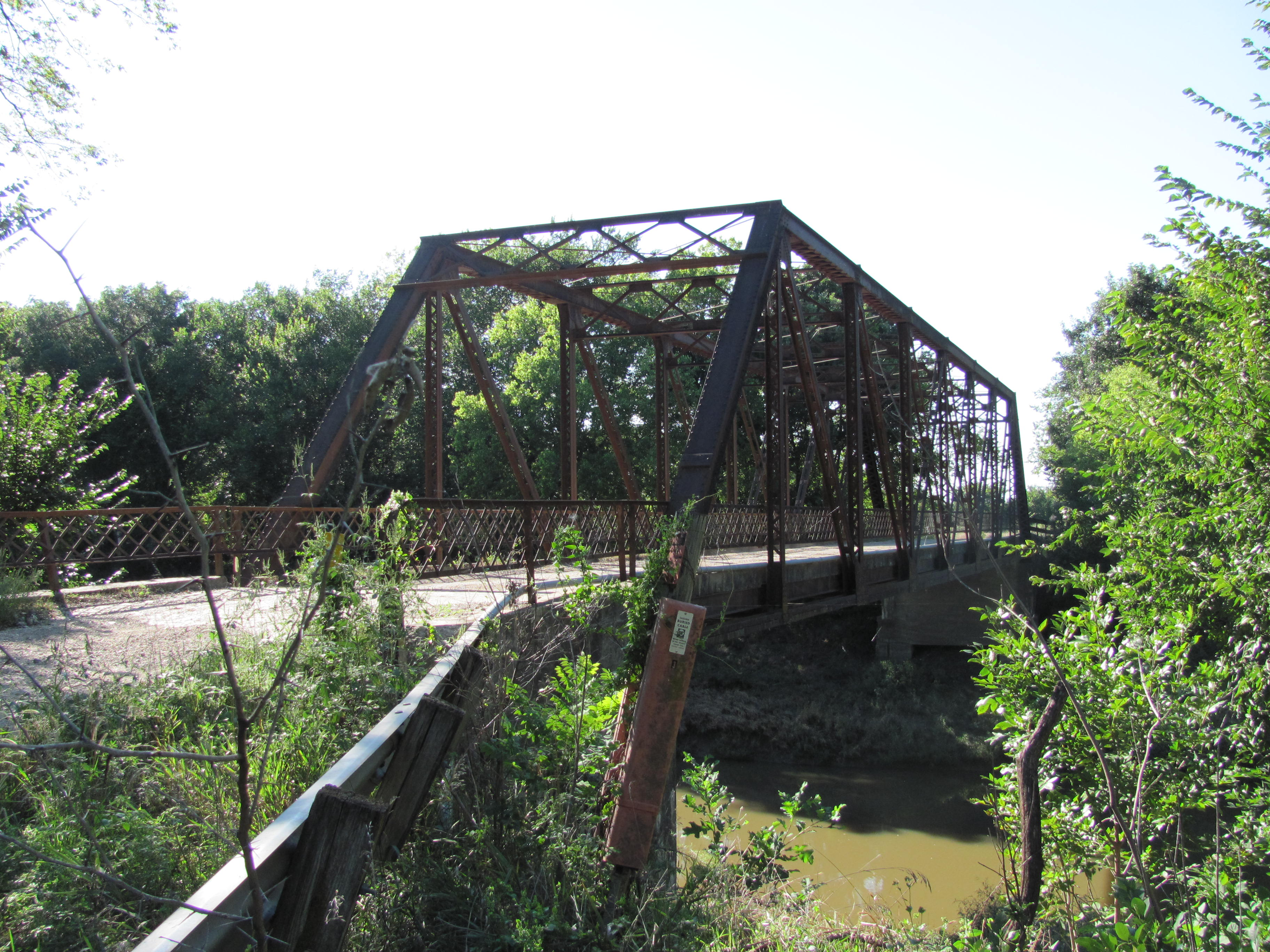
1916 Cottonwood River Pratt Truss Bridge west of Cedar Point (2012)

=== Transportation ===
U.S. Route 50 highway and BNSF Railway passes east–west near the city.

=== Utilities ===
- Internet
  - Satellite is provided by HughesNet, StarBand, WildBlue.
- TV
  - Satellite is provided by DirecTV, Dish Network.
  - Terrestrial is provided by regional digital TV stations.
- Electricity
  - Rural is provided by Butler REC.
- Trash is provided by City of Florence.

== See also ==
- Cedar Township, Chase County, Kansas
- Fort Drinkwater
- National Register of Historic Places listings in Chase County, Kansas
  - 1875 Cedar Point Mill (Drinkwater & Schriver Mill)
  - 1916 Cottonwood River Pratt Truss Bridge
- Cottonwood River and Great Flood of 1951
- April 1956 tornado outbreak
