= Judge Jacobs =

Judge Jacobs may refer to:

- Andrew Jacobs Sr. (1906–1992), judge of the Marion County Criminal Court
- Dennis Jacobs (born 1944), judge of the United States Court of Appeals for the Second Circuit
- Fred Clinton Jacobs (1865–1958), judge of the United States District Court for the District of Arizona
- Julian Jacobs (1937-2025), judge of the United States Tax Court
- Orange Jacobs (1827–1914), judge of the superior court of King County 1896–1900

== See also ==
- Justice Jacobs (disambiguation)
- Carol Thomas-Jacobs (born 1968/1969), judge on the United States Virgin Islands Superior Court
- Robin Jacob (born 1941), judge in the Court of Appeal of England and Wales
