= Jacobs River =

Jacobs River may refer to:

== Waterways ==
- Jacobs River (New South Wales), a tributary of the Snowy River located in the Australian Alps
- Jacobs River (New Zealand), a river in the West Coast region of the South Island of New Zealand
- Jacobs River, an early name for the Aparima River in New Zealand

== Communities ==
- Jacobs River, New Zealand, a locality in the West Coast region of the South Island of New Zealand

== See also ==
- Jacobs (disambiguation)
