= J.S. Schroeder Building =

- U.S. National Register of Historic Places
- U.S. Historic district – Contributing property
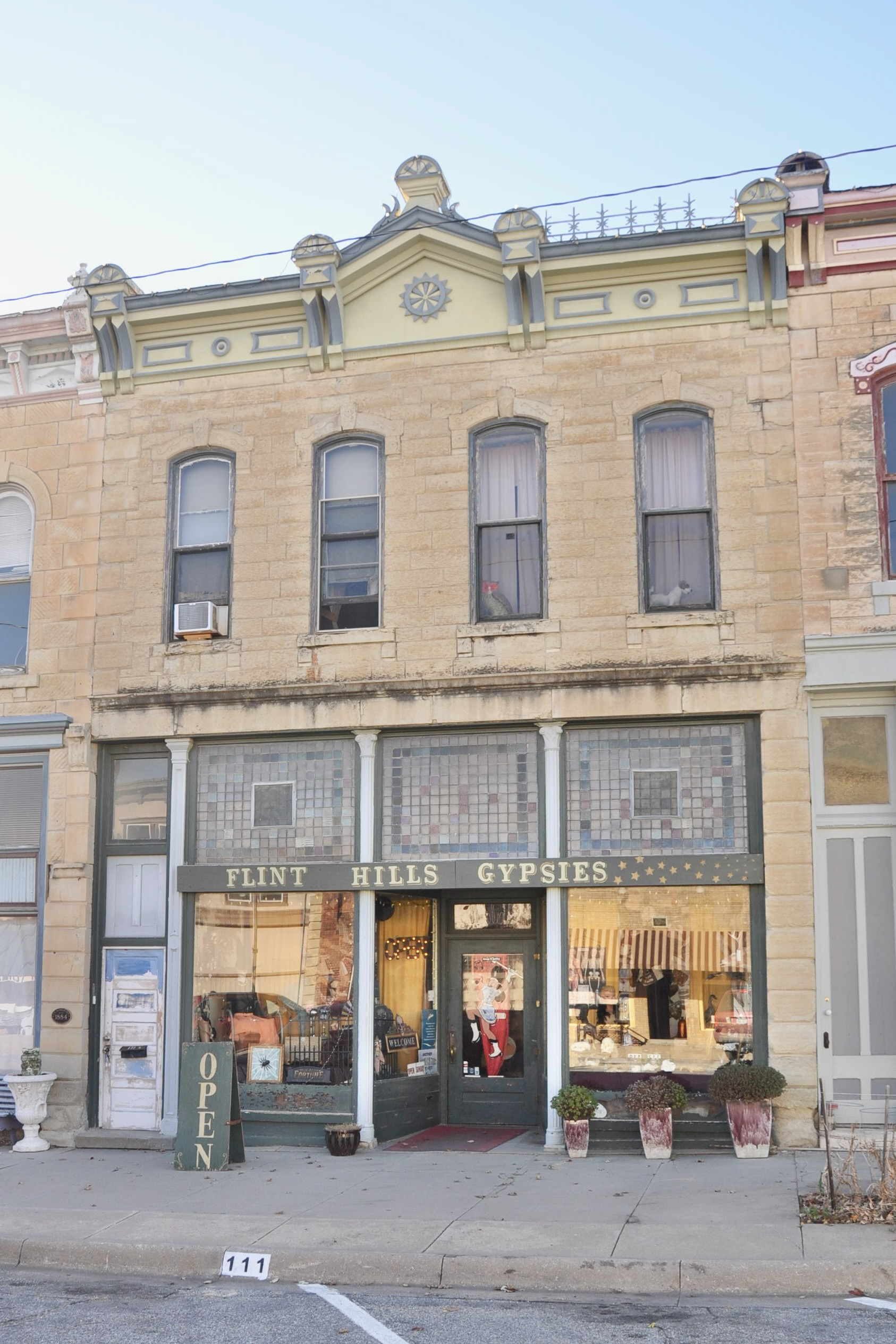

- Location within Kansas
- Location: 111 N Walnut Street; Peabody, Kansas
- Coordinates: 38°9′54″N 97°6′13″W
- Built: 1884
- Architectural style: Late Victorian: Italianate
- Restored: 1988
- Part of: Peabody Downtown Historic District (ID98000590)
- NRHP reference No.: 91001770
- Added to NRHP: December 6, 1991

J.S. Schroeder Building is a historic commercial building located at 111 North Walnut Street in the Downtown Historic District of Peabody, Kansas, United States. It was listed on the National Register of Historic Places (NRHP) on December 6, 1991.

It is a 25 by 102 feet (7.6 m × 31.1 m) building, with the front part two-story, built of limestone. The rear 52 feet (16 m) is a one-story cinder block addition.

== See also ==
- National Register of Historic Places listings in Marion County, Kansas
