= Peabody Historical Library Museum =

- Old Peabody Library
- U.S. National Register of Historic Places
- U.S. Historic district – Contributing property
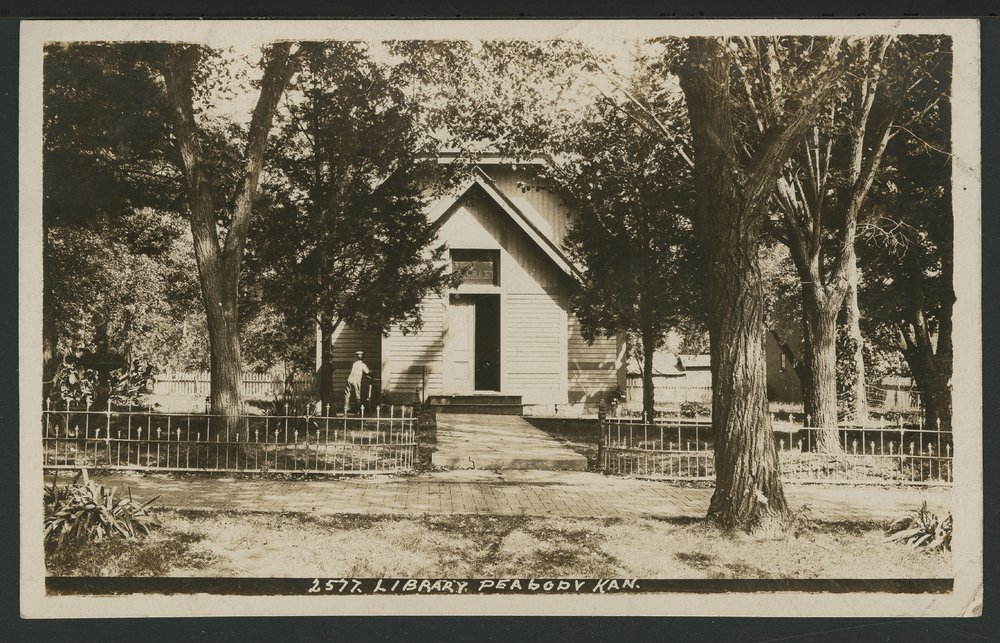
- Library in 1908

- Location within Kansas
- Location: 106 E Division Ave; Peabody, Kansas, 66866
- Coordinates: 38°10′2″N 97°6′22″W
- Built: 1875
- Architectural style: Vernacular
- Restored: 1927 and 1960
- Part of: Peabody Downtown Historic District (ID98000590)
- NRHP reference No.: 73000765
- Added to NRHP: July 2, 1973

Peabody Historical Library Museum, also known under the older name of Old Peabody Library, was listed on the National Register of Historic Places (NRHP) in 1973. It is located in the Downtown Historic District of Peabody, Kansas. The building has state significance because it was the first free tax-supported library in Kansas.

== History ==
=== Library ===
The city of Peabody was named in 1871 after F.H. Peabody, of Boston, formerly vice-president of the Atchison, Topeka and Santa Fe Railway company. (Note: Kansas : A Cyclopedia of State History, Embracing Events, Institutions, Industries, Counties, Cities, Towns, Prominent Persons, Etc; 3 Volumes; Frank W. Blackmar; Standard Publishing Co; 944 pages; 1912. (54MB PDF) (Volume2, 955 pages, 53MB PDF), (Volume3, 824 pages, 33MB PDF)) (Note: Atchison, Topeka, and Santa Fe Railway : Annual Meetings, and Directors and Officers : Volumes 7; AT&SF Railway; 1902. (12MB PDF)) In May 1874, Mr. Peabody visited the new city, at which time he announced he would donate money for a library building, furniture, books, periodicals and landscaping if the Peabody township would secure four lots for the site. The contract for construction was awarded in early 1875, and the library was opened to the public in June; in February 1876 the state legislature authorized the township to levy a tax to support the library. The structure housed the library facilities until 1914. (Note: History of the State of Kansas; William G. Cutler; A.T. Andreas Publisher; 1883.)

=== Moved ===
In 1914, the library was moved, and the Peabody Township Carnegie Library was constructed on the original location. The building was initially moved to the Peabody City Park, then later it was moved to south of the old Peabody Grade School near the railroad tracks. It was restored in 1927. The building was used for club meetings and stood idle for a number of years.

=== Museum ===
In 1960, while planning for the 1961 Kansas centennial celebration, local citizens organized to move the structure to a lot near its original location (east of the Carnegie library). The old library building was converted and dedicated as a museum on July 3, 1961.

Hours

As of 2011, it is open from Memorial Day to Labor Day on the 1st and 3rd Saturday of each month and each federal holiday (Memorial Day, Independence Day, Labor Day). The hours are 1 pm to 3 pm on each of these days.

== Gallery ==
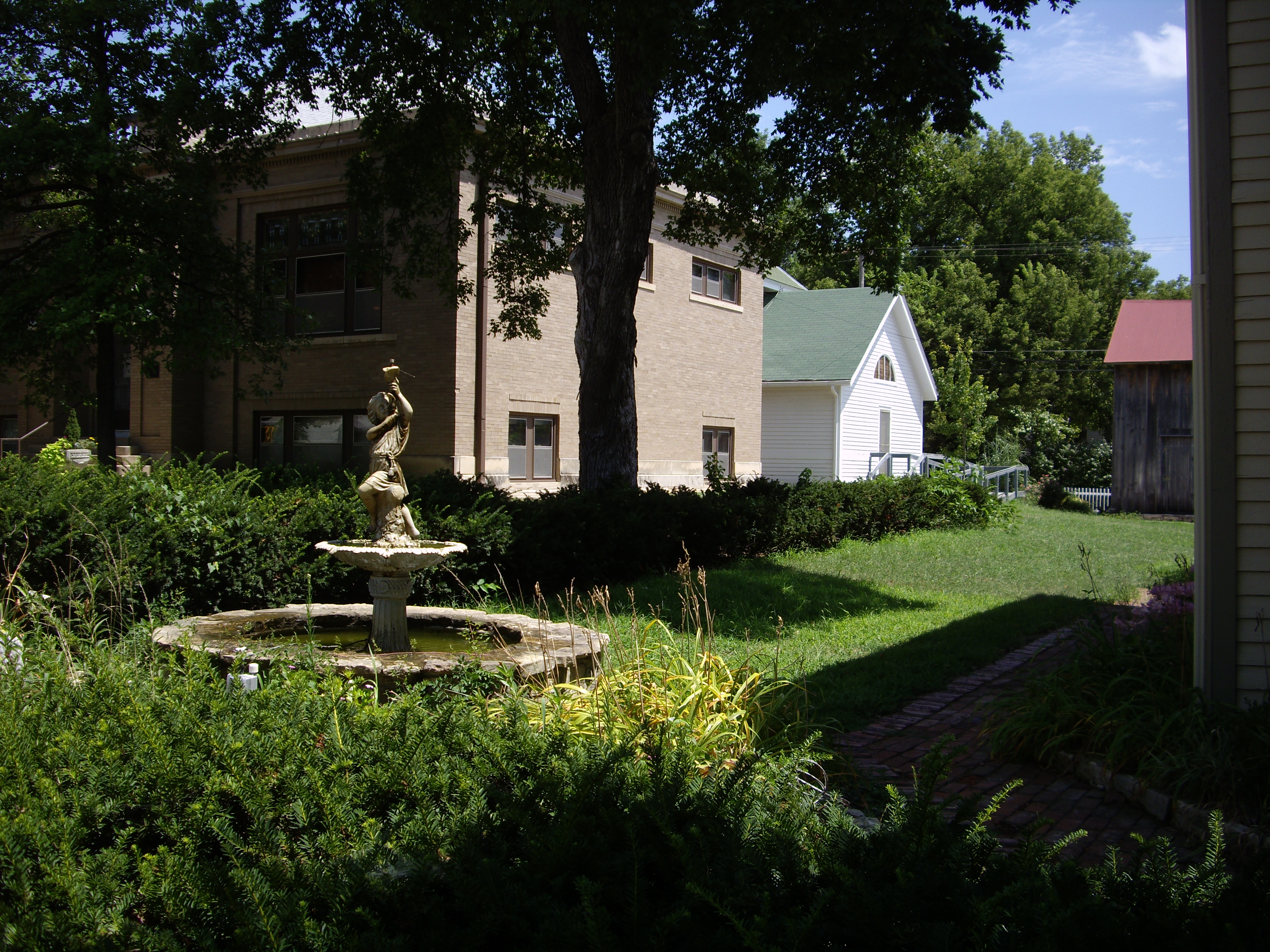
Fountain next to W.H. Morgan House (immediate right), W.H. Morgan Barn (back right with red roof), Carnegie Library (left with brown brick), Museum (back middle with green roof). Looking north-east in 2010.

== See also ==
- List of museums in Kansas
- National Register of Historic Places listings in Marion County, Kansas
- Peabody Downtown Historic District
- Peabody Township Library
- W.H. Morgan House
