= Fred Brickell =

American baseball player (1906–1961)

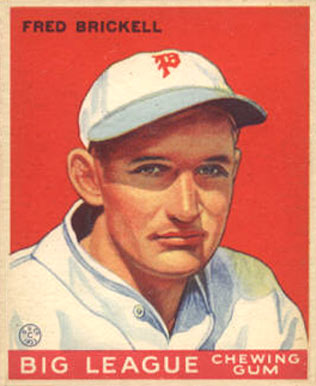
- Outfielder
- Born: November 9, 1906; Saffordville, Kansas, U.S.
- Died: April 8, 1961 (aged 54); Wichita, Kansas, U.S.
- Batted: Left Threw: Right

MLB debut
- August 19, 1926, for the Pittsburgh Pirates

Last MLB appearance
- May 1, 1933, for the Philadelphia Phillies

MLB statistics
- Batting average: .281
- Home runs: 6
- Runs batted in: 131
- Stats at Baseball Reference

Teams
- Pittsburgh Pirates (1926–1930); Philadelphia Phillies (1930–1933)

George Frederick Brickell (November 9, 1906 – April 8, 1961) was an American professional baseball outfielder. He played in Major League Baseball (MLB) for eight seasons with the Pittsburgh Pirates and Philadelphia Phillies.

Brickell started his professional baseball career in 1926, at the age of 19. That season, he hit .345 for the Wichita Izzies of the Western League. He made his major league debut with the Pirates in August and also hit .345 for them down the stretch.

Over the next several years, Brickell played semi-regularly for the Pirates and Phillies. His hitting declined, however. In 1933, he went back to the minor leagues. He retired in 1936.

In 501 games over eight seasons, Brickell posted a .281 batting average (407-for-1148) with 221 runs, 54 doubles, 23 triples, 6 home runs, 131 RBI, 106 bases on balls, .335 on-base percentage and .363 slugging percentage. He finished his career with a .967 fielding percentage playing at all three outfield positions.

Brickell was elected into the Kansas Baseball Hall of Fame in 1951. His son, Fritz Brickell, a shortstop, played in parts of three big-league seasons between 1958 and 1961.

Brickell died of a heart attack in 1961.
