= Drinkwater & Schriver Mill =

- U.S. National Register of Historic Places
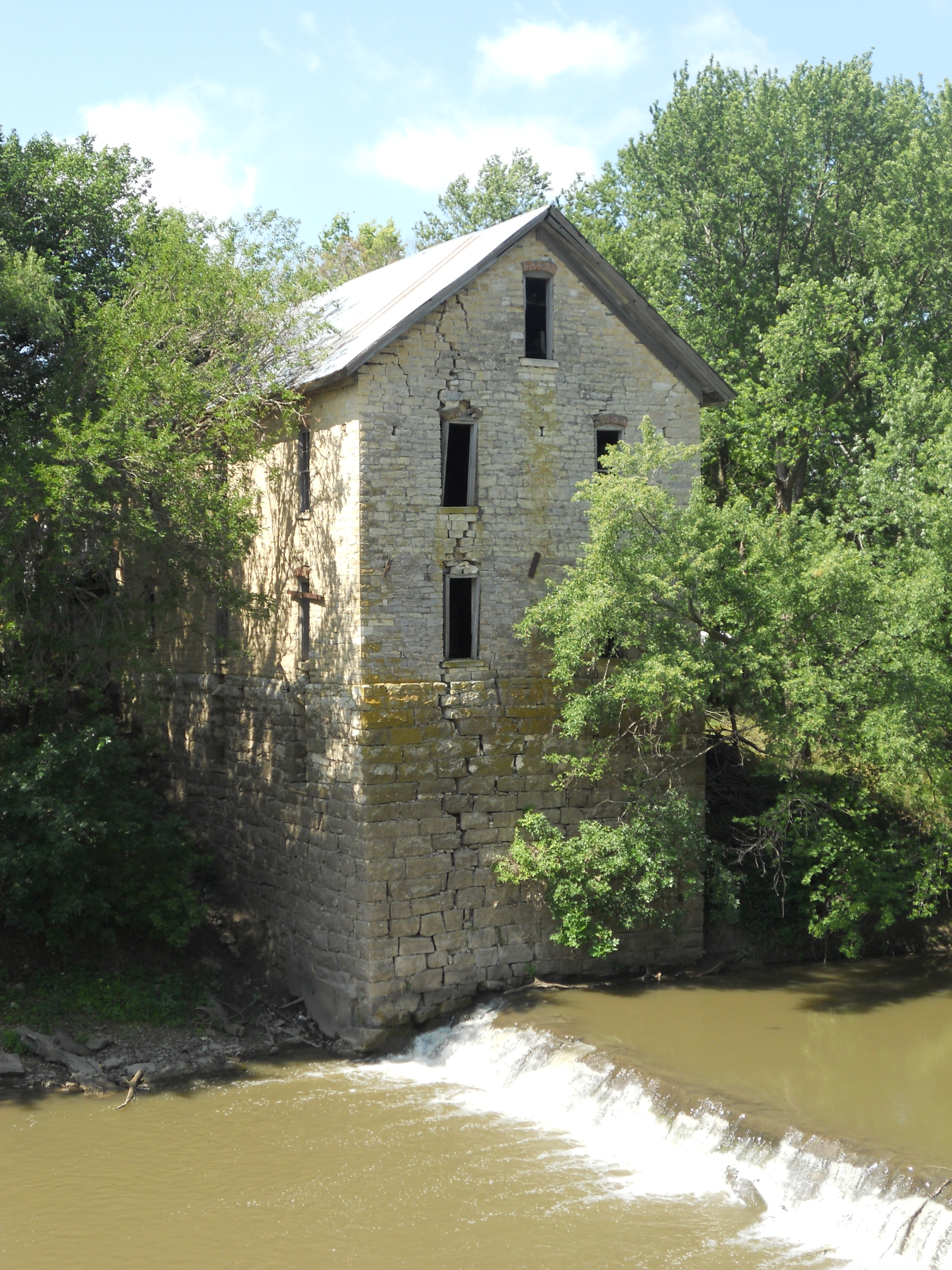
- North side of mill next to Cottonwood River (2012)

- Location within Kansas
- Location: First St & Main St; Cedar Point, Kansas 66843 USA
- Coordinates: 38°15′42″N 96°49′10″W
- Built: 1875
- NRHP reference No.: 06001166
- Added to NRHP: December 20, 2006

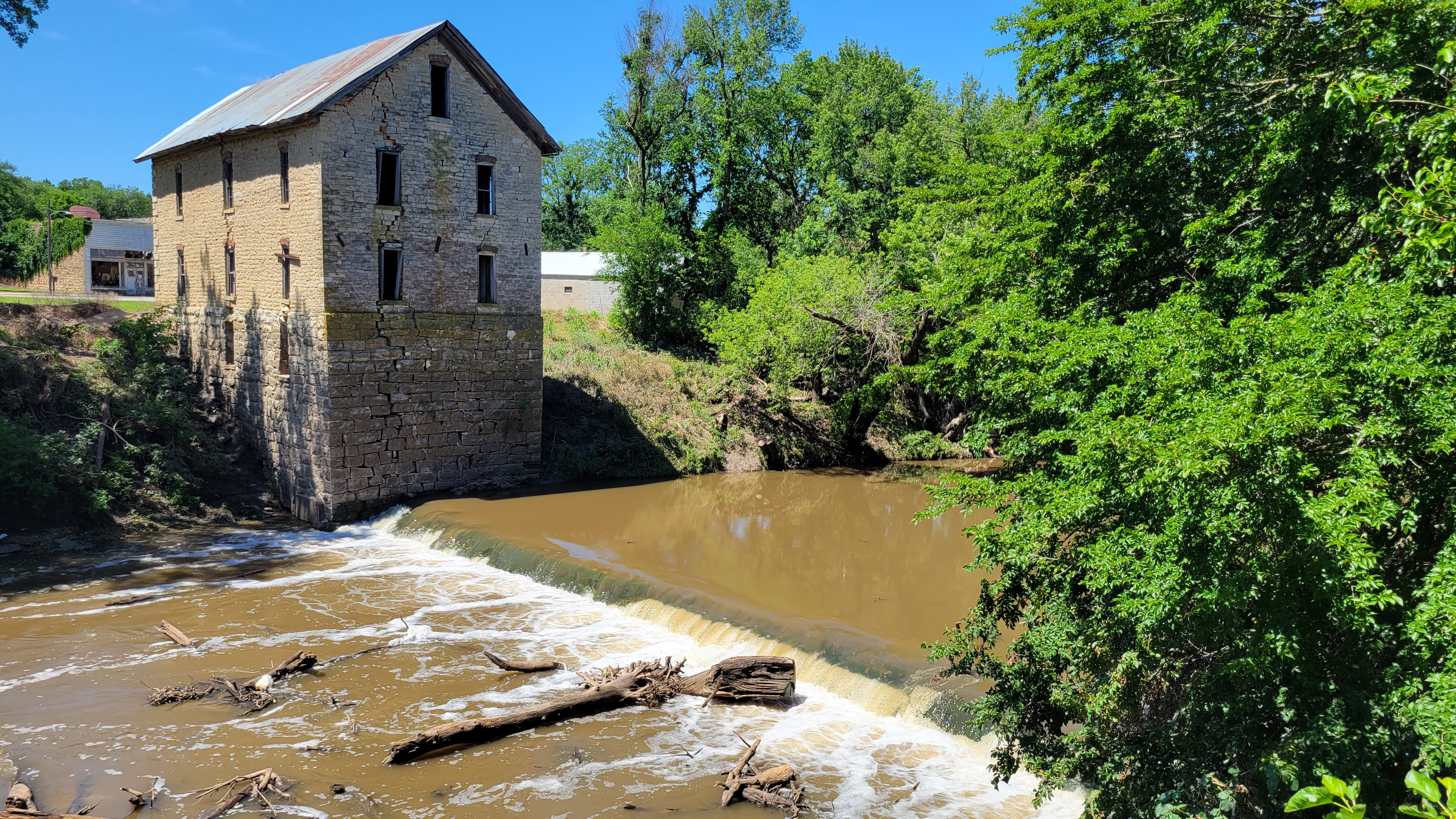
Mill in 2024

Drinkwater & Schriver Mill, also known as Cedar Point Mill, was listed on the National Register of Historic Places (NRHP) in 2006. It is located in Cedar Point, Kansas, United States, in the heart of the Flint Hills.

== History ==
In 1867, a log dam was built across the Cottonwood River, and a wooden-frame mill was constructed for sawing lumber. The following year (1868) it was converted to grind flour and named Cedar Point Mill.

In 1870, the name was changed to Drinkwater & Schriver Mill. In 1871, construction of the current stone structure was started. In 1875, the building was completed. It used stone burrs to grind corn and wheat into flour, with a capacity of 75 barrels per day. In 1884, the log dam was replaced by a stone dam.

== See also ==
- National Register of Historic Places listings in Chase County, Kansas
