= Peabody Downtown Historic District =

Historic district in Kansas, United States

- U.S. National Register of Historic Places
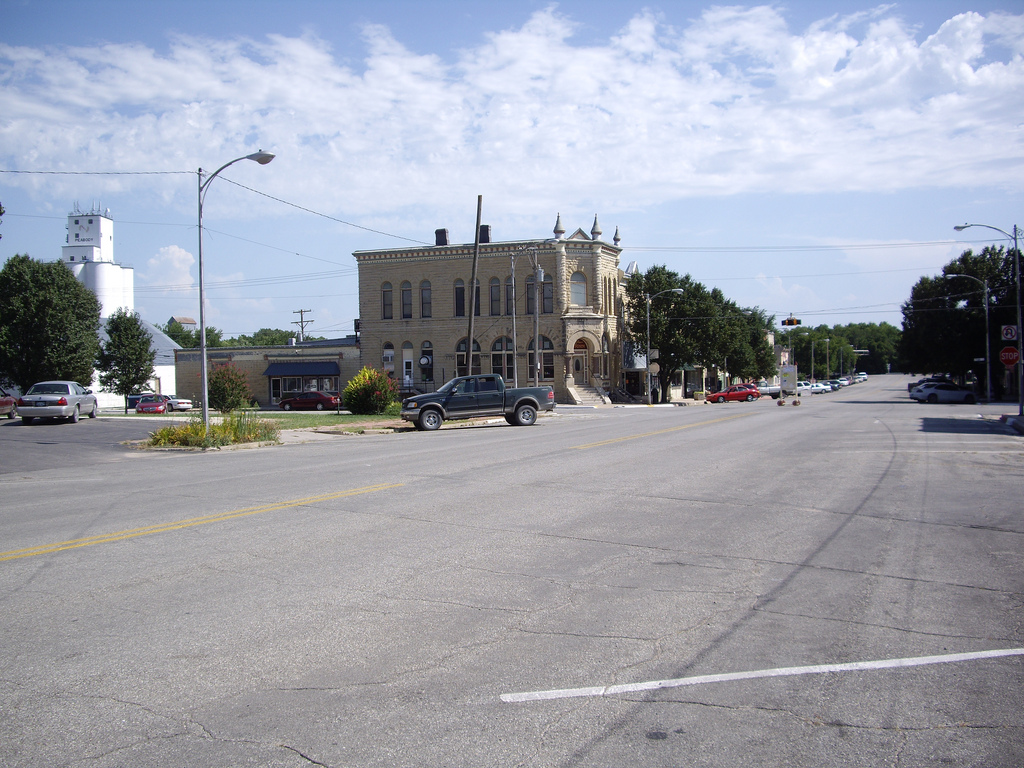
- Downtown Peabody (looking south), in 2010

- Location within Kansas Location within the United States
- Location: 100 to 300 N Walnut St; Peabody, Kansas, 66866
- Coordinates: 38°9′57″N 97°6′25″W
- Built: 1874 to 1922
- Architectural style: Late Victorian: Italianate, Queen Anne, Gothic, Romanesque
- NRHP reference No.: 98000590
- Added to NRHP: May 29, 1998

The Peabody Downtown Historic District is a historic district which was listed on the National Register of Historic Places (NRHP) in 1998. It is located in Peabody, Kansas.

Significant contributing buildings in the district include:

- City Building (1886)
- Old Peabody Library (separately NRHP-listed)
- Peabody Township Carnegie Library (separately NRHP-listed)
- Morgan House (1881) (separately NRHP-listed)
- Kansas State Bank Building (1887)

== Gallery ==
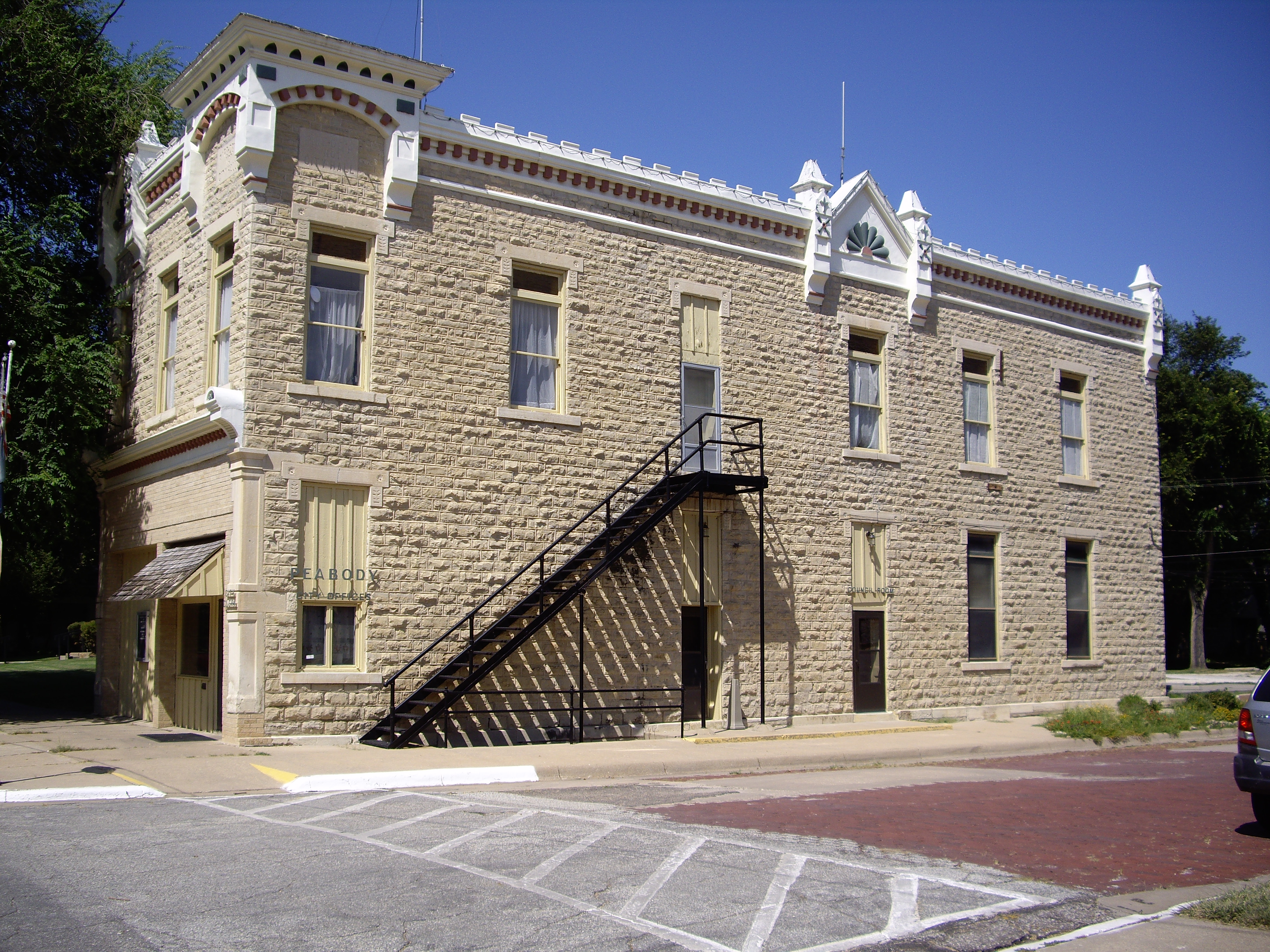
1886 Peabody City Hall.

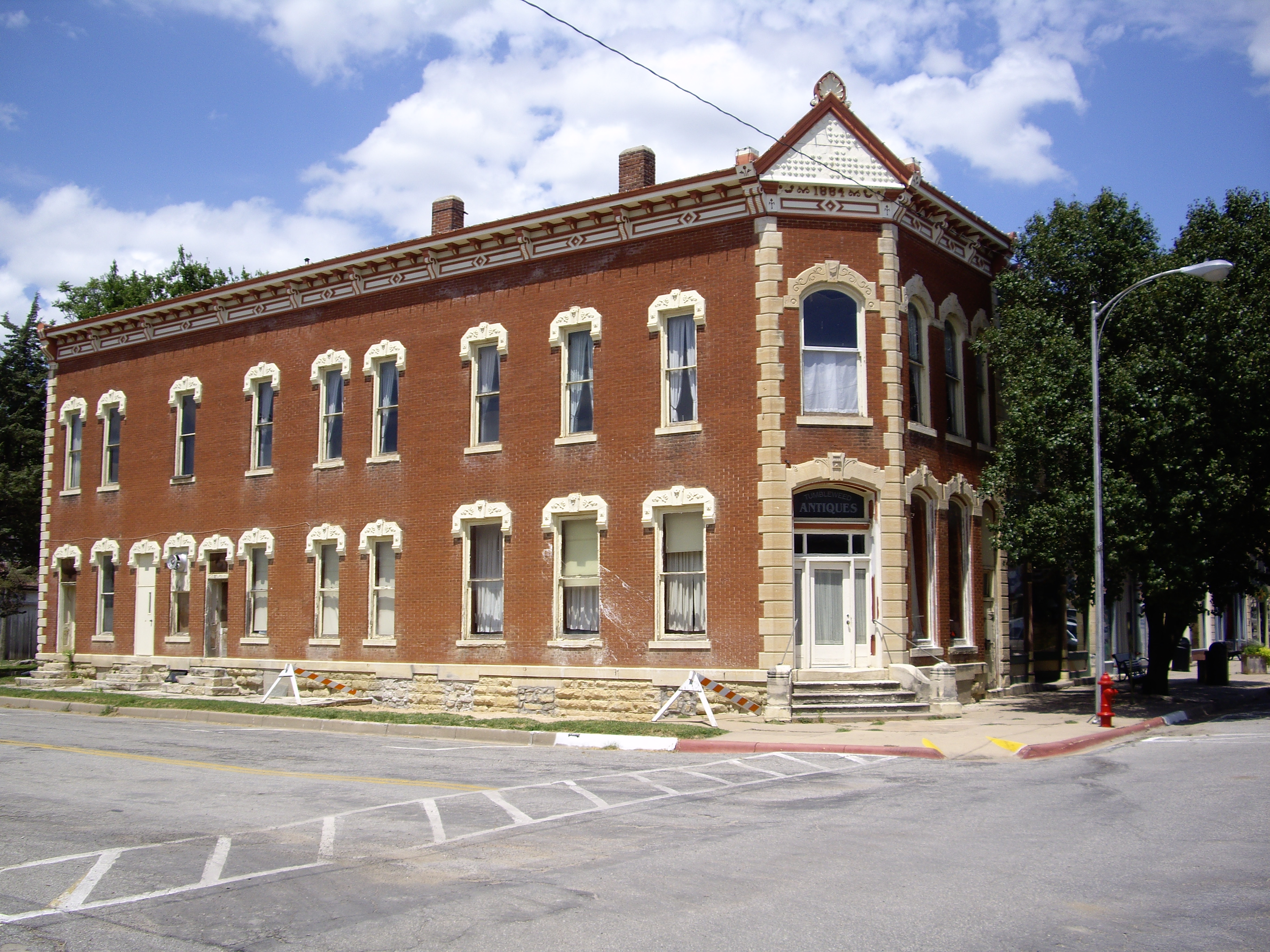
1884 Peabody Bank Building was a bank from 1884 to 1922. The current bank is 1 block north.

== See also ==
- National Register of Historic Places listings in Marion County, Kansas
  - Peabody Historical Library Museum
  - Peabody Township Library
  - W.H. Morgan House
  - J.S. Schroeder Building
- Sunflower Theater
- Charles W. Squires
