= Peabody Township Library =

- Peabody Township Carnegie Library
- U.S. National Register of Historic Places
- U.S. Historic district – Contributing property
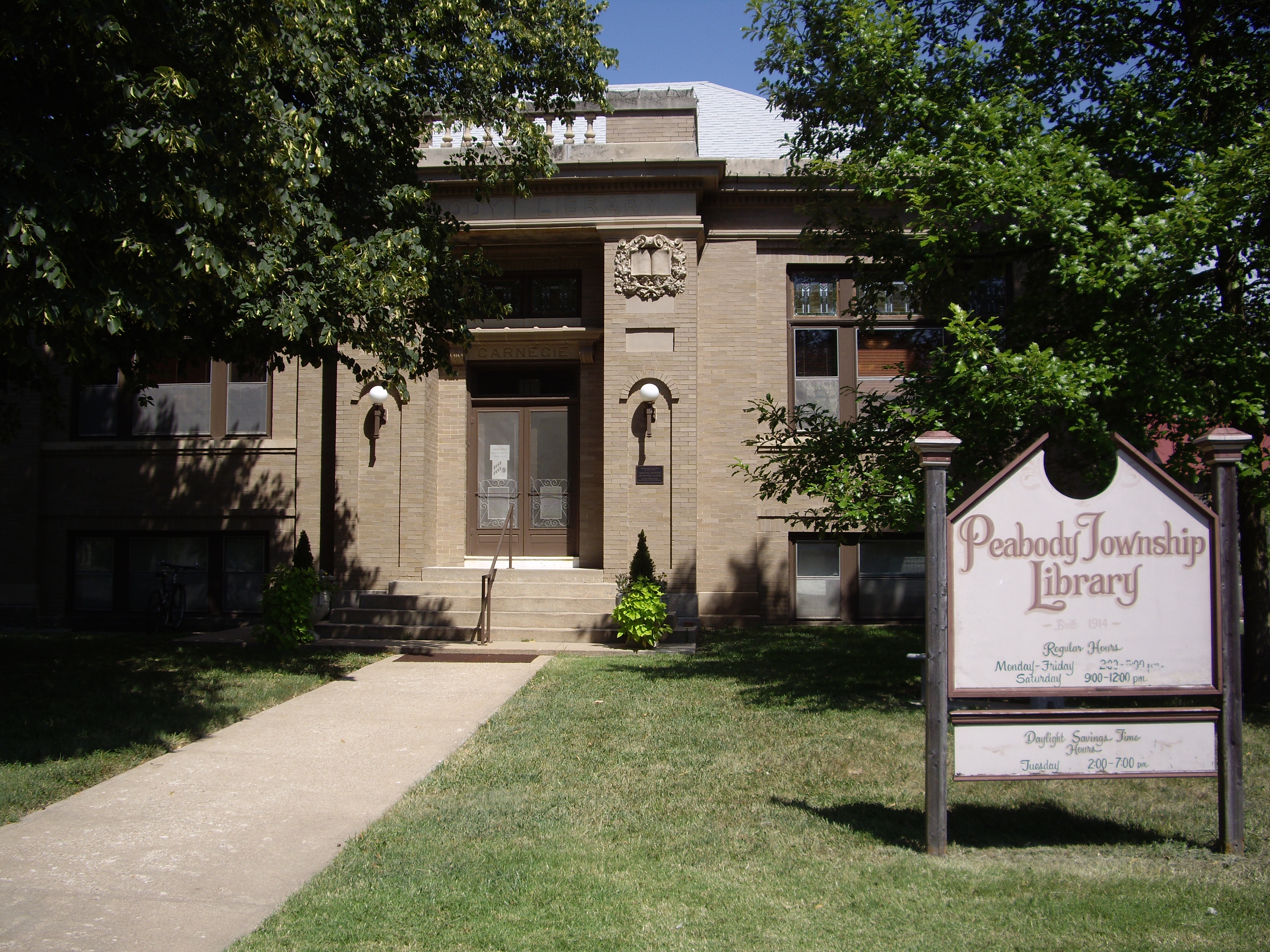
- Peabody Township Library, 2010

- Location within Kansas
- Location: 214 N Walnut Street; Peabody, Kansas, 66866
- Coordinates: 38°10′2″N 97°6′24″W
- Built: 1914
- Built by: M.R. Stauffer (supervisor)
- Architect: A.A. Crowell
- Architectural style: Neo-Classical
- Part of: Peabody Downtown Historic District (ID98000590)
- NRHP reference No.: 87000959
- Added to NRHP: June 25, 1987

Peabody Township Library, formerly Peabody Township Carnegie Library, is a library that was listed on the National Register of Historic Places (NRHP) in 1987. It is located in the Downtown Historic District of Peabody, Kansas, United States.

== History ==
In 1875, the original library was constructed. The library was useful but within a few decades of use had become too small.

A committee of the Commercial Club, applied for a Carnegie library grant, and by the spring of 1913, the Carnegie Corporation had agreed to a grant of $10,000. The building plan agreed upon will resemble that of the Carnegie library of Galena, Illinois. The original library building was moved to the Peabody City Park, and the new Carnegie library was built on its site. On April 18, 1914, the doors were open to the public.

Later, the original library was moved again and became the Peabody Historical Library Museum.

Since 2008, two computers have been available for high-speed T1 internet access, and free WiFi access allow patrons to browse the internet. The library is a member of the North Central Kansas Libraries System, which provides an inter-library book loan service between its members.

== Gallery ==
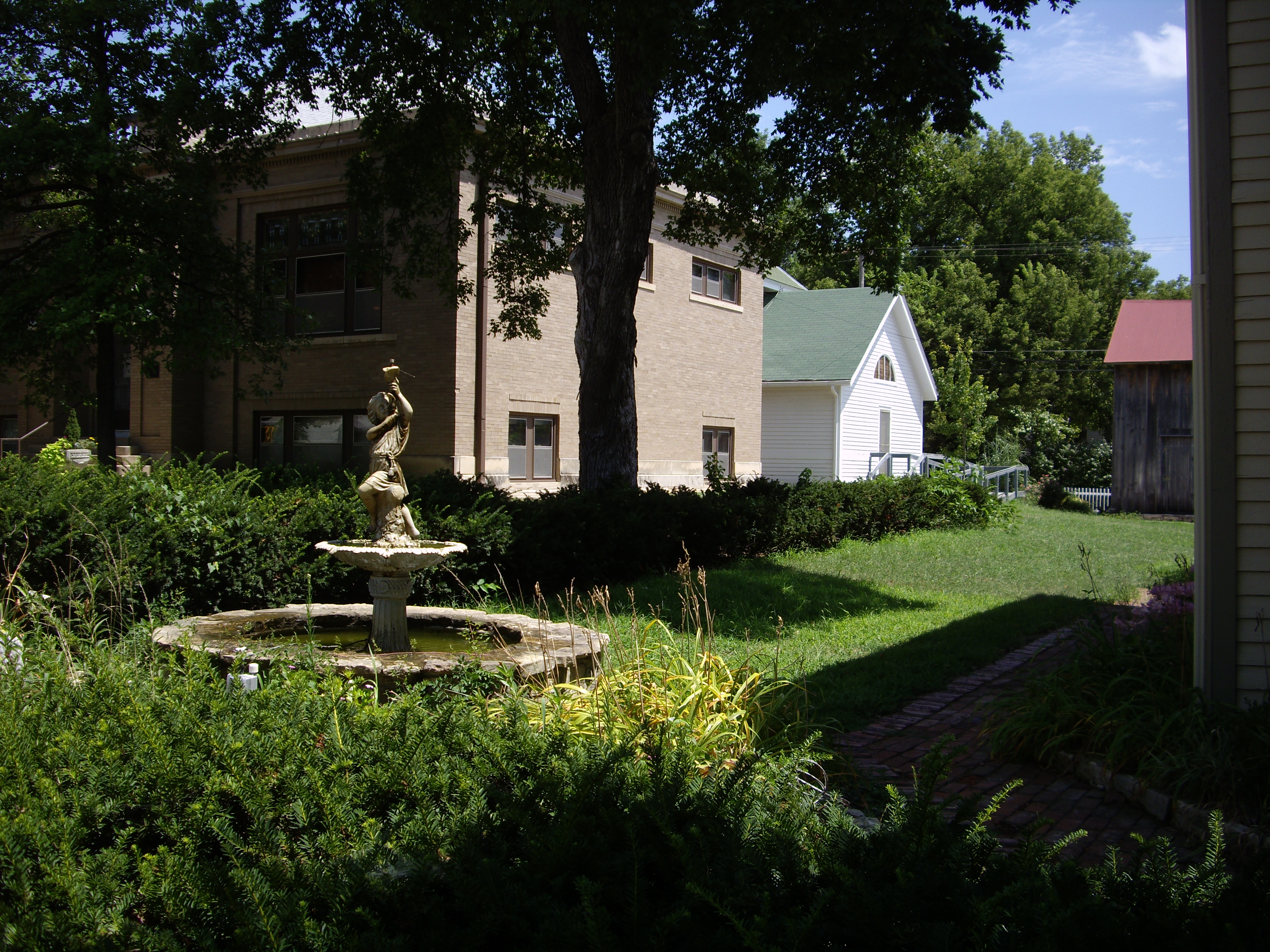
Fountain next to W.H. Morgan House (immediate right), W.H. Morgan Barn (back right with red roof), Carnegie Library (left with brown brick), Museum (back middle with green roof). Looking north-east in 2010.

== See also ==
- List of Carnegie libraries in Kansas
- National Register of Historic Places listings in Marion County, Kansas
- Peabody Downtown Historic District
- Peabody Historical Library Museum
