= Jacobs Creek (Monongahela River tributary) =

Stream in Pennsylvania, USA

Jacobs Creek Tributary to Monongahela River
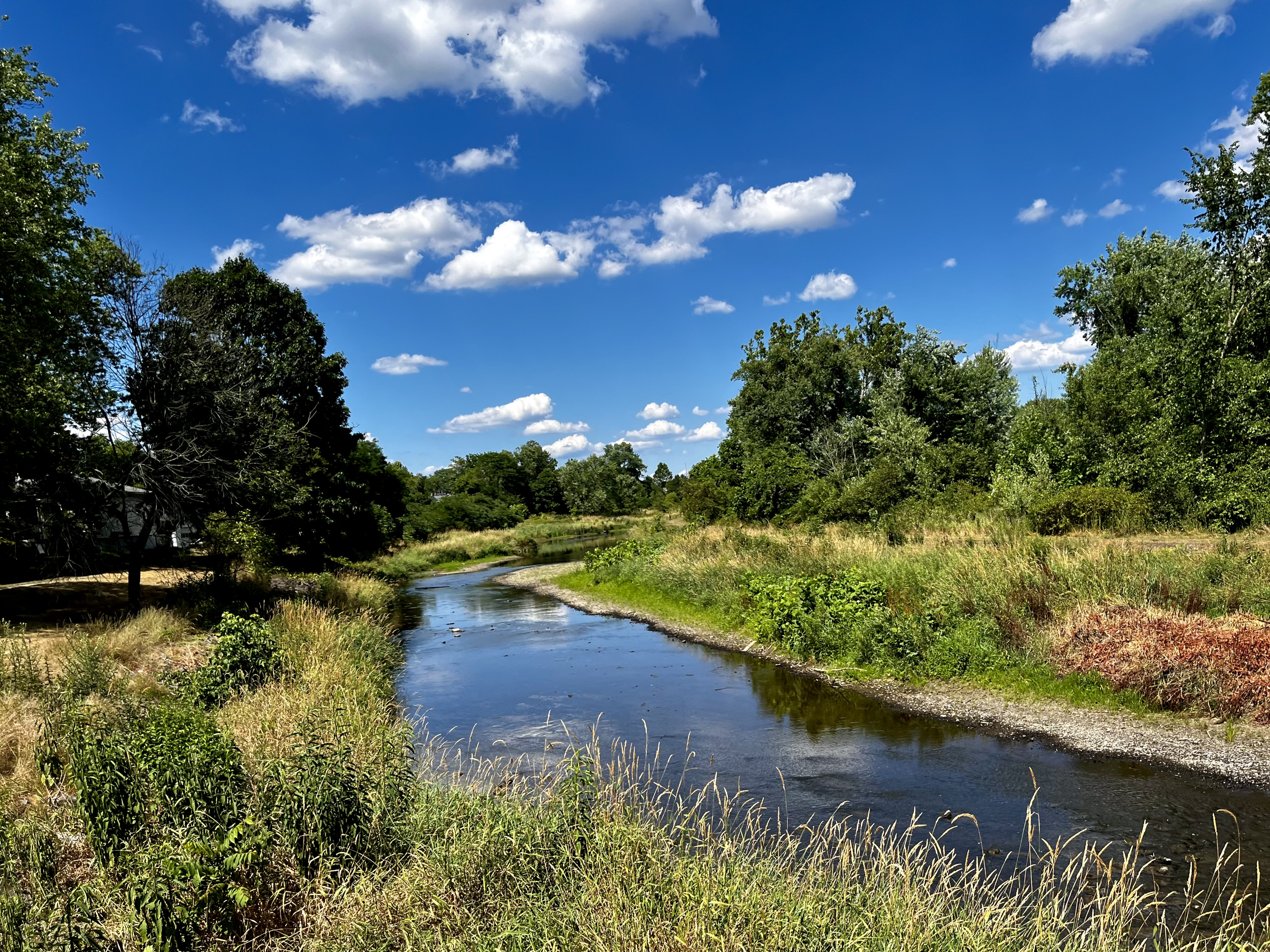
- Jacob’s Creek as seen from Scottdale, Pennsylvania in 2024

- Location of Jacobs Creek mouth Jacobs Creek (Monongahela River tributary) (the United States)

Location
- Country: United States
- State: Pennsylvania
- County: Fayette

Physical characteristics
- Source: South Branch Browns Run divide
  - location: about 1.5 miles northwest of Shoaf, Pennsylvania
  - coordinates: 39°50′51″N 079°50′01″W
  - elevation: 1,240 ft (380 m)
- Mouth: Monongahela River
  - location: Martin, Pennsylvania
  - coordinates: 39°48′29″N 079°54′55″W
  - elevation: 763 ft (233 m)
- Length: 5.62 mi (9.04 km)
- Basin size: 7.54 square miles (19.5 km^{2})
- Discharge
  - location: Monongahela River
  - average: 10.06 cu ft/s (0.285 m^{3}/s) at mouth with Monongahela River

Basin features
- Progression: southwest
- River system: Monongahela River
- Tributaries
  - left: unnamed tributaries
  - right: unnamed tributaries
- Bridges: Yasenoskowski Road, Smithfield Avenue, SR 3008, T364, Fairview Hill Road, Potprocky Ashby Ford Road, PA 166

Jacobs Creek is a 5.62 mi (9.04 km) long 2nd order tributary to the Monongahela River in Fayette County, Pennsylvania.

== Course ==
Jacobs Creek rises about 1.5 miles northwest of Shoaf, Pennsylvania, and then flows southwest to join the Monongahela River at Martin.

== Watershed ==
Jacobs Creek drains 7.54 square miles (19.5 km^{2}) of area, receives about 42.9 in/year of precipitation, has a wetness index of 340.19, and is about 58% forested.

== See also ==
- List of rivers of Pennsylvania
