= Jacobs Creek (Kansas) =

River in Kansas, U.S.

Coordinates: 38°16′20″N 95°52′01″W

Jacobs Creek is a tributary of the Cottonwood River in the Flint Hills of south central Kansas in the United States.

The headwaters are just south of the Kansas Turnpike and the mouth is at its confluence with the Cottonwood River between Emporia and Saffordville in Kansas. The terrain of the watershed is hilly and used primarily as rangeland. The drainage area upstream of the Kansas Turnpike is only about a few square miles. Jacobs Creek crosses the slightly elevated embankment of the turnpike through culverts.

The Jacobs Creek Flood occurred in 2003.

== See also ==
- List of rivers of Kansas
