= Cedar Creek (Chase County, Kansas) =

Stream in Chase County, Kansas, U.S.

Coordinates: 38°15′39″N 96°47′35″W

Cedar Creek, also called Brush Creek, is a stream in Chase County, Kansas. It is a tributary to the Cottonwood River.

A tributary of the stream is Coon Creek, which is 11 miles (18 km) long. The Cedar Creek's headwaters include three streams, the Cedar Creek, Bill's Creek, and Middle Creek. Cedar Creek (27 miles (43 km)) and the south fork of the Cottonwood River flow into the Cottonwood River, which is a tributary of the Neosho River. Minnows, crayfish, and spotted bass reside in the stream.

== See also ==
- List of rivers of Kansas
