= W.H. Morgan House =

Historic house in Peabody, Kansas, United States

- U.S. National Register of Historic Places
- U.S. Historic district – Contributing property
- Location within Kansas
- Location: 212 N Walnut Street; Peabody, Kansas, 66866
- Coordinates: 38°10′1″N 97°6′23″W
- Built: 1881
- Built by: A.K. Stewart
- Architectural style: Late Victorian: Italianate
- Restored: 1992
- Part of: Peabody Downtown Historic District (ID98000590)
- NRHP reference No.: 95001562
- Added to NRHP: January 22, 1996

W.H. Morgan House was listed on the National Register of Historic Places (NRHP) in 1996. It is located in the Downtown Historic District of Peabody, Kansas.

It was built in about 1881. It is a two-story Italianate-style house with clapboard siding on a limestone block foundation, with a hipped roof.

== Gallery ==
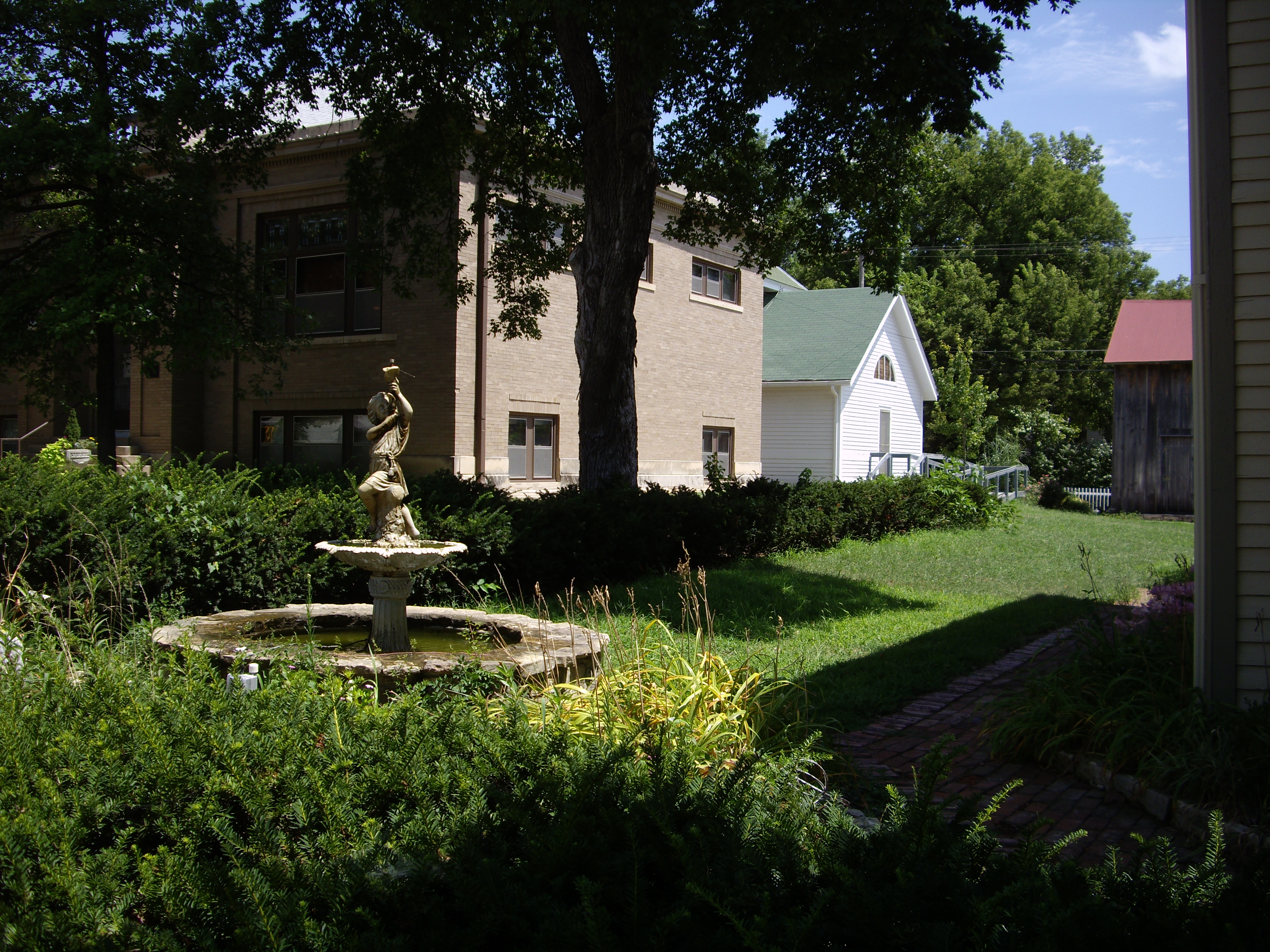
Fountain next to W.H. Morgan House (immediate right), W.H. Morgan Barn (back right with red roof), Carnegie Library (left with brown brick), Museum (back middle with green roof). Looking north-east in 2010.

== See also ==
- List of museums in Kansas
- National Register of Historic Places listings in Marion County, Kansas
- Peabody Downtown Historic District
- Peabody Historical Library Museum
