= Clements, Kansas =

Unincorporated community in Kansas, US

- Unincorporated community
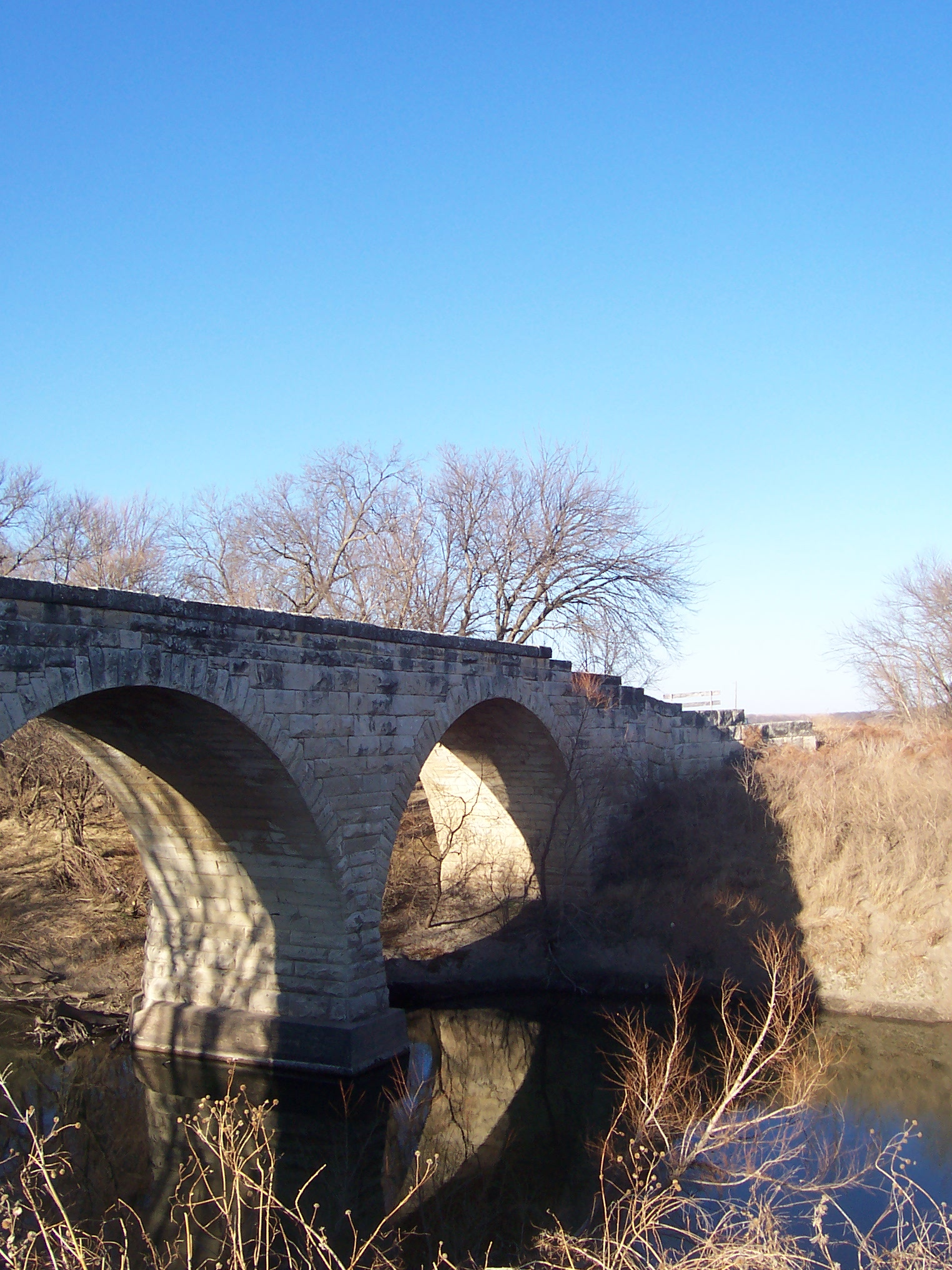
- 1886 Clements Stone Arch Bridge over Cottonwood River (2006)

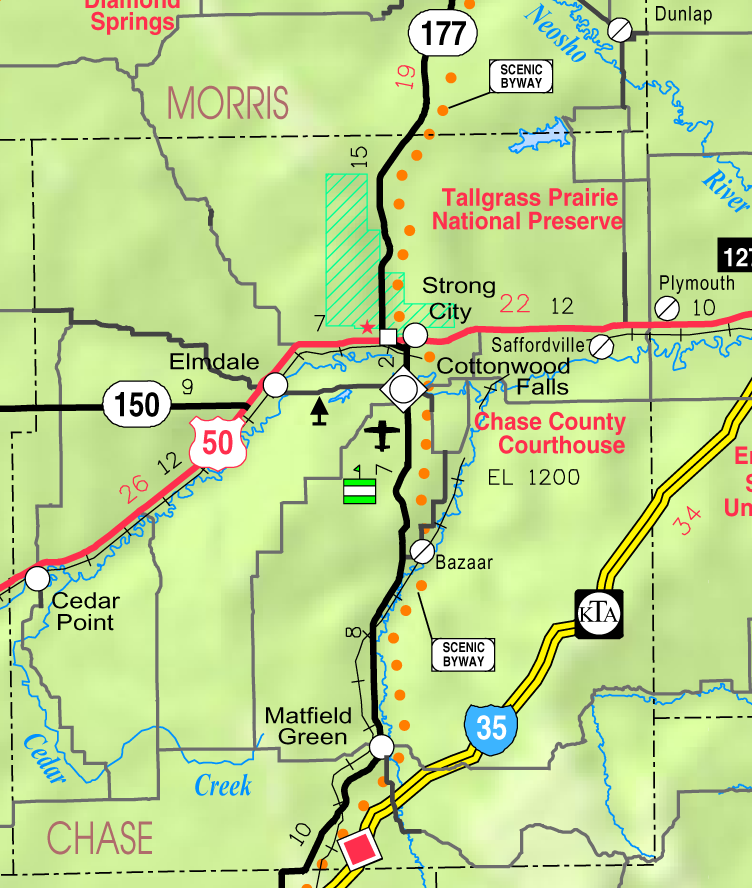
- KDOT map of Chase County (legend)

- Location within Kansas Location within the United States
- Coordinates: 38°18′00″N 96°44′27″W
- Country: United States
- State: Kansas
- County: Chase
- Township: Cottonwood
- Founded: 18?? (Crawfordsville); 1884 (Clements)
- Elevation: 1,227 ft (374 m)
- Time zone: UTC-6 (CST)
  - Summer (DST): UTC-5 (CDT)
- Area code: 620
- FIPS code: 20-14000
- GNIS ID: 477389

Clements is an unincorporated community in Chase County, Kansas, United States. It is located about halfway between Strong City and Florence near the intersection of U.S. Route 50 highway and G Rd.

== History ==
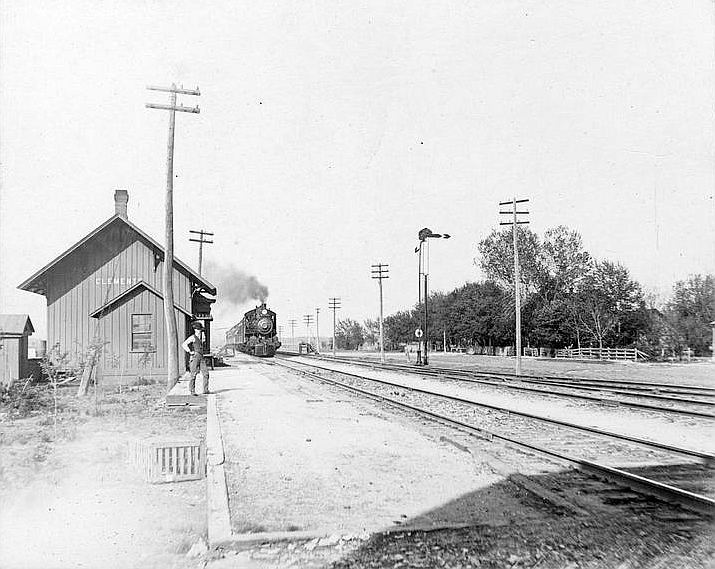
Atchison, Topeka and Santa Fe Railway depot in Clements, circa 1880-1900

In 1862, a post office opened in nearby Silver Creek (an extinct town).

In 1871, the Atchison, Topeka and Santa Fe Railway built a main line east–west through the community. In 1996, it merged with Burlington Northern Railroad and renamed to the current BNSF Railway. Most locals still refer to this railroad as the "Santa Fe".

In 1881, the post office from Silver Creek was moved to the rail community of Crawfordsville, which was renamed in 1884 to Clements. The post office was discontinued in 1988.

In 1887, the nearby Clements Stone Arch Bridge was completed over the Cottonwood River.

There have been numerous floods during the history of Clements. In June and July 1951, due to heavy rains, rivers and streams flooded numerous cities in Kansas, including Clements. Many reservoirs and levees were built in Kansas as part of a response to the Great Flood of 1951.

== Geography ==
Clements is located in the Flint Hills of the Great Plains. The Cottonwood River runs through the southern part of the community.

== Arts and culture ==
Clements has one listing on the National Register of Historic Places listings in Chase County, Kansas (NRHP). The Clements Stone Arch Bridge was built of native limestone across Cottonwood River in 1887. The two-span bridge with a main span of 57.1 ft (17.4 m) and a length of 126.9 ft (38.7 m) is now open only to pedestrians.

== Education ==
The community is served by Chase County USD 284 public school district. It has two schools.

== Infrastructure ==
U.S. Route 50 highway and the La Junta Subdivision branch of BNSF Railway pass through Clements.
