= Jacobs Creek (Missouri) =

Stream in the US state of Missouri

Jacobs Creek is a stream in northeast St. Francois County in the U.S. state of Missouri. It is a tributary of Hazel Run.

The stream headwaters arise along the south side of a mountain bearing the French Village fire lookout tower at an elevation of about 940 feet. The community of French Village is about two miles to the east on Missouri Route Y. The stream flows to the southwest for about three miles to its confluence with Hazel Run just northwest of the community of Hazel Run at an elevation of 738 feet.

The source area is at 37°58′39″N 90°25′27″W and the confluence is at 37°57′13″N 90°27′57″W.

Jacobs Creek has the name of Jacob Mostiller, the original owner of the site.

== See also ==
- List of rivers of Missouri
