= Saffordville, Kansas =

Unincorporated community in Chase County, Kansas

- Unincorporated community
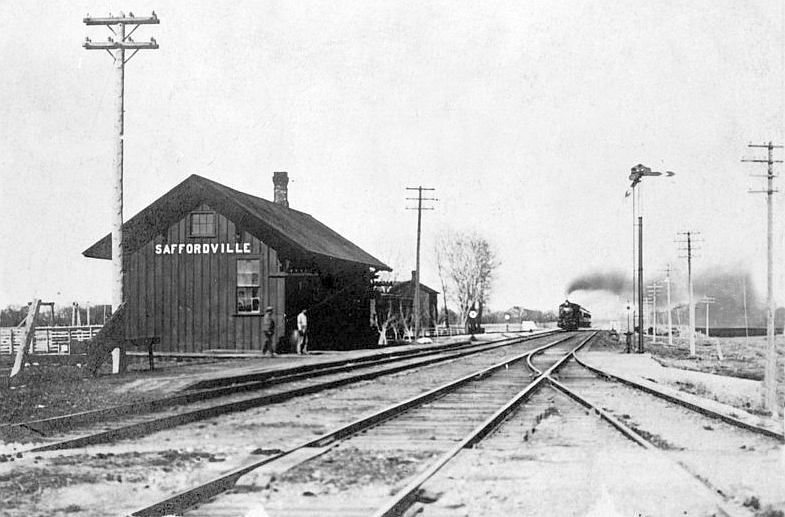
- Atchison, Topeka and Santa Fe Railway depot in Saffordville, circa 1890-1900

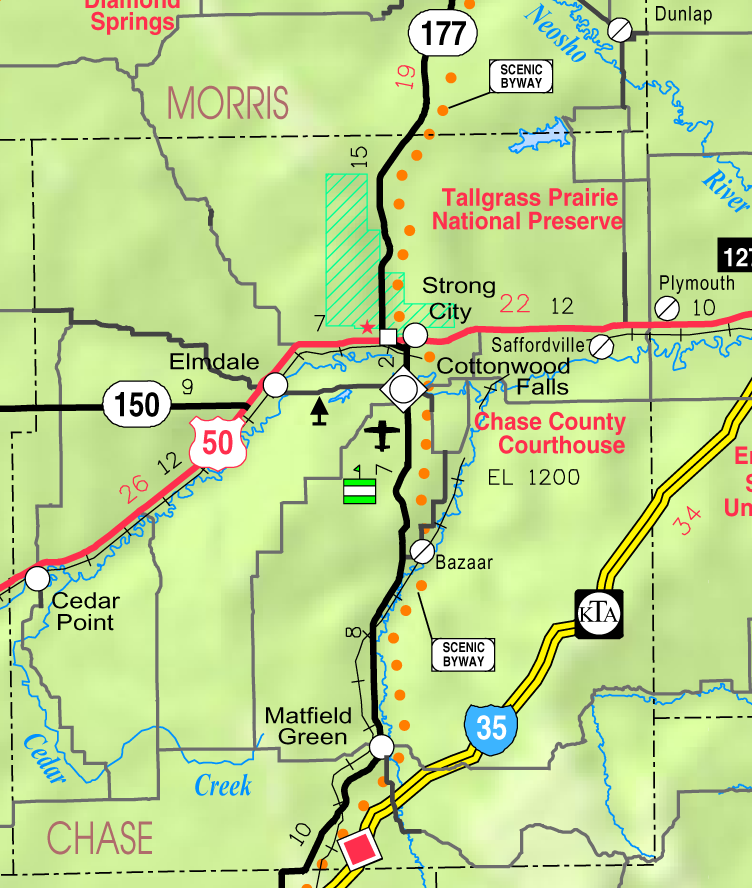
- KDOT map of Chase County (legend)

- Location within Kansas Location within the United States
- Coordinates: 38°24′0″N 96°23′34″W
- Country: United States
- State: Kansas
- County: Chase
- Elevation: 1,148 ft (350 m)
- Time zone: UTC-6 (CST)
  - Summer (DST): UTC-5 (CDT)
- Area code: 620
- FIPS code: 20-62050
- GNIS ID: 477269

Saffordville is an unincorporated community in Chase County, Kansas, United States. It is located approximately halfway between Strong City and Emporia near the intersection of U.S. Route 50 highway and Zz Rd. BNSF Railway passes through the community.

== History ==
For millennia, the land now known as Kansas was inhabited by Native Americans. In 1803, most of modern Kansas was secured by the United States as part of the Louisiana Purchase. In 1854, the Kansas Territory was organized, then in 1861 Kansas became the 34th U.S. state. In 1859, Chase County was founded.

In 1871, the Atchison, Topeka and Santa Fe Railway built a main line east–west through Safford. In 1996, it merged with Burlington Northern Railroad and renamed to the current BNSF Railway. The Santa Fe depot building still exists, but has been closed for decades. Most locals still refer to this railroad as the "Santa Fe". By 1921, Saffordville boasted a population of 200. It possessed several businesses including a blacksmith shop, automobile garage, restaurant, and barbershop, along with a bank and grocery store.

A post office was established in Safford on December 31, 1872. The post office was renamed to Kenyon on October 27, 1887, then again to Saffordville on October 3, 1888. The post office closed on January 6, 1957.

Numerous floods occurred in Saffordville, beginning in 1904, then eight more times from 1923 to 1929. In June and July 1951, heavy rains flooded many rivers and streams in Kansas, including the Cottonwood River at Saffordville. Many reservoirs and levees were built in Kansas as part of a response to the Great Flood of 1951. As a result of the 1951 flood, the town of 200 people was submerged under five feet of water. Residents were evacuated, and, when the waters receded, most of them relocated to drier sections. The town became a ghost town, with little remaining other than two homes and the schoolhouse.

== Geography ==
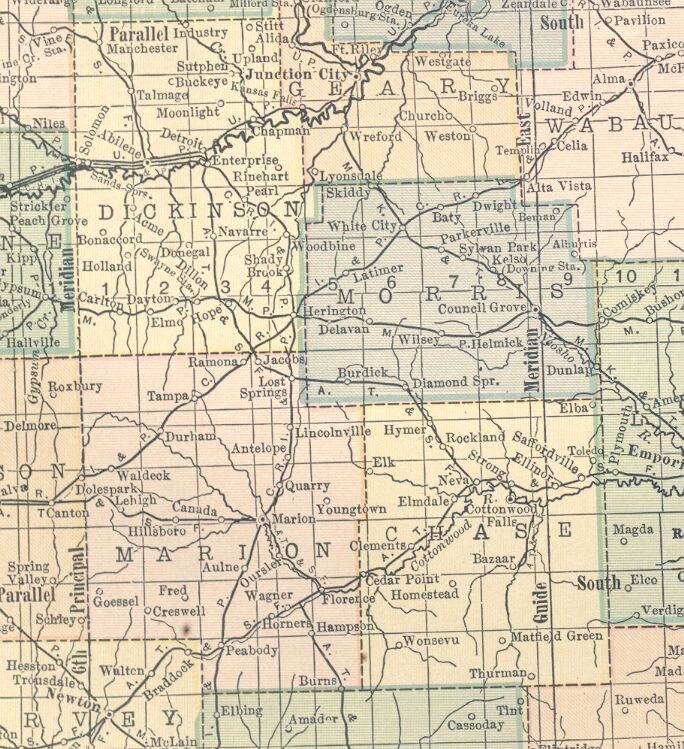
1914 Regional Railroad Map

Saffordville is located in the Cottonwood Valley in the Flint Hills of the Great Plains. The Cottonwood River is approximately 1 mi (1.6 km) to the south of the original community.

The climate in this area is characterized by hot, humid summers and generally mild to cool winters. According to the Köppen Climate Classification system, Saffordville has a humid subtropical climate, abbreviated "Cfa" on climate maps.

== Education ==
The community is served by Chase County USD 284 public school district. It has two schools.

== Notable people ==
- Fred Brickell, professional baseball player
