= Martin, Pennsylvania =

Unincorporated community in Pennsylvania, US

- Unincorporated community
- Location within Pennsylvania
- Coordinates: 39°48′23″N 79°54′35″W
- Country: United States
- State: Pennsylvania
- County: Fayette
- Elevation: 981 ft (299 m)
- Time zone: UTC-5 (Eastern (EST))
  - Summer (DST): UTC-4 (EDT)
- ZIP code: 15460
- Area codes: 724, 878
- GNIS feature ID: 1180487

Martin is an unincorporated community in Fayette County, Pennsylvania, United States. The community is located along the Monongahela River and Pennsylvania Route 166, 2.9 miles (4.7 km) south of Masontown. Martin has a post office, with ZIP code 15460.
