= Justice Jacobs =

Justice Jacobs may refer to:

- Jack B. Jacobs (fl. 2000s–2010s), associate justice of the Delaware Supreme Court
- Kenneth Jacobs (judge) (1917–2015), justice of the High Court of Australia
- Nathan L. Jacobs (1905–1989), associate justice of the New Jersey Supreme Court
- Orange Jacobs (1827–1914), chief justice of the Territory of Washington
- Richard Jacobs (judge) (born 1956), justice of the High Court of England and Wales
- Sam Jacobs (judge) (1920–2011), justice of the Supreme Court of South Australia
- Simeon Jacobs (1839–1883), chief justice of the Supreme Court of the Cape of Good Hope

== See also ==
- Robin Jacob (born 1941), former Lord Justice of the High Court of Appeal of England and Wales
- Stephen Jacob (1755–1817), sometimes misspelled as "Jacob", associate justice of the Vermont Supreme Court
- Judge Jacobs (disambiguation)
