= Cottonwood River (Kansas) =

River in Kansas, United States

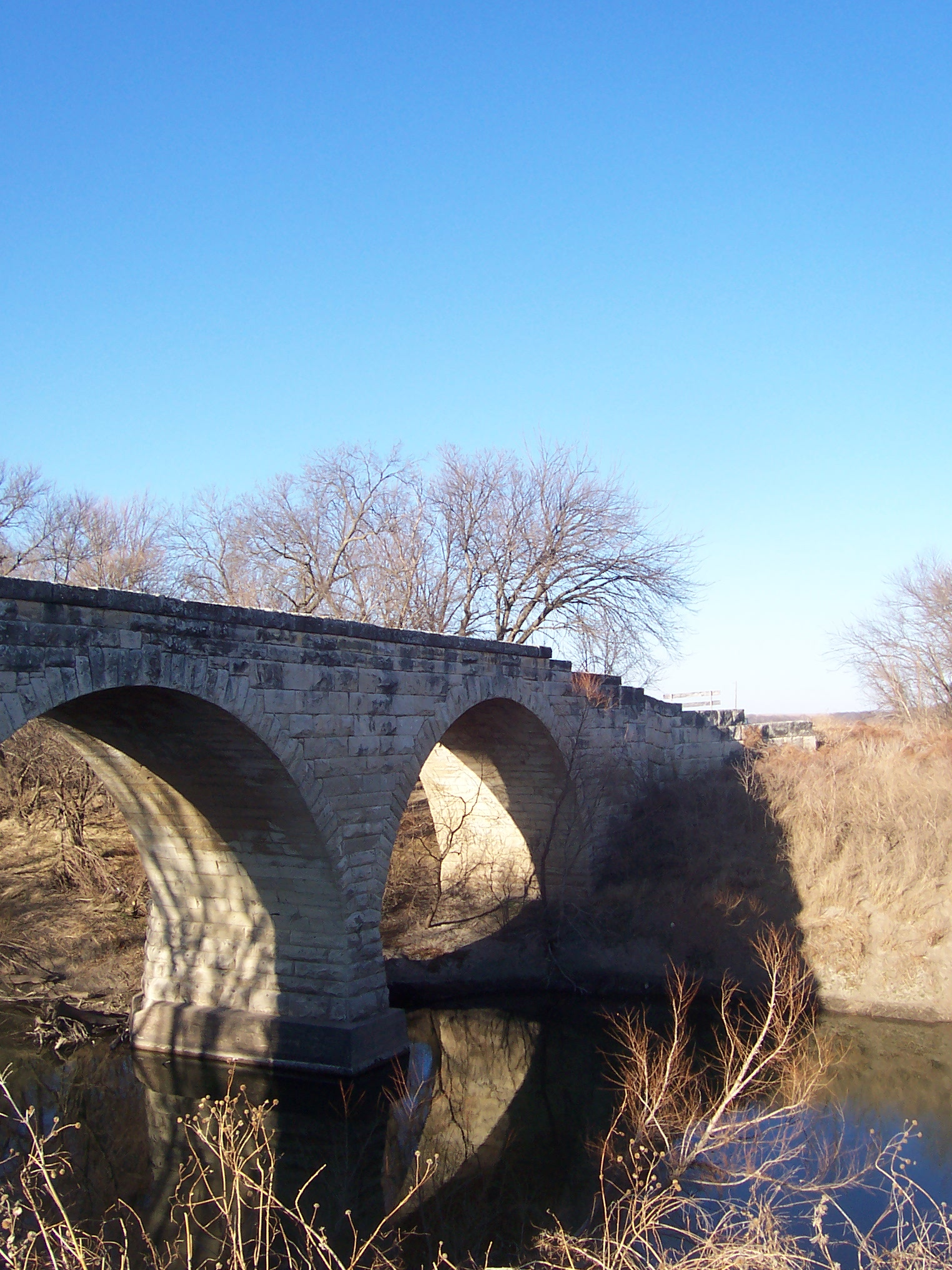
- 1886 Clements Stone Arch Bridge over Cottonwood River near Clements (2006)

Location
- Country: United States
- State: Kansas
- Region: Flint Hills

Physical characteristics
- Source
  - location: West of Marion, Kansas
  - coordinates: 38°21′25″N 097°04′14″W
  - elevation: 1,056 ft (322 m)
- Mouth: Neosho River
  - location: East of Emporia, Kansas
  - coordinates: 38°23′09″N 096°03′23″W
  - elevation: 322 ft (98 m)
- Basin size: 1,912 mi^{2} (4,950 km^{2})
- Discharge
  - location: Neosho Rapids
  - average: 1,239 cu ft/s (35.1 m^{3}/s)

Basin features
- River system: Neosho River

The Cottonwood River is one of the principal tributaries of the Neosho River in central Kansas of the United States.

== Course ==
The river begins near the west line of Marion County as two tributaries, the North Cottonwood River and the South Cottonwood River. They both start within 2 miles of each other, and within a few miles northwest of Lehigh.

The North Cottonwood starts near the west line of Marion County, crosses into McPherson County and roughly parallels the county line northward for 5 miles, then crosses back into Marion County. It flows through Durham then into the Marion Reservoir.

The South Cottonwood also starts near the west line of Marion County, flows southward about 1 mile west of Lehigh, then flows eastward about 2 miles south of Hillsboro, then northeast towards the lower side of the Marion Reservoir.

The North and South Cottonwood join about 1 mile southeast of the Marion Reservoir to become the North Fork Cottonwood River, before flowing through the city of Marion. The river flows southeast to Florence, then eastward towards Chase County. In Chase County, it flows northeast through Cedar Point then near Clements and Elmdale. It then flows eastward through Strong City, Cottonwood Falls.

The South Fork Cottonwood River starts south of Matfield Green, then flows northward along the east side of Matfield Green and Bazaar. It merges with the North Fork Cottonwood River about 3 miles east of Cottonwood Falls then flows eastward near Saffordville and across into Lyon County near Plymouth, Kansas, then along the south edge of Emporia. It flows into the Neosho River about 5 miles east of Emporia.

== History ==
In 1806, Zebulon Pike led the Pike Expedition westward from St Louis, Missouri, of which part of their journey followed the Cottonwood River through Marion County near the current towns of Florence, Marion, Durham.

== Cities and towns along the river ==
- Marion
- Florence
- Cedar Point
- Clements
- Elmdale
- Strong City
- Cottonwood Falls
- Saffordville
- Emporia

== Tributaries ==
- Cedar Creek
- Diamond Creek
- Doyle Creek
- Jacobs Creek

== Lakes ==
The following lakes are located in the Cottonwood River drainage basin:

- Marion Reservoir, northwest of Marion.
- Marion County Lake, southeast of Marion.
- Chase County State Lake, west of Cottonwood Falls.
- Camp Wood YMCA Lake, south of Elmdale.
- Peabody Country Club Lake, south of Peabody.

== Bridges ==
The following bridges over the Cottonwood River are on the National Register of Historic Places list:

- 1916 Cottonwood River Pratt Truss Bridge, 0.8 miles west of Cedar Point (38°15′36″N 96°50′02″W).
- 1886 Clements Stone Arch Bridge, 0.5 miles southeast of Clements (38°17′42″N 96°44′05″W).
- 1914 Cottonwood River Bridge, north edge of Cottonwood Falls (38°22′30″N 96°32′26″W).
- 1923 Soden's Grove Bridge, south edge of Emporia (38.385833°N 96.181667°W).

== Gallery ==
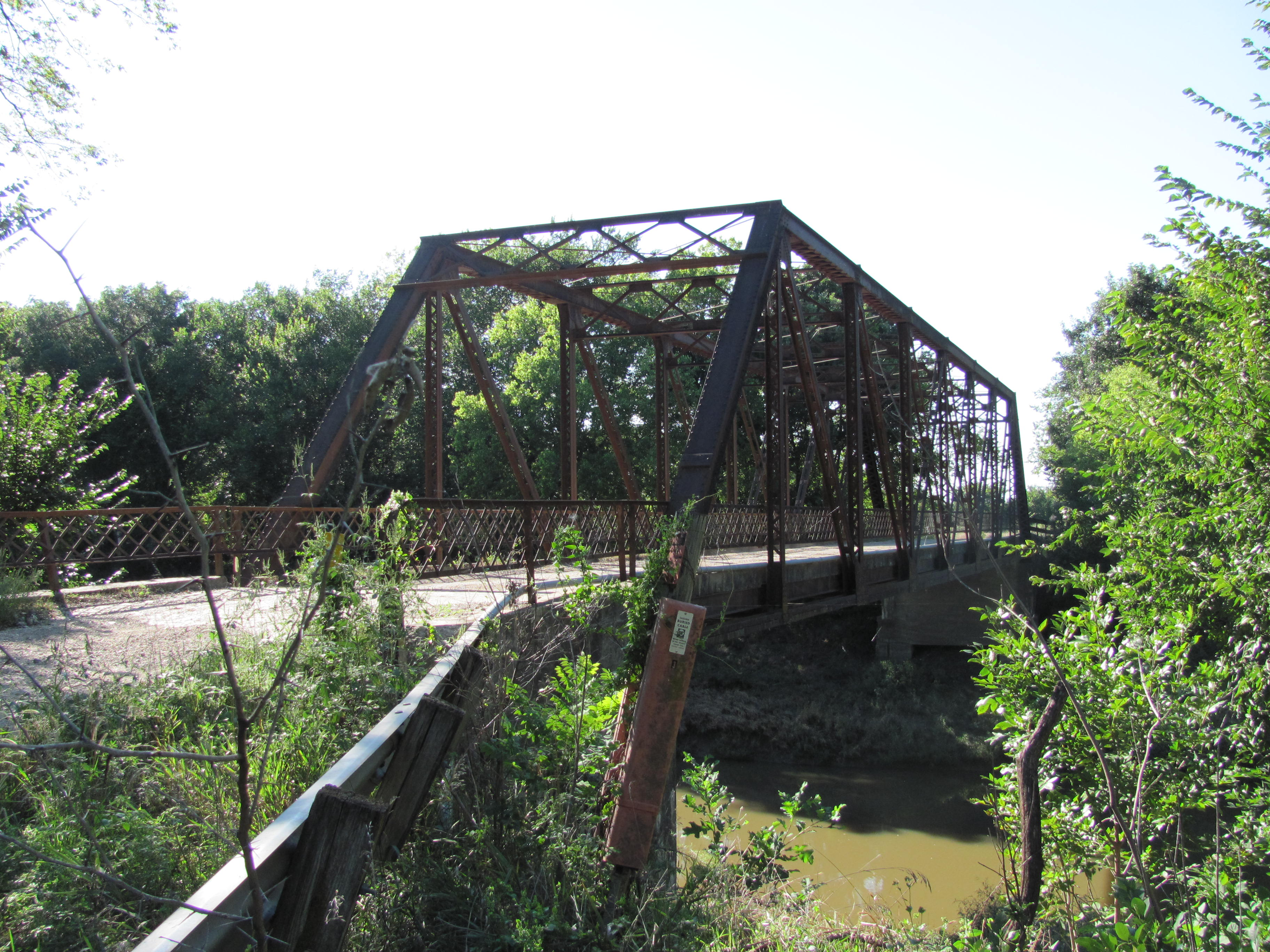
1916 Cottonwood River Pratt Truss Bridge west of Cedar Point (2012)

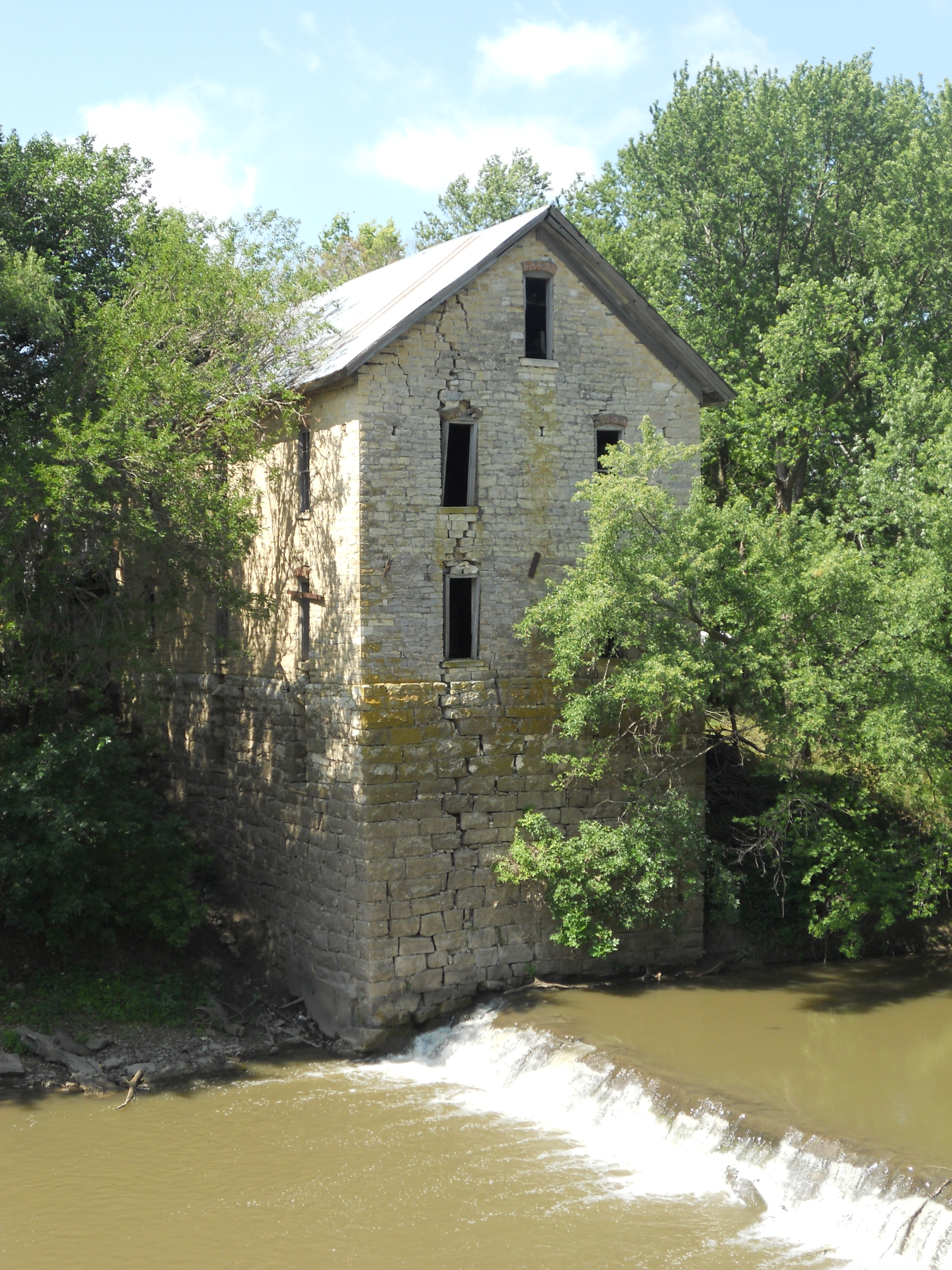
Cedar Point Mill in Cedar Point (2012)

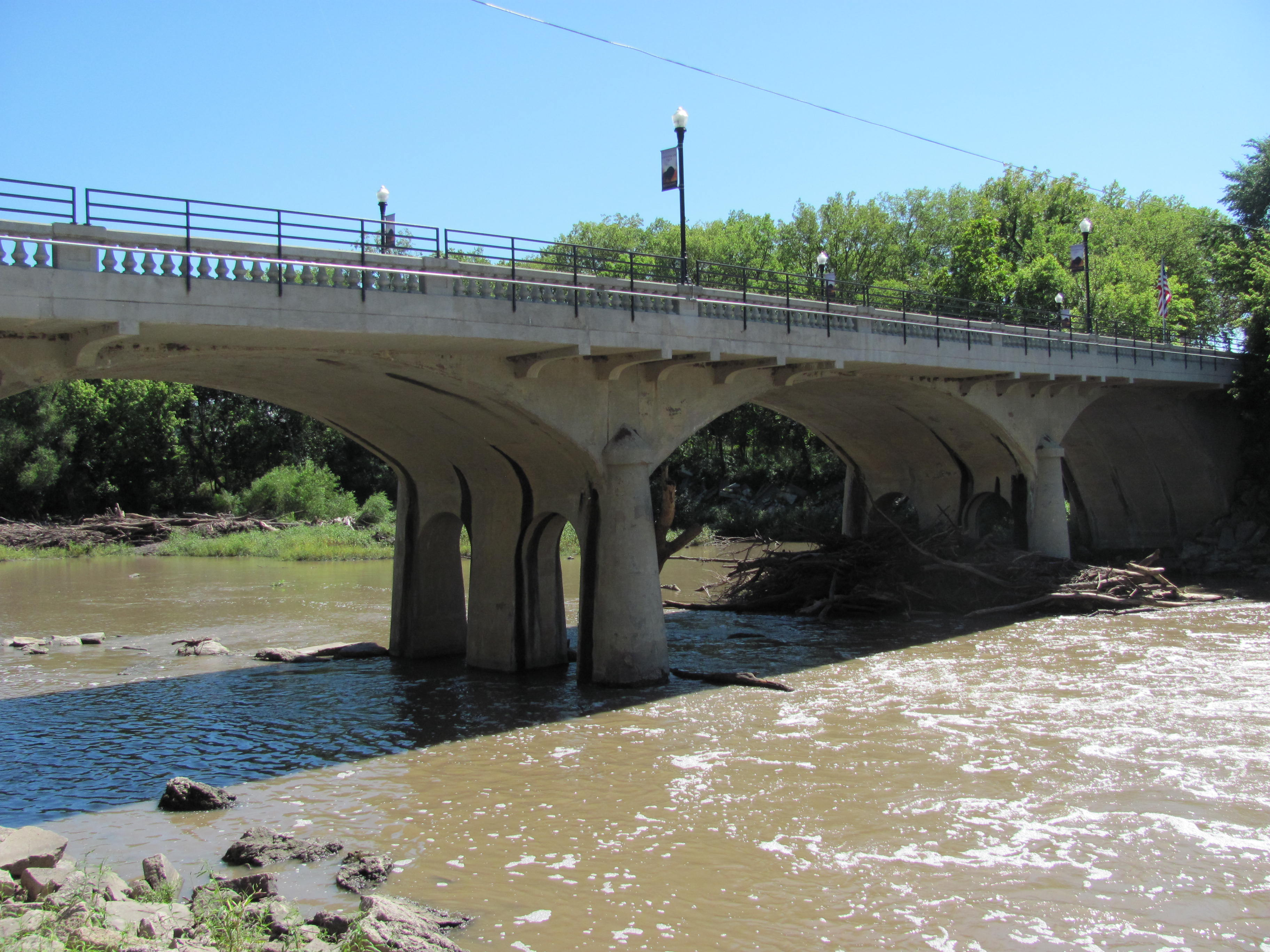
1914 Cottonwood River Bridge in Cottonwood Falls (2012)

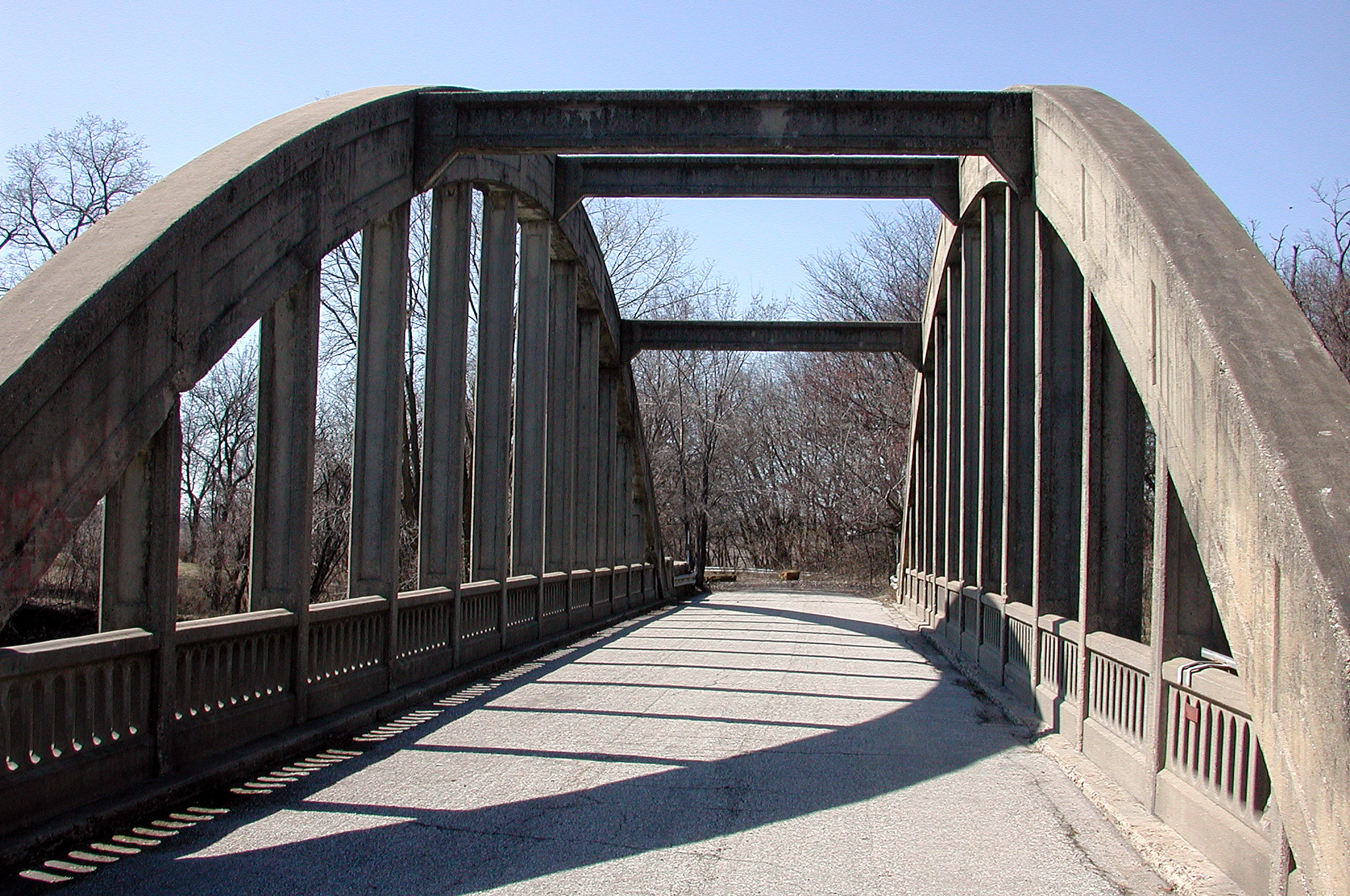
1923 Soden's Grove Bridge over Cottonwood River in Emporia (2005)

== See also ==
- Cedar Point Mill
- Jacobs Creek and Jacobs Creek Flood
- Great Flood of 1951
- List of Kansas rivers
