= Jacobs Creek flood =

2003 natural disaster in Kansas, United States

Coordinates: 38.2918°N 96.3561°W

- Date: August 30, 2003
- Location: Kansas Turnpike (I-35) 11 miles (18 km) south of Emporia, Kansas, United States
- Deaths: 6 dead in Kansas
- Property damage: $250,000 in property damage

The Jacobs Creek flood, also referred to as the Kansas Turnpike flash flood, was a flash flood of the Jacobs Creek that occurred on the night of August 30, 2003, 11 miles (18 km) southwest of Emporia, Kansas, on the Kansas Turnpike (Interstate 35). The deadly flash flood occurred on Labor Day weekend and killed six people, five inside of vehicles swept away by the floodwaters and one person who was attempting to rescue those trapped.

== August 30, 2003 flood ==
From 7:00 to 8:00 pm, a slow-moving, low-topped storm with very heavy rainfall rates developed over central Kansas, remaining over eastern Chase and western Lyon counties for several hours. The rain rate over the headwaters of Jacobs Creek is estimated to be several inches per hour with almost 6 inches (15 cm) of estimated total rainfall by 8:00 pm.

At 8:30 pm, the culvert carrying Jacobs Creek reached capacity and the flowing water began to accumulate behind the elevated embankment of the Kansas Turnpike near milepost 116. Water began flowing over the northbound lanes of the highway shortly after.

At 9:00 pm, the accumulating water from Jacobs Creek began flowing over the northbound lanes of the highway, pooling against the concrete dividers that separated the north- and southbound lanes. Some vehicles in the northbound lanes began to stall in the pooled water. Within the next 30 minutes, the water level reached the top of the concrete dividers and began spilling over into the southbound lanes of the highway. Stranded motorists attempted to exit their vehicles and swim to safety.

At 9:01 pm, KHP Trooper Marc McCune arrived as the "first on the scene". By 9:21 pm, Chase County Sheriff's department 9-1-1 dispatcher instructed stalled drivers to "stay put". A 'turnpike official' advised dispatch to ... shut down [the road] at 9:29.

At 9:35 PM, the force of the accumulated water spilling over the median barriers caused 12 of them to collapse, and the backed-up water surged over the roadway, carrying seven vehicles downstream into Jacobs Creek. Total rainfall was estimated to be from 6 inches (15 cm) to 8 inches (20 cm) and the peak flow of Jacobs Creek at the Kansas Turnpike was estimated to be 4,100 cubic feet per second (120 m^{3}/s).

Flash flooding of Jacobs Creek at the Kansas Turnpike killed four children and their mother, as well as another man who was killed after rescuing four people trapped in their vehicles. In addition, it caused about $250,000 worth of property damage along the creek. Water remained high in Jacobs Creek downstream of the turnpike for several days, impeding recovery efforts. Severely damaged vehicles and victims from the flood were found as far as 2 miles (3.2 km) away from the turnpike. The final victim was recovered on September 2 in a retention pond.

=== Aftermath ===
In August, 2004, a memorial was constructed at the Matfield Green Rest Area on the Kansas Turnpike just southwest of Jacobs Creek. Of particular mention by the memorial is Al Larsen, the individual killed while trying to rescue other trapped motorists. At a ceremony unveiling the memorial, then-Governor Kathleen Sebelius recognized the actions of Larsen, as well as Ryan Lane, who helped with the rescue efforts and survived the flood.

As of 2010, the event is used as a case study in a training module by the University Corporation for Atmospheric Research and is analyzed in detail by a paper published in the National Weather Association Digest (referenced in this article).

In 2015, the Kansas Turnpike Authority installed high-water warning signs for the flash flood-prone stretch of Kansas Turnpike (I-35) where the fatalities occurred.

In July, 2016, the Kansas Turnpike Authority upgraded the culverts at the locations of the flash flooding. At Jacobs Creek, the original 7-foot (2.1 m) by 7-ft culvert was replaced with two 14 feet (4.3 m) by 12 feet (3.7 m) culverts, designed to channel significantly more water, with a 1% probability of flooding during a given year.

== July 10, 2015 flood ==
Heavy rainfall on July 10, 2015, caused flash flooding on a tributary of Jacobs Creek, which again overwhelmed the Kansas Turnpike and caused a fatality. This flooding occurred just 2 miles (3.2 km) northeast of the site of the 2003 flood. A vehicle, driven by 21-year-old Zachary Clark, was swept off the turnpike after hitting the flood waters, and Clark was killed.

== See also ==
- List of flash floods
