= Peabody–Burns USD 398 =

Public school district in Peabody, Kansas

Address
- 506 N. Elm St. Peabody, Kansas, 66866; United States
- Coordinates: 38°10′11″N 97°6′6″W

District information
- Type: Public
- Grades: Pre-K to 12
- Established: 1965
- Superintendent: Antoinette Root
- School board: 7 members
- Schools: 2

Other information
- Website: usd398.net

Peabody–Burns USD 398 is a public unified school district headquartered in Peabody, Kansas, United States. The district includes the communities of Peabody, Burns, Wonsevu, and nearby rural areas of Marion, Chase, Harvey and Butler Counties.

== History ==
In its early history, the Peabody school district was sometimes referred as district 12 of Marion County.

The number of students in rural communities dropped significantly across the 20th century. As farming technology progressed from animal power to small tractors towards large tractors over time, it allowed a farmer to support significantly more farm land. In turn, this led to fewer farm families, which led to fewer rural students. In combination with a loss of young men during foreign wars and rural flight, all of these caused an incremental population shrinkage of rural communities over time.

In 1945 (after World War II), the School Reorganization Act in Kansas caused the consolidation of thousands of rural school districts in Kansas.

In 1946–1947, many one-room rural schools consolidated into the Peabody school district.

In 1963, the School Unification Act in Kansas caused the further consolidatation of thousands of tiny school districts into hundreds of larger Unified School Districts.

In 1964, School District 131 was formed by the merger of the former Peabody, Burns, and Summit school districts into one educational system. The first school board consisted of C. Irvin Good of Peabody, Rodney E. Vogelman of Burns, Sherwin C. Ammeter of Summit. On July 1, 1965, the school district was approved by the state to become Unified School District (USD) 398.

=== Current schools ===
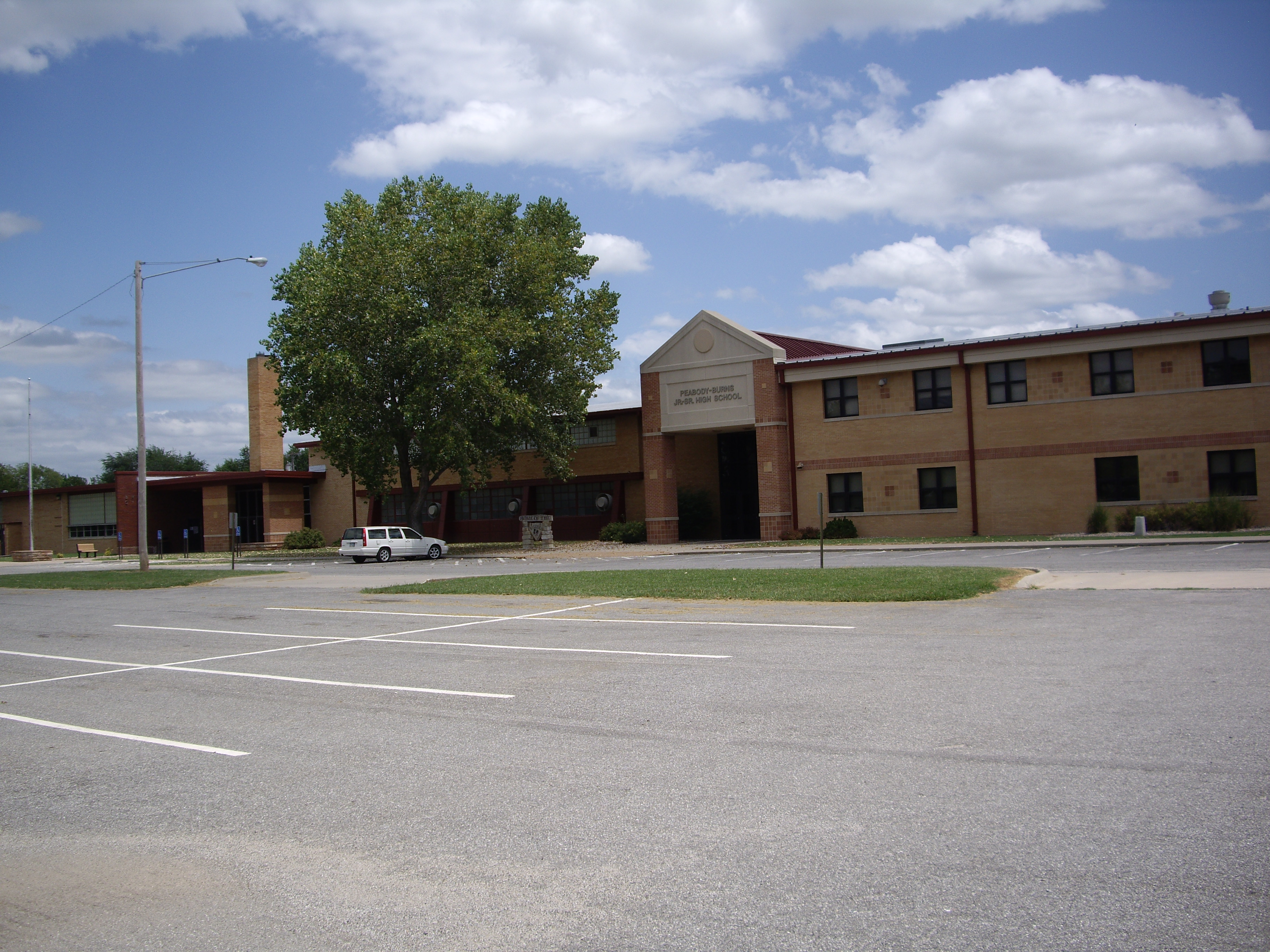
Peabody-Burns Junior/Senior High School (2010)

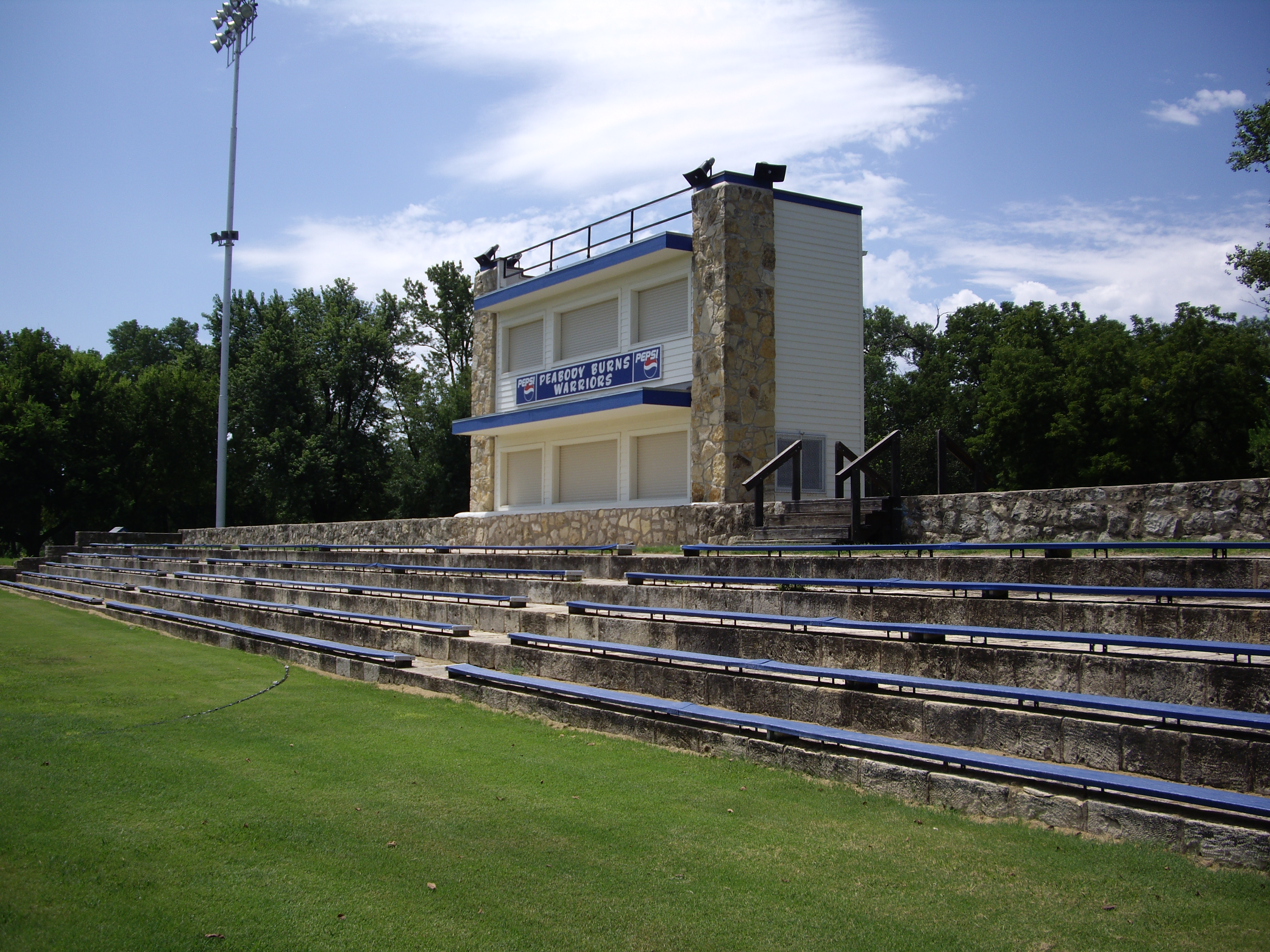
Football Stadium at Peabody City Park (looking south-west) (2010). These limestone bleachers, west and north walls, and various items in the park were built in 1938 by the WPA

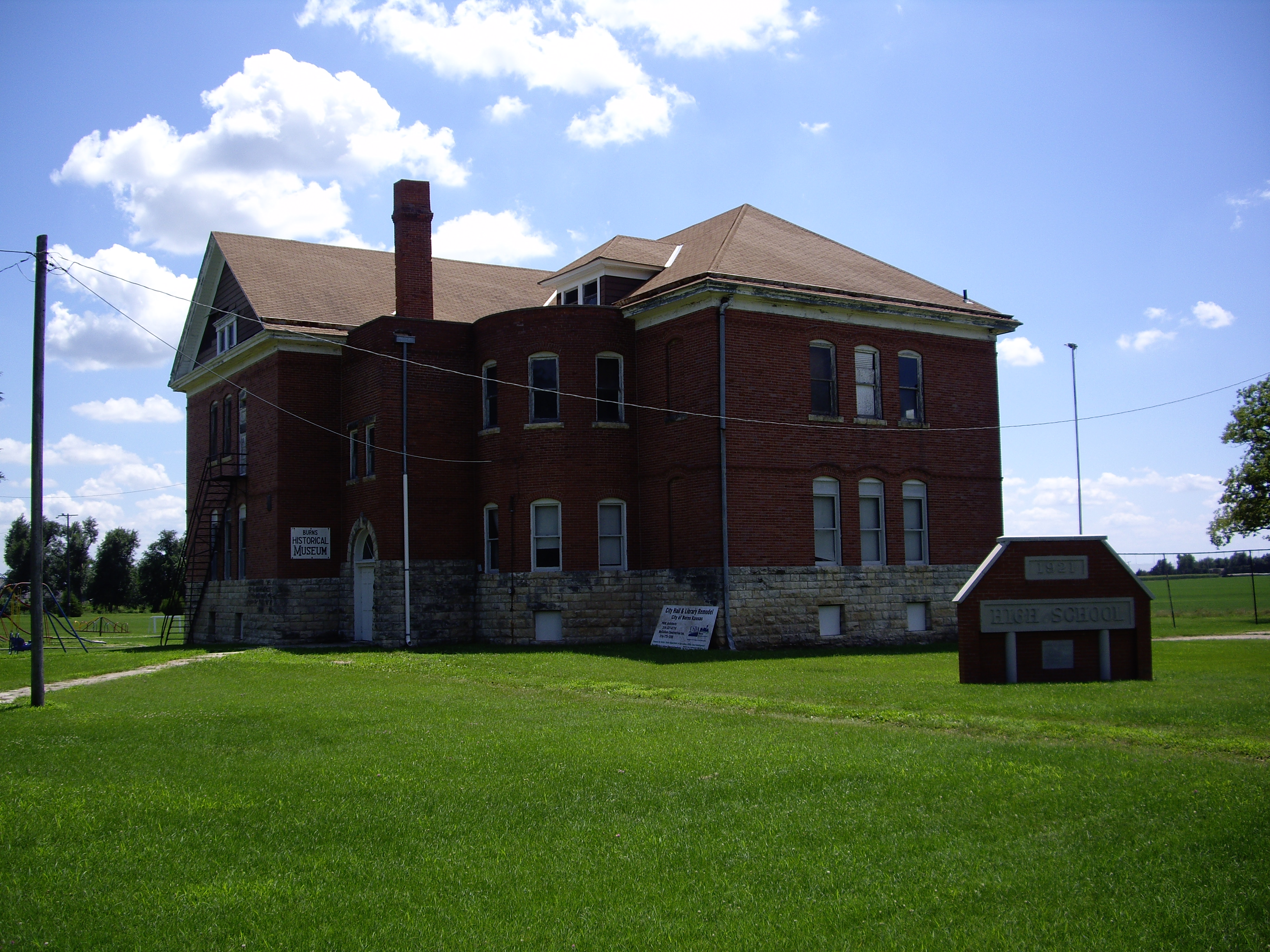
Former Burns High School in Burns. Currently it is the Burns Community Museum (2010)

The school district operates the following schools:

- Peabody-Burns Junior/Senior High School at 810 North Sycamore Street in Peabody. In 1953 the Brown Building was built, in 1997 the current school addition was built south of it.
- Peabody-Burns Elementary School at 506 North Elm Street in Peabody. The school district headquarters is located in the west side of this building. It was built in 1974.

=== Closed schools ===
- Peabody High School, northeast corner of 8th and Walnut in Peabody. It was a two-story brick building that opened in 1923. It was closed after the current high school addition was built in 1997 then demolished and converted into a football practice field.
- Peabody Elementary School, northeast corner of 2nd and Maple in Peabody. It was a large two story limestone building. It was closed after the current elementary school was built in 1974 then demolished, though the concrete steps and two retaining walls still remain. It was started in 1872 as two stone rooms, then expanded over decades to its final size.
- Burns High School, southeast corner of Main and Cincinnati in Burns. It was closed in 1965 then converted into the Burns Community Museum.
- Burns Elementary School, southwest corner of Main and Church in Burns. It was closed in 1997 then demolished.
- Summit School (rural), west side of Vista Road between 50th and 60th Streets (between Peabody and Burns). It was closed in 1965 then demolished.

=== District Superintendents ===
Decades ago, Superintendents use to teach class in addition to their administrative roles. The notes columns lists other jobs held within the same school district (not exhaustive, and may be missing some information).

Years	Name	Notes
2021 to Current	Antoinette Root
2012 to 2021	Ron Traxson
2011 to 2012	Demitry Evancho (interim)
2007 to 2011	Rex Watson
1999 to 2007	Thomas J. Alstrom
1995 to 1999	Dennis L. Versch
1990 to 1995	Robert Herbig
1982 to 1990	John G. Glover	PES principal 1968 to 1982
1980 to 1982	Norris Wika
1967 to 1980	Donald E. Martin	PHS principal 1963 to 1967
1962 to 1967	Robert D. Schmitt
1961 to 1962	John G.S. Nettleton	PHS principal 1956 to 1961
1955 to 1961	Charles Kerr
1952 to 1955	Harold M. Clark	PHS principal 1950 to 1952
1950 to 1952	Robert H. Krieger
1927 to 1950	Harry H. Brown	PHS principal 1923 to 1927, PHS teacher 1950 to 1956, Brown Building was named after him
1923 to 1927	Ira O. Scott
1919 to 1923	W.P. Reese
1917 to 1919	C.I. Vinsonhaler
1916 to 1917	P.C. Vilander	Peabody principal 1913 to 1915
1912 to 1916	A.K. Loomis
1909* to 1912	J.W. Roberts
1906* to 1908*	W.D. Ross
1901*	A.H. Bushey

== Neighboring school districts ==
The neighboring school districts to this school district are:

- Remington USD 206 - south
- Newton USD 373 - southwest
- Goessel USD 411 - west
- Hillsboro USD 410 - northwest
- Marion–Florence USD 408 - north
- Chase County USD 284 - northeast
- Flinthills USD 492 - southeast
- El Dorado USD 490 - southeast

== See also ==
- Peabody City Park, location of football field
- Peabody Gazette-Bulletin, local newspaper, contains stories about this school district
- List of high schools in Kansas
- List of unified school districts in Kansas
- Kansas State Department of Education
- Kansas State High School Activities Association
