= Catlin Township =

Catlin Township may refer to the following townships in the United States:

- Catlin Township, Vermilion County, Illinois
- Catlin Township, Marion County, Kansas
