= Burns High School =

Burns High School may refer to:

- Burns High School (Kansas) in Burns, Kansas, merged with Peabody-Burns Junior/Senior High School during the 1960s
- Burns High School (North Carolina) in Lawndale, North Carolina
- Burns High School (Oregon) in Burns, Oregon
