= Peabody-Burns Junior/Senior High School =

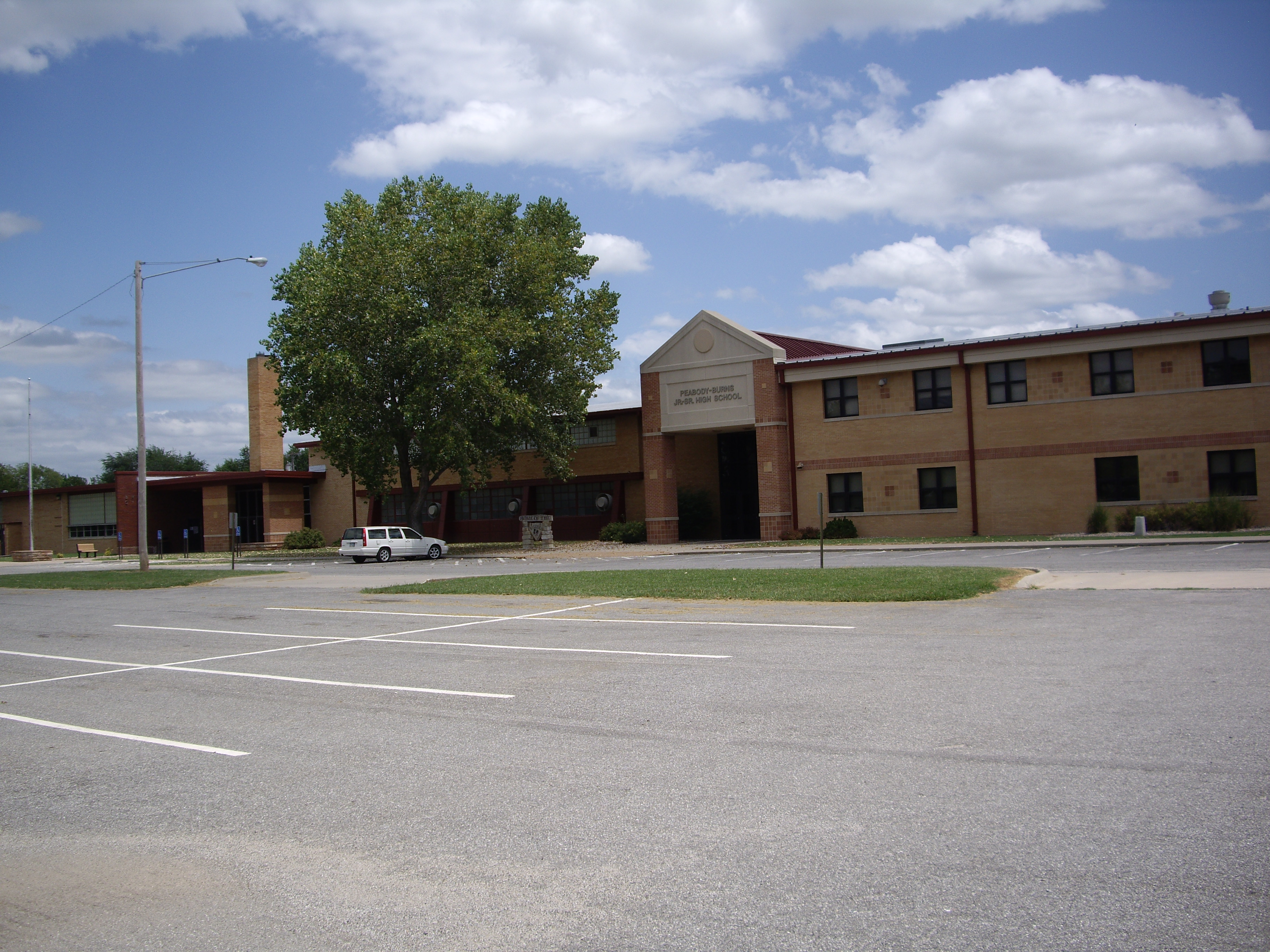
- High School (looking north-east) (2010)

Location
- 810 North Sycamore Street; Peabody, Kansas 66866; United States; 38°10′24″N 97°6′18″W

Information
- School type: Public, High School
- Established: 1997, 1923, 1879
- School board: Board Website
- School district: Peabody–Burns USD 398
- CEEB code: 172370
- Principal: Bethany Janssen
- Teaching staff: 11.30 (FTE)
- Grades: 6 to 12
- Gender: coed
- Enrollment: 106 (2023-2024)
- Student to teacher ratio: 9.38
- Campus type: Rural
- Colors: Blue; White
- Athletics: Class 8-Man I District 8
- Athletics conference: Wheat State
- Mascot: Warrior
- Yearbook: Warrior
- Communities served: Peabody, Burns, Wonsevu
- Feeder schools: Peabody-Burns Elementary School
- Website: School District

Peabody-Burns Junior/Senior High School is a public secondary school in Peabody, Kansas, United States. It is the sole high school operated by Peabody–Burns USD 398 school district. It serves students of grades 7 to 12 in the communities of Peabody, Burns, Wonsevu, and nearby rural areas of Marion / Chase / Harvey / Butler Counties.

== History ==
=== 19th century ===
The first school in Peabody was organized in 1871. The first school building, two limestone rooms, was built in 1872 on the northeast corner of Maple and 2nd. The first high school classes were taught in 1879, and the first graduation class in 1881 consisted of 2 students. As the student population grew, the school building was expanded. In 1883, a six room addition was erected. In 1901, a four room addition was erected, bringing the limestone school to a total of twelve rooms on two floors. Before fall of 1923, all grades attended this school. It was closed after the current elementary school was built in 1974 then it was demolished.

=== 20th century ===
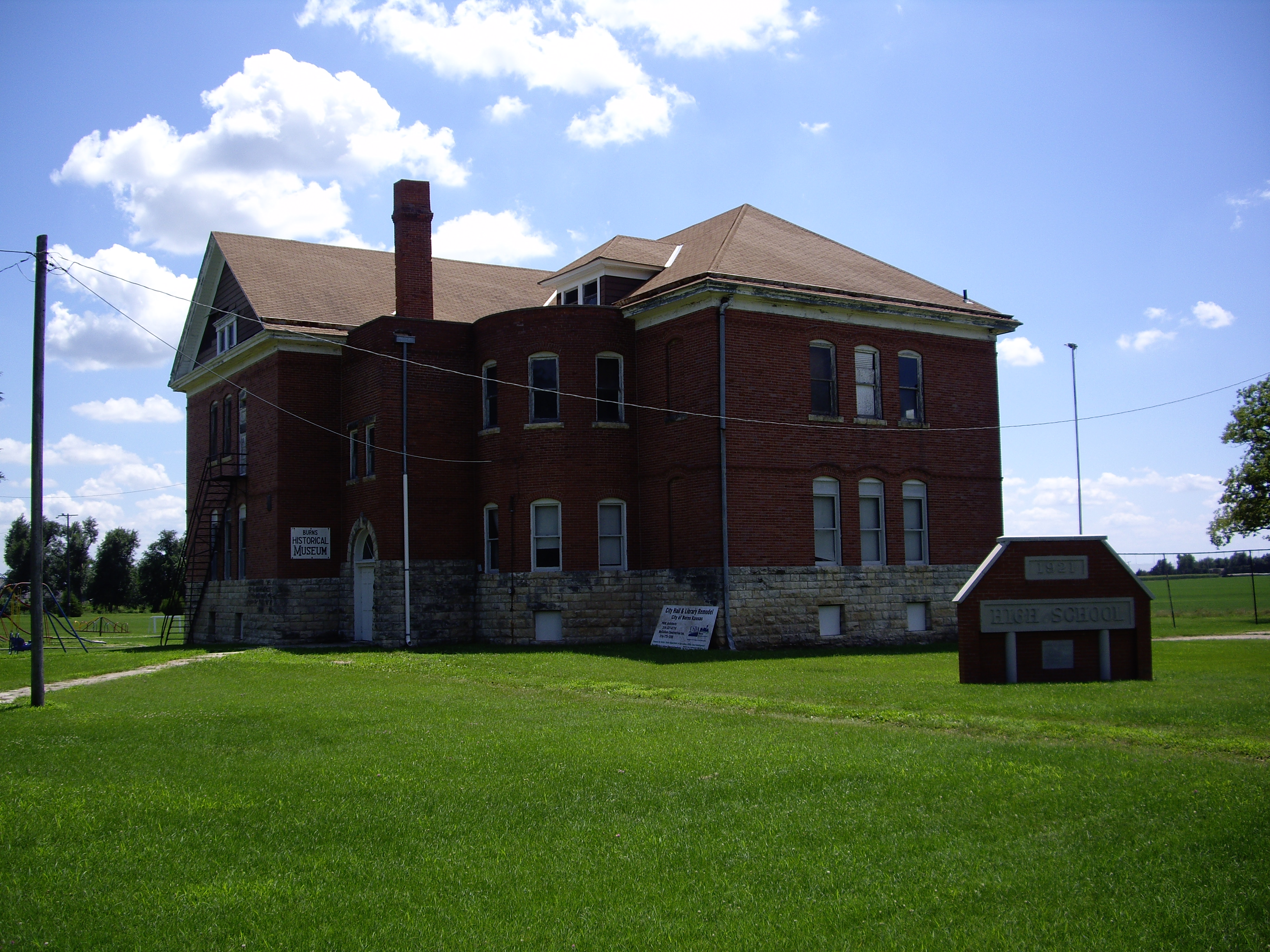
Former Burns High School in Burns. Currently it is the Burns Community Museum (2010)

In 1923, a two-story brick high school was built at 900 North Walnut Street for grades 9 to 12.

In 1945, the School Reorganization Act in Kansas caused the consolidation of thousands of rural school districts in Kansas.

In 1946-1947, many one-room rural schools consolidated into the Peabody school district.

In 1953, the Brown Building was built across the street east of the 1923 high school to house a larger gymnasium, band / lunch room, and vocational agriculture rooms.

In 1963, the School Unification Act in Kansas caused the further consolidatation of thousands of tiny school districts into hundreds of larger Unified School Districts.

In 1965, the Burns and Summit school districts were unified with Peabody to form the Unified School District 398. The Burns High School in Burns, Kansas was closed, as was the rural Summit school that was located between Peabody and Burns.

In 1997, the current high school was built (and attached) to the south side of the existing Brown Building at 810 North Sycamore Street. Soon afterward, the former 1923 high school across the street was demolished and converted into a football practice field. The Burns Grade School, which included a junior high, was closed in Burns, Kansas.

=== 21st century ===
Currently all students in the USD 398 district attend the high school and grade school in Peabody.

=== Historical school names ===
- Peabody High School (prior to 1965)
- Peabody-Burns High School (1965 to 1997)
- Peabody-Burns Junior/Senior High School (1997 to current)

== Academics ==
The high school marching band is well known in competitions, and especially popular in regional parades. The high school is a member of T.E.E.N., a shared video teaching network, started in 1993, between five area high schools.

=== Enrollment ===
In the 2010–2011 school year, Peabody-Burns Junior High School had an enrollment of 63 students, and Peabody-Burns High School had an enrollment of 105 students.

== Extracurricular activities ==
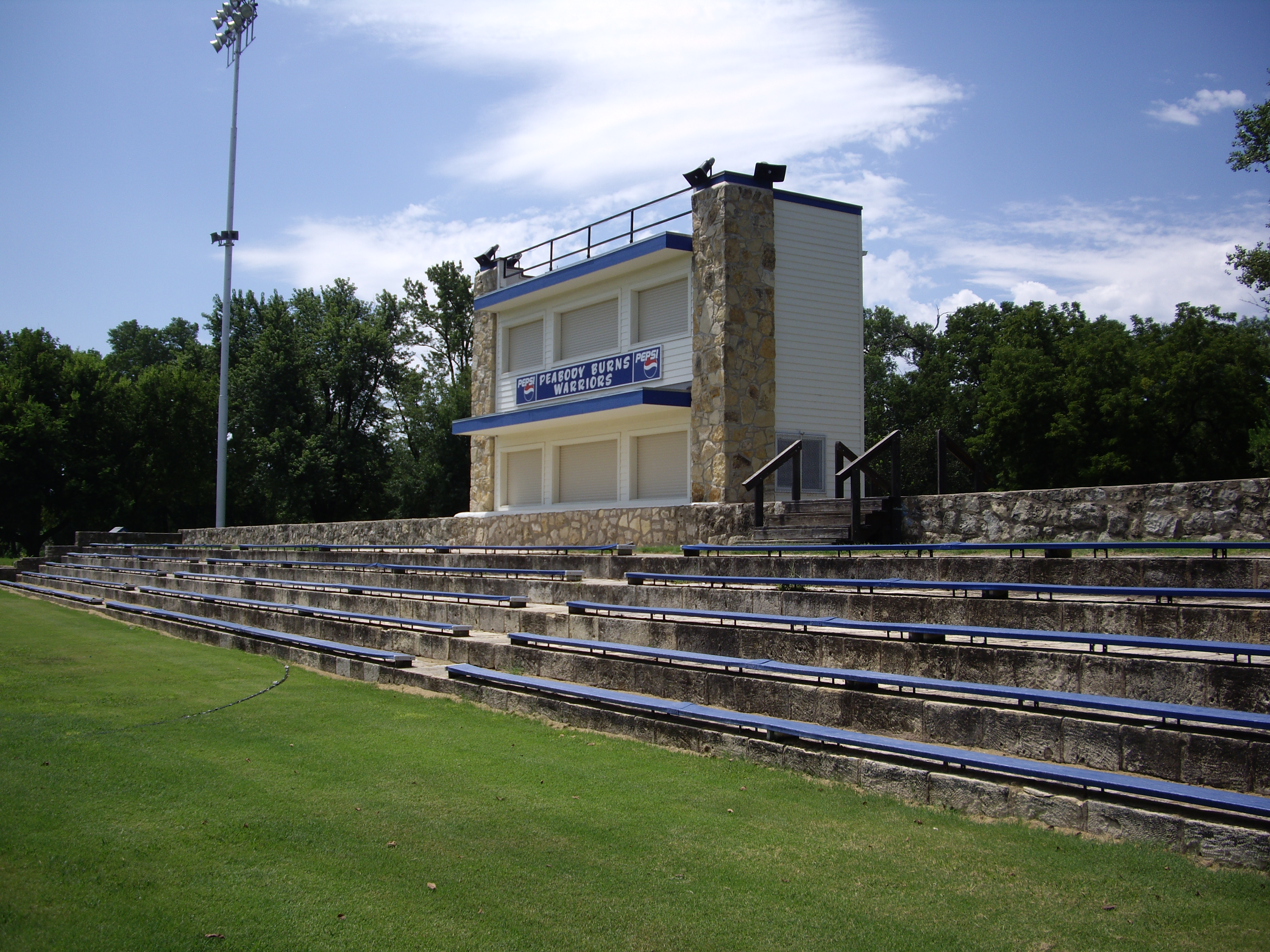
Football Stadium at Peabody City Park (looking south-west) (2010). These limestone bleachers, west and north walls, and various items in the park were built in 1938 by the WPA

The sports offered are Basketball, Bowling, Cross Country, Cheerleading, Football, Golf, Softball, Track, Volleyball, Wrestling. The mascot is a Warrior. All high school athletic and non-athletic competition is overseen by the Kansas State High School Activities Association. For 2010/2011 seasons, the football team competes as Class 8 Man - Division I in the Wheat State league.

=== State championships ===
==== Peabody-Burns High School ====
After 1964-1965 Peabody / Burns / Summit school districts consolidated into USD 398.

Boys Football:

- 1977, Class 2A, 2nd Place against Beloit, Head Coach Dennis Franchione.

Boys Golf:

- 2001, Class S (sand), Mike Hurst (Medalist).

Boys Cross Country:

- 2005, Class 2A, Andrew Topham (Individual).
- 2006, Class 2A, Andrew Topham (Individual).

Girls Cross Country:

- 1989, Class 2-1A, Laurie Miles (Individual).

Girls Outdoor Track & Field:

- 1981, Class 2A, 800-Meter Run, 2:11.50 Seconds, Lucille Carson (Individual).
- 2010, Class 2A, 400-Meter Dash, 56.58 Seconds, Lauren Pickens (Individual).

Cheer - Game Day Spirit Showcase:

- 2019, Class 1A.

==== Peabody High School ====
Before 1964-1965 Peabody / Burns / Summit school districts consolidated.

Boys Basketball:

- 1962, Class B, 2nd Place against Melvern, Head Coach Cal Reimer.
- 1963, Class B, 1st Place against Hill City, Head Coach Cal Reimer.

Girls Basketball:

- 1913, Class ?, 2nd Place.

Debate:

- 1924, Class A.

==== Burns High School ====
Before 1964-1965 Peabody / Burns / Summit school districts consolidated.

Boys Basketball:

- 1953, Class BB, 1st Place against Simpson, High School Boys Basketball, Head Coach Harvey Loy.

=== Hosted tournaments ===
The following state tournaments were hosted in Peabody.

Boys State Baseball:

- 1950 to 1960 (11 years), Class B. Held at the Peabody City Park.

Boys State Golf:

- 1984 / 1986 / 1991 (3 years), Class S (sand).

== Administration history ==
=== High School Principals ===
Decades ago, Principals use to teach class in addition to their administrative roles. The notes columns lists other jobs held within the same school district (not exhaustive, and may be missing some information).

Years	Name	Notes
2024 to Current	Bethany Janssen
2022 to 2024	Ryan Bartel
2021 to 2022	Tyler Schroeder
2017 to 2021	Scott Kimble
2014 to 2017	Ken Parry	*
2007 to 2014	Tim Robertson
2000 to 2007	Mary Brown
1998 to 2000	Dan Bradfield
1996 to 1998	Cris Leonard
1991 to 1996	John M. Ireland	PHS teacher 1976 to 1991, PHS coach & assistant coach
1989 to 1991	Gregg Pennington
1982 to 1989	Don Hague
1979 to 1982	Wayne Blessing
1973 to 1979	Jerry L. Webster
1967 to 1973	H. Clinton Hill
1963 to 1967	Donald E. Martin	Superintendent 1967 to 1980
1961 to 1963	Donald M. White
1956 to 1961	John G.S. Nettleton	Superintendent 1961 to 1962
1955 to 1956	Richard Brewer	PHS science teacher
1954 to 1955	Richard Brewer (Vice Principal)	PHS science teacher
1953 to 1954	Richard Brewer (Admin Asst)	PHS science teacher
1952 to 1953	Willard Hilton (Admin Asst)	PHS science teacher
1950 to 1952	Harold M. Clark	Superintendent 1952 to 1955
1943 to 1950	Floyd Talley	PHS science teacher 1942 to 1950
1939 to 1943	Charles A. Burgtorf	PHS math teacher 1939 to 1943
1931 to 1939	Frank M. Leatherman	PHS math teacher 1928 to 1939
1927 to 1931	Paul B. Johnsten	PHS teacher
1923 to 1927	Harry H. Brown	Superintendent 1927 to 1950, PHS teacher 1950 to 1956, Brown Building named after him

== Notable people ==
=== Faculty ===
- C. M. Arbuthnot (1852-1920), physician, founder of Arbuthnot Drug Company, principal of Peabody High School for two years
- Dennis W. Franchione (born 1951), head college football coach at Southwestern College, Pittsburg State University, University of New Mexico, Texas Christian University, University of Alabama, Texas A&M University, Texas State University; head football coach of Peabody High School from 1976 to 1977

=== Alumni ===
- Warren A. Bechtel (1872–1933) (class of 1891), founder of Bechtel engineering and construction company. In 1925, Warren, his three sons, and his brother joined together to form the W.A. Bechtel Company, and was one of the Six Companies, Inc. that constructed the Hoover Dam.
- Rebecca L. Ediger (born 1952) (class of 1970), United States Secret Service agent, Special Award for Distinguished Service to the Executive Office of the President

=== School district ===
List of notable students who attended schools in Peabody, but graduated from another high school:

- Nick Hague (born 1975), NASA astronaut, Colonel in United States Air Force, deployed in Iraq War, test pilot at 416th Flight Test Squadron, teacher at United States Air Force Academy. Nick attended schools in Peabody from 1982 to 1989 while his father was principal of this High School.
- Willard J. Madsen (1930-2016), professor emeritus at Gallaudet University, sign language expert, author of two sign language text books, attended grade school in Peabody

== See also ==
- Peabody City Park, location of football field
- Peabody Gazette-Bulletin, local newspaper, contains stories about USD 398 school district
- List of high schools in Kansas
- List of unified school districts in Kansas
