= Peabody Township, Kansas =

Peabody Township Marion County, Kansas
- Township
- Location within Marion County

- Location within the state of Kansas
- Coordinates: 38.1307624°N 97.0977035°W
- Country: United States
- State: Kansas
- County: Marion

Area
  - Total: 36 sq mi (93 km^{2})

Dimensions
  - Length: 6.0 mi (9.7 km)
  - Width: 6.0 mi (9.7 km)
- Elevation: 1,434 ft (437 m)

Population (2020)
  - Total: 1,117
  - Density: 31/sq mi (12/km^{2})
- Time zone: UTC-6 (CST)
  - Summer (DST): UTC-5 (CDT)
- Area code: 620
- FIPS code: 20-55125
- GNIS ID: 477777
- Website: County website

Peabody Township is a township in Marion County, Kansas, United States. As of the 2020 census, the township population was 1,117, including most of the city of Peabody.

== Geography ==
Peabody Township covers an area of 36 square miles (93.2 km^{2}).

== Cities and towns ==
The township contains the following settlements:

- City of Peabody (south of 9th Street). A small north part of Peabody is located in Catlin Township.

== Cemeteries ==
The township contains the following cemeteries:

- No cemeteries. The Prairie Lawn Cemetery for the city of Peabody is located in Catlin Township.

== Transportation ==
Two railroads, BNSF Railway and Union Pacific Railroad, pass through the township. The BNSF Railway runs northeast to southwest through the township. The Oklahoma Kansas Texas (OKT) line of the Union Pacific Railroad runs north to south through the township.

U.S. Route 50 passes along the northern township edge, and follows roughly parallel to the BNSF Railway.
