= Peabody, Kansas =

City in Marion County, Kansas

- City
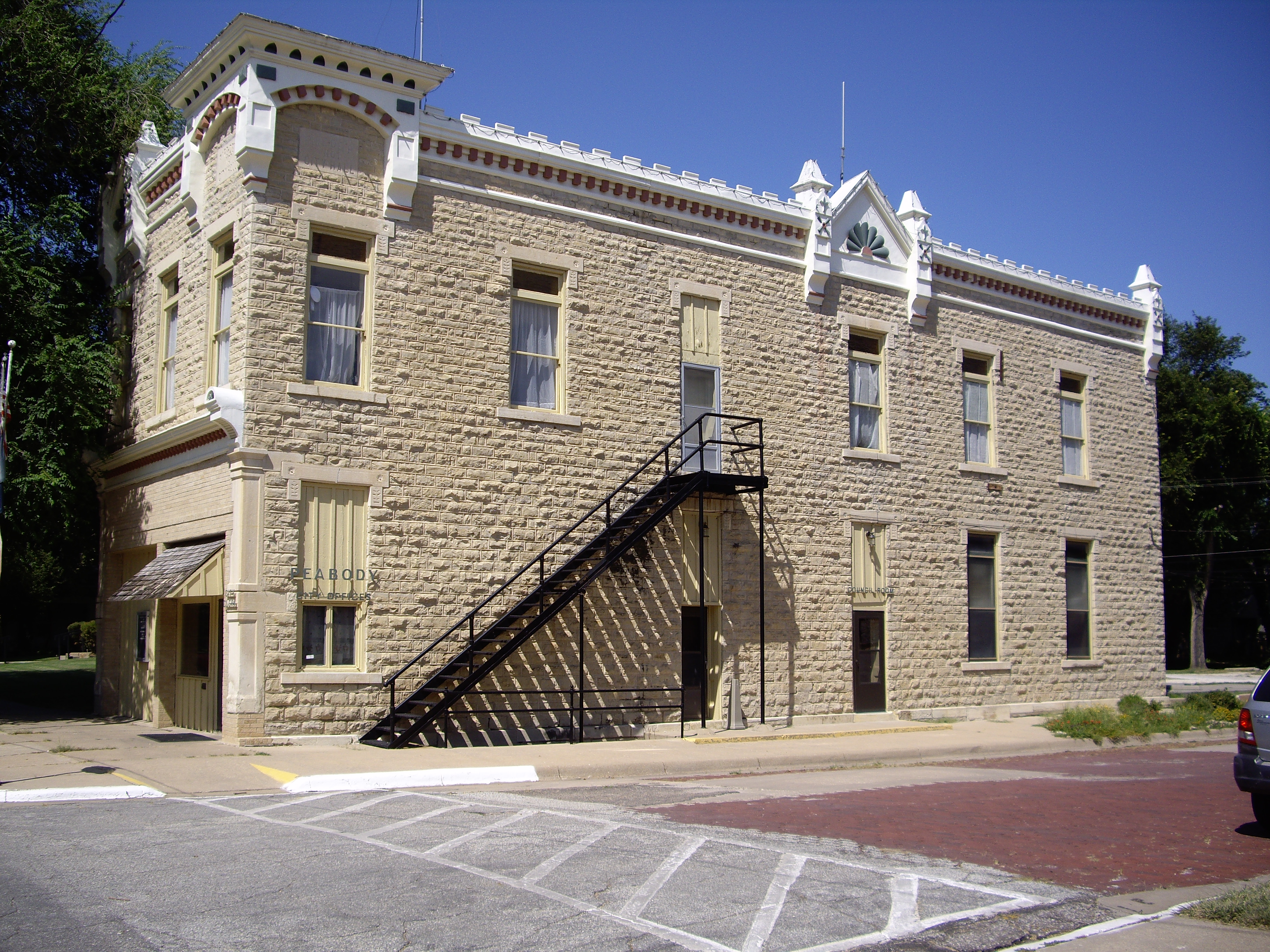
- 1886 Peabody City Hall at 300 N Walnut St (2010)

- Location within Marion County and Kansas

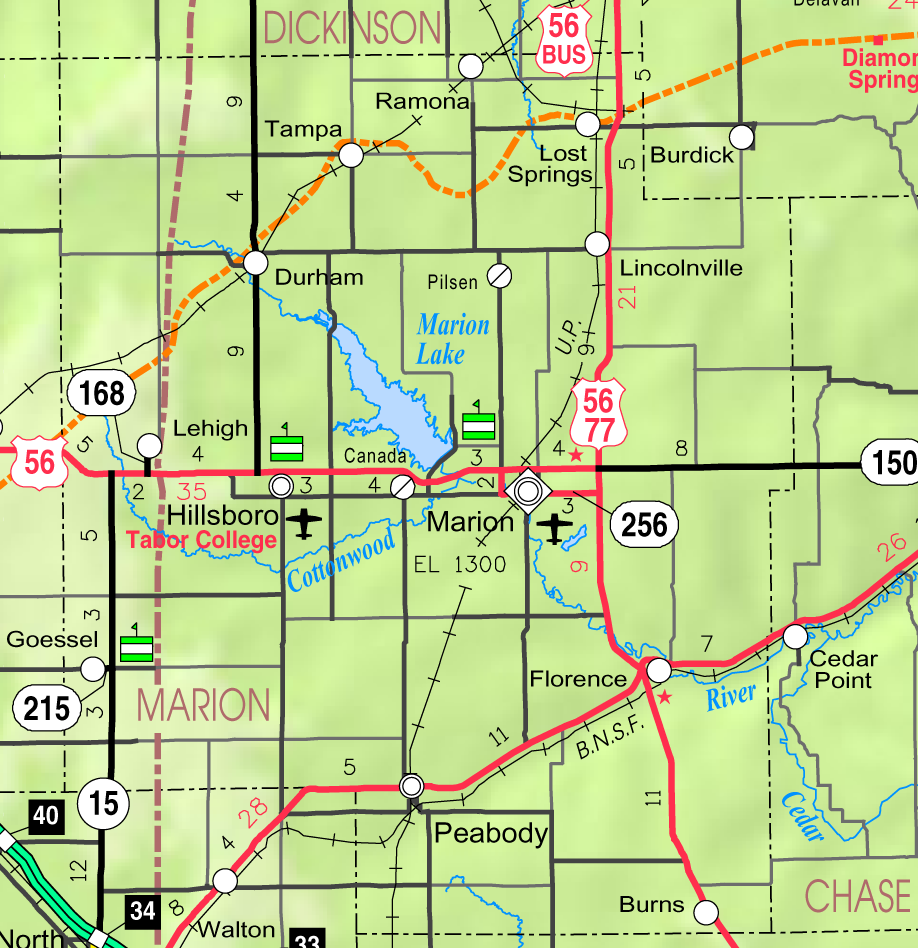
- KDOT map of Marion County (legend)
- Coordinates: 38°10′06″N 97°06′16″W
- Country: United States
- State: Kansas
- County: Marion
- Township: Peabody
- Founded: 1870 (Coneburg); 1871 (Peabody)
- Platted: 1871 (Coneburg); 1871, 1875 (Peabody); 1878 (North Peabody)
- Incorporated: 1879 (Peabody)
- Named for: John Cone (Coneburg); F.H. Peabody (Peabody)

Government
  - Type: Mayor–Council
  - Mayor: Bailey Penner[

Area
  - Total: 1.27 sq mi (3.28 km^{2})
  - Land: 1.27 sq mi (3.28 km^{2})
  - Water: 0 sq mi (0.00 km^{2})
- Elevation: 1,375 ft (419 m)

Population (2020)
  - Total: 937
  - Density: 740/sq mi (286/km^{2})
- Time zone: UTC−6 (CST)
  - Summer (DST): UTC−5 (CDT)
- ZIP Code: 66866
- Area code: 620, exchange 983
- FIPS code: 20-55100
- GNIS ID: 2396169
- Website: PeabodyKS.com

Peabody is a city in Marion County, Kansas, United States. As of the 2020 census, the population of the city was 937. The city was named after F.H. Peabody of Boston, former vice-president of the Atchison, Topeka and Santa Fe Railway. Peabody is well known in the region for its Independence Day Celebration on July 4, and its historic 1880s downtown main street. It is located between Newton and Florence along U.S. Route 50 highway.

== History ==
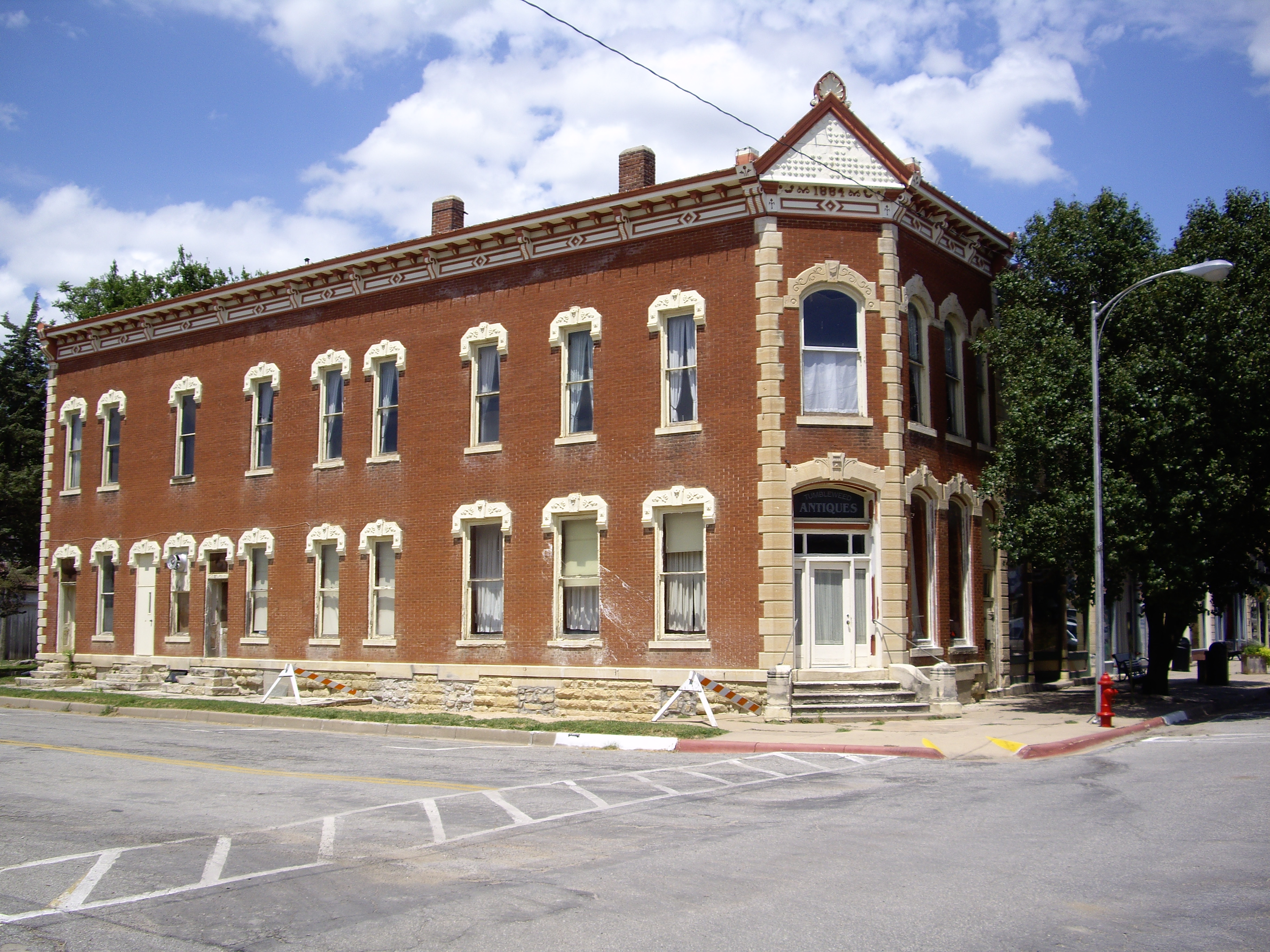
The 1884 Peabody Bank Building was a bank from 1884 to 1922. The current bank is located a block north. (2010)

=== Early history ===
For millennia the Great Plains of North America were inhabited by nomadic Native Americans. From the 16th to 18th centuries, the Kingdom of France claimed ownership of large parts of North America. In 1762, after the French and Indian War, France secretly ceded New France to Spain, by the Treaty of Fontainebleau.

=== 19th century ===
In 1801 to 1802, Spain returned most of the land to France, keeping title to about 7,500 square miles. In 1803, most of the land for modern day Kansas was acquired by the United States from France as part of the 828,000 square mile Louisiana Purchase.

In 1854, the Kansas Territory was organized under the provisions of the Kansas–Nebraska Act, then in 1861 Kansas became the 34th U.S. state. In 1855, Marion County was established, which included the land for modern day Peabody.

In 1864, the first settler in the Peabody area was W.C. Coble, from North Carolina, who set up ranch headquarters about 2+ miles east of the current city of Peabody (now section 36 of Catlin Township). The first settlement made in the area was in September 1870, by a colony of settlers from Wisconsin. In October, more settlers arrived. During the first month, the colony officers laid out a town on the north-half of section 4 township 22 and surveyed it into lots. The town was named Coneburg after the town company president John Cone. The town site was located between the current 9th Street and Division Avenue. During the winter of 1870, some of the settlers returned east to get supplies and bring out their families. In 1871, while the other settlers were gone, dissatisfaction arose in the community and it began to break up. Claim jumping of the Coneburg town site and nearby land started to occur, thus causing a legal mess.

In 1870, T.M. Potter homesteaded the south-half of the same section of land. In spring of 1871, he and five other men started the Peabody town company. Since the land title for the Peabody town site had no legal disputes, businesses immediately moved from Coneburg. In June 1871, the town of Peabody was platted, and it included the land where the railroad was built on June 9.

A post office was established in Coneburg on January 25, 1871, then moved to Peabody on October 30, 1871.

In April 1872 during legal disputes, Coneburg became North Peabody. A revised plat of Peabody was made in July 1875 and a supplemental plat of North Peabody was made in April 1878. Because of the disputes, the street that ran down the middle of the border between the two towns was called "Division Avenue." The two towns merged into the city of Peabody in 1879.

The town of Peabody was named in 1871 after F.H. Peabody, of Boston, formerly vice-president of the Atchison, Topeka and Santa Fe Railway company. In May 1874, Mr. Peabody visited the new town, at which time he announced he would donate money for a library building, furniture, books, periodicals and landscaping if the Peabody township would secure four town lots for the site. The contract for construction was awarded in spring of 1875 and was opened to the public in June 1875, and the following February 1876 the state legislature authorized the township to levy a tax to support the library. The structure housed the library facilities until 1914 when a new Peabody Township Carnegie Library was constructed on the old location.

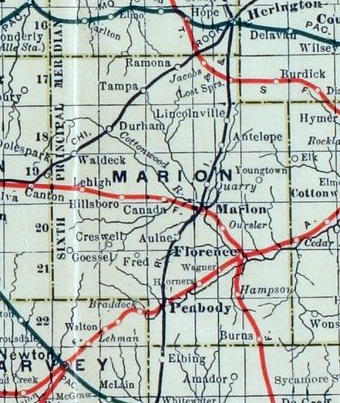
1915 railroad map of Marion County

In 1871, the Atchison, Topeka and Santa Fe Railway extended a main line from Emporia through Peabody to Newton. In 1996 it merged with Burlington Northern Railroad and renamed to the current BNSF Railway. Most locals still refer to this railroad as the "Santa Fe". The first depot was built south of the tracks. Later a train wreck destroyed it and a second depot was built on the north side of the tracks. In 1873, three westbound trains (9:05 am, 1:00 pm, 8:30 pm) and three eastbound trains (4:42 am, 6:50 pm, 8:30 pm) stopped at the Peabody depot. Rail service was still very strong five decades later. In 1925, three westbound and four eastbound trains made stops at Peabody. The second depot was demolished in the 1970s after passenger transportation ended, then its land was converted into the Santa Fe Park, which is located at the south end of Walnut Street. Currently Amtrak's Southwest Chief passenger train currently passes through Peabody twice each day, but stops at nearby Newton.

During most of the 1870s, the railway depots in Peabody and Florence were the only access points for train passengers into Marion County and northern Butler County. Peabody was a destination for numerous foreign homesteaders, including the Mennonite settlers around Goessel and Gnadenau.

In 1887, the Chicago, Kansas and Nebraska Railway built the "Rock Island" branch line north–south from Herington through Peabody and Wichita to Caldwell. By 1893, this branch line was incrementally built to Fort Worth, Texas. It foreclosed in 1891 and was taken over by Chicago, Rock Island and Pacific Railway, which shut down in 1980 and reorganized as Oklahoma, Kansas and Texas Railroad. The company merged in 1988 with Missouri Pacific Railroad finally merging in 1997 with Union Pacific Railroad. Most locals still refer to this railroad as the "Rock Island". Its depot in Peabody was demolished in the early 1960s.

In 1875, Peabody held its first agricultural "county fair" and continued to hold them annually for many years. In September 1885, the Kansas State Fair was held at Peabody during the first four days of the month. An outstanding feature of the state fair was "the First Monument to General Grant", who died shortly before the fair. The temporary monument was an obelisk about 40 feet (12 m) tall, and built from forty bushels of ears of corn. The fair had a grandstand, which could hold 2000 people, to view horse races. The race track was used for a variety of events, including horse walking teams in harness, trotting, running, pacing, mule racing, and daily chariot races. A dining hall was built that was capable of feeding 10,000 people each day. In 1900, the Marion County Agricultural Society sold the fair grounds to the city, which renamed it the Peabody City Park, and its entrance is located at the corner of Locust and 2nd Streets.

Peabody was the home of famous race horses around the turn of the century. Three of the more famous horses were world champions. Joe Young (known as the "iron horse") sold for $10,000 by C.E. Westbrook, the first horse west of the Mississippi River to sell for such a high price. Joe Young sired Joe Patchen in 1889, who earned his owner $40,000 in race purses and then was sold for $44,000. Joe Patchen sired Dan Patch in 1896, a horse that sold in 1907 for $60,000. Other famous local racing horses included trotters McKinney, and Silver Sign. Silverthorne toured Austria where he competed for three years against the best race horses in Europe.

=== 20th century ===
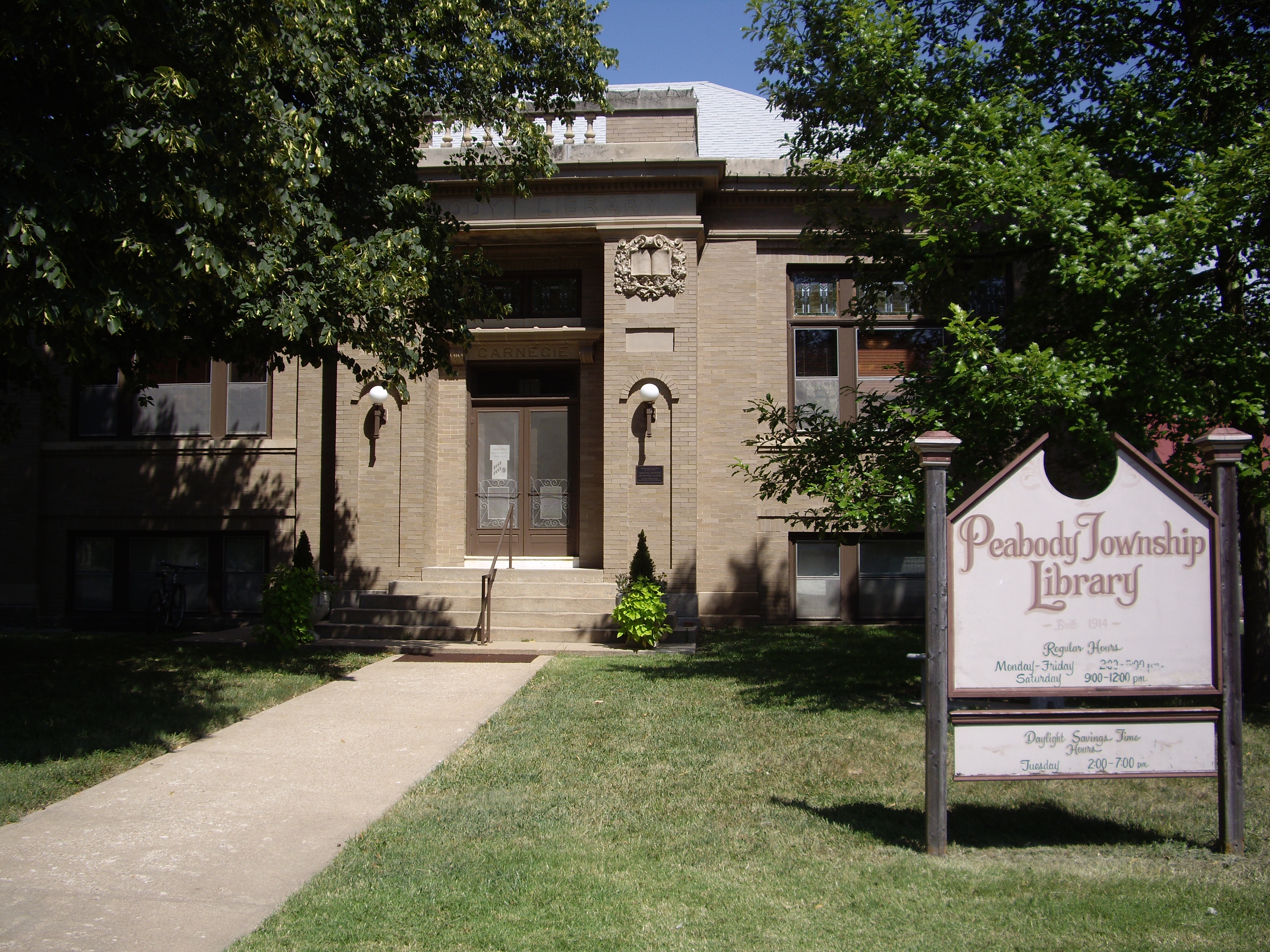
1914 Peabody Township "Carnegie" Library (2010)

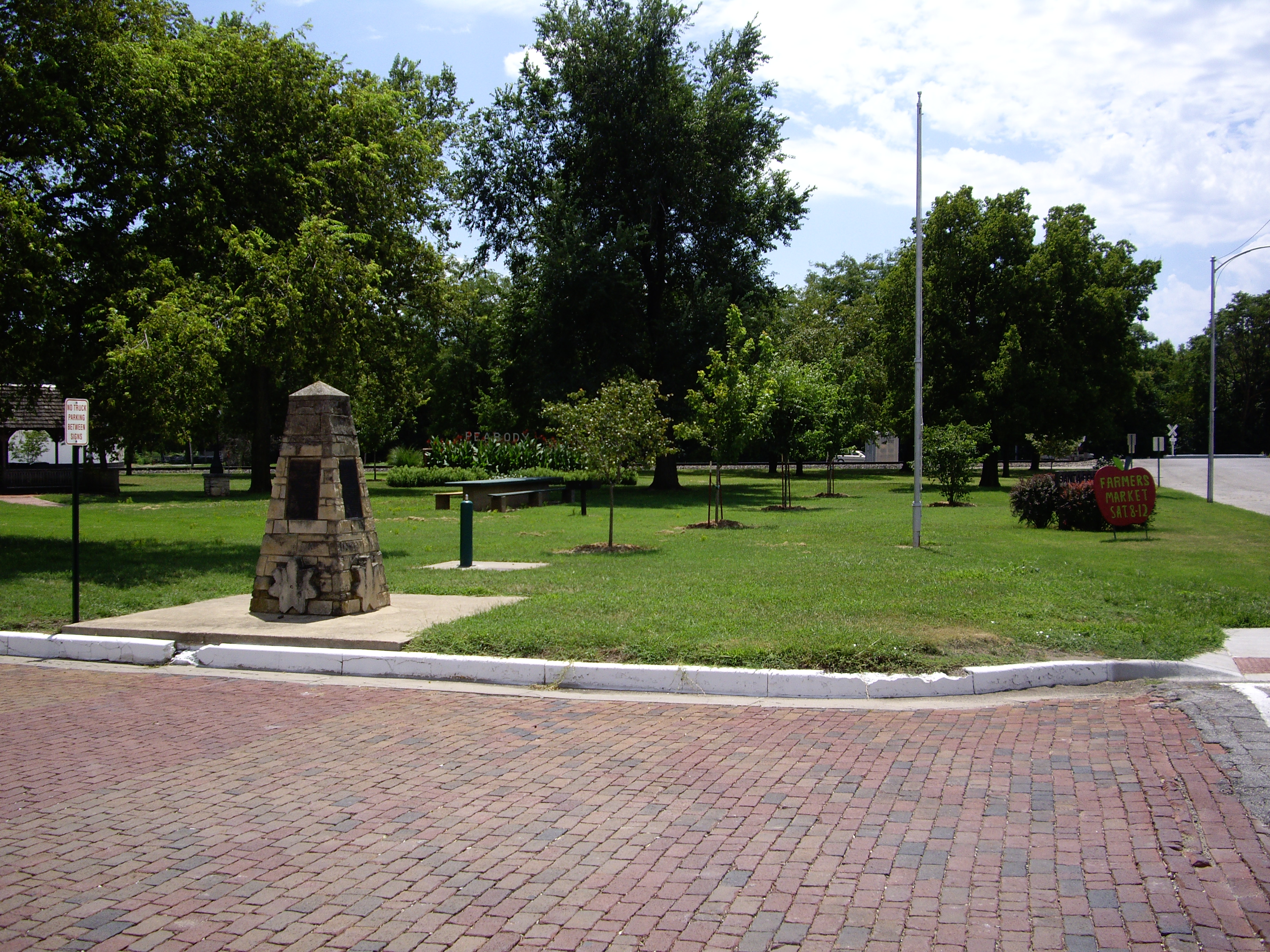
1974 Mennonite Centennial Memorial Monument in Santa Fe Park A threshing stone was cut and placed on 4 sides of this monument. In the foreground is a brick street; streets in Peabody are typically brick (2010).

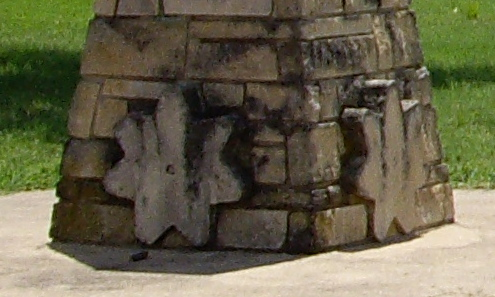
Cross sections of a threshing stone on a Mennonite monument (2010)

Peabody became an important supply point for one of the state's cattle feeding districts. By 1911, approximately 20,000 head of cattle were imported from other states and fed within 20 miles (32 km) of Peabody at 50 farms. Because of the cattle industry, local farmers grew more corn, alfalfa, and other feed crops during the 1900s and 1910s.

Peabody and Watchorn areas experienced an oil boom from 1918 to 1920 in the oil fields of the Mid-Continent oil province. The influence of the petroleum industry remained strong in Peabody, and resulted in the greatest change upon the community in the shortest time. More than 100 residences were constructed in October and November 1919. From 1918 to 1919, the population increased by 75% or more, but later decreased as oil booms in other Kansas areas needed the workers. Currently Watchorn is a ghost town consisting of oil wells but no remaining historical structures.

The New Santa Fe Trail road was routed through Peabody in the late 1910s. The road entered the north-east side of the city on Old Mill Rd, and exited on the south-west side on 60th Street (known as the Old Trail). The trail became U.S. Route 50 in the late 1930s when the new highway was routed east to west on 9th Street. In 1998, the highway was moved about 1.5 blocks north so it could go over a new railroad overpass.

In 1943, German and Italian prisoners of World War II were brought to Kansas and other midwest states as a means of solving the labor shortage caused by American men serving in the war effort. Large prisoner-of-war camps camps were established in Kansas at Camp Concordia, Camp Funston (at Fort Riley), and Camp Phillips (at Salina under Fort Riley). Fort Riley established 12 smaller branch camps, including Peabody and El Dorado. Up to 150 prisoners were quartered at the Peabody branch camp. Farmers were to have first priority over other industries in requesting prisoner labor. County agents were responsible for processing the application of local residents seeking the use of the prisoners who were to be available only as group laborers. No fewer than four prisoners could be assigned to a farm, and a guard accompanied each group, but later it was common for no guards to accompany the prisoners. The prisoners were not allowed to operate any powered farm equipment. The farmer collected the workers at the camp and returned them at the end of each day. The Peabody branch camp #101 was located in the Eyestone building, now occupied by Heckendorn Equipment Company, and located at 122 West 2nd Street. The prisoner yard was located in the north-east corner of the property and still exists as a storage area. The camp was closed in December 1945, after Germany surrendered.

There have been numerous floods during the history of Peabody. In June and July 1951, due to heavy rains, rivers and streams flooded numerous cities in Kansas, including Peabody. Many reservoirs and levees were built in Kansas as part of a response to the Great Flood of 1951.

The community gradually increased in size as a commuter town to support aircraft industries in Wichita during World War II and Soviet Union Cold War years. Over time the aircraft industry worker requirement has shrank, thus has their influence on numerous commuter towns. Another gradual impact on the community has been the decrease in the size of farm families. Over time as farm equipment has increased in size, so has it decreased the number of family farms in the area, because fewer people are required to farm larger amounts of land. Fewer farms families has led to a gradual decrease in children at local schools. Peabody, like most rural towns, has seen a gradual loss of population due to rural flight to larger cities.

The community has long had great pride in celebrating and promoting its past. Three centennials, the Kansas centennial in 1961, the Peabody centennial in 1971, and the United States Bicentennial in 1976 caused surges of historic pride. It led to the creation of the Peabody Main Street Association (PMSA) in 1989 and the Peabody Community Foundation (PCF). The Peabody Main Street Association has won numerous awards since it was founded.

In 1998, the downtown area of Peabody was placed on the National Register of Historic Places (NRHP), and known as the Peabody Downtown Historic District. Peabody had four previous listings on the NRHP: Peabody Historical Library Museum (in 1973), Peabody Township Library (in 1987), J.S. Schroeder Building (in 1991), and W.H. Morgan House (in 1996).

=== 21st century ===
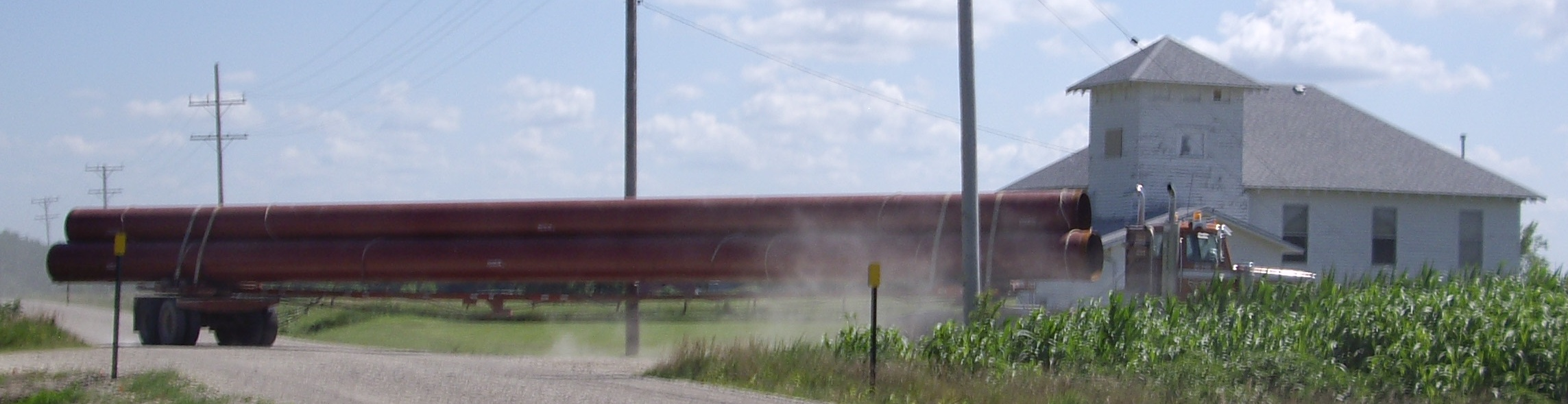
Truck hauling 36-Inch pipe to build Keystone-Cushing Pipeline (Phase II) south-east of Peabody at corner of Timber Rd and 20th St in Marion County. (Whitewater Center Church in background) (2010)

In 2010, the Peabody Main Street Association received 5 state awards. In the same year, the Keystone-Cushing Pipeline (Phase II) was constructed 4.5 miles (7.2 km) east of Peabody, north to south through Marion County. There was quite a bit of controversy over road damage, tax exemption, and environmental concerns (if a leak ever occurs).

In 2012, the Peabody City Park was placed on the National Register of Historic Places (NRHP), the sixth in Peabody.

== Geography ==
Peabody is located in the scenic Flint Hills and Great Plains of the state of Kansas.

According to the United States Census Bureau, the city has a total area of 1.34 square miles (3.47 km^{2}), all land except Doyle Creek and Spring Creek. It is approximately 15 mi (24 km) north-east of Newton, 42 mi (68 km) north of Wichita, 164 mi (264 km) south-west of Kansas City. The north-eastern corner of Harvey County is 2.0 miles (3.2 km) west of Peabody.

=== Climate ===
On average in Peabody, January is the coolest month with an average low of 19 °F (-7 °C), July is the warmest month with an average high of 92 °F (33 °C), and May is the wettest month with an average precipitation of 4.64 in. The hottest temperature recorded in Peabody was 115 °F (43 °C) in 1954; the coldest temperature recorded was -22 °F (-31 °C) in 1989.

Climate data for Peabody, Kansas
Month	Jan	Feb	Mar	Apr	May	Jun	Jul	Aug	Sep	Oct	Nov	Dec	Year
Record high °F (°C)	76 (24)	82 (28)	91 (33)	95 (35)	101 (38)	112 (44)	115 (46)	111 (44)	109 (43)	97 (36)	88 (31)	78 (26)	115 (46)
Mean daily maximum °F (°C)	41 (5)	48 (9)	59 (15)	69 (21)	77 (25)	86 (30)	92 (33)	91 (33)	82 (28)	71 (22)	55 (13)	44 (7)	68 (20)
Mean daily minimum °F (°C)	19 (−7)	24 (−4)	34 (1)	44 (7)	53 (12)	63 (17)	68 (20)	66 (19)	58 (14)	46 (8)	33 (1)	23 (−5)	44 (7)
Record low °F (°C)	−17 (−27)	−20 (−29)	−6 (−21)	12 (−11)	27 (−3)	40 (4)	45 (7)	45 (7)	24 (−4)	10 (−12)	−9 (−23)	−22 (−30)	−22 (−30)
Average precipitation inches (mm)	0.82 (21)	0.96 (24)	2.52 (64)	2.82 (72)	4.64 (118)	4.49 (114)	3.79 (96)	3.33 (85)	3.24 (82)	2.53 (64)	2.17 (55)	1.07 (27)	32.38 (822)
Source: The Weather Channel; National Weather Service

== Demographics ==
Historical population
Census	Pop.	Note	%±
1880	1,087		—
1890	1,474		35.6%
1900	1,369		−7.1%
1910	1,416		3.4%
1920	2,455		73.4%
1930	1,491		−39.3%
1940	1,367		−8.3%
1950	1,194		−12.7%
1960	1,309		9.6%
1970	1,368		4.5%
1980	1,474		7.7%
1990	1,349		−8.5%
2000	1,384		2.6%
2010	1,210		−12.6%
2020	937		−22.6%
U.S. Decennial Census

=== 2020 census ===
The 2020 United States census counted 937 people, 397 households, and 236 families in Peabody. The population density was 740.1 per square mile (285.8/km^{2}). There were 514 housing units at an average density of 406.0 per square mile (156.8/km^{2}). The racial makeup was 89.65% (840) white or European American (86.55% non-Hispanic white), 1.49% (14) black or African-American, 0.53% (5) Native American or Alaska Native, 0.21% (2) Asian, 0.0% (0) Pacific Islander or Native Hawaiian, 1.71% (16) from other races, and 6.4% (60) from two or more races. Hispanic or Latino of any race was 5.55% (52) of the population.

Of the 397 households, 24.7% had children under the age of 18; 42.8% were married couples living together; 31.5% had a female householder with no spouse or partner present. 35.0% of households consisted of individuals and 18.6% had someone living alone who was 65 years of age or older. The average household size was 2.4 and the average family size was 3.0. The percent of those with a bachelor's degree or higher was estimated to be 10.9% of the population.

20.1% of the population was under the age of 18, 5.7% from 18 to 24, 19.2% from 25 to 44, 30.8% from 45 to 64, and 24.2% who were 65 years of age or older. The median age was 48.8 years. For every 100 females, there were 103.7 males. For every 100 females ages 18 and older, there were 108.6 males.

The 2016–2020 5-year American Community Survey estimates show that the median household income was $43,924 (with a margin of error of +/- $2,762) and the median family income was $47,500 (+/- $2,725). Males had a median income of $23,611 (+/- $10,367) versus $25,227 (+/- $14,309) for females. The median income for those above 16 years old was $23,750 (+/- $6,810). Approximately, 3.0% of families and 12.5% of the population were below the poverty line, including 2.9% of those under the age of 18 and 16.6% of those ages 65 or over.

=== 2010 census ===
As of the census of 2010, there were 1,210 people, 478 households, and 299 families residing in the city. The population density was 903.0 inhabitants per square mile (348.7/km^{2}). There were 566 housing units at an average density of 422.4 per square mile (163.1/km^{2}). The racial makeup of the city was 93.2% White, 1.6% African American, 1.2% Native American, 0.2% Asian, 0.1% Pacific Islander, 0.8% from other races, and 2.8% from two or more races. Hispanic or Latino of any race were 3.3% of the population.

There were 478 households, of which 27.8% had children under the age of 18 living with them, 50.4% were married couples living together, 7.7% had a female householder with no husband present, 4.4% had a male householder with no wife present, and 37.4% were non-families. 32.8% of all households were made up of individuals, and 15.3% had someone living alone who was 65 years of age or older. The average household size was 2.33 and the average family size was 2.94.

The median age in the city was 45.8 years. 22.2% of residents were under the age of 18; 6.2% were between the ages of 18 and 24; 20.1% were from 25 to 44; 29.5% were from 45 to 64; and 21.8% were 65 years of age or older. The gender makeup of the city was 50.3% male and 49.7% female.

== Economy ==
The largest employer in Peabody is Peabody–Burns USD 398, which has two schools in the city.

== Arts and culture ==
=== Area events ===
- July 4 Celebration, 100th annual in 2021, fireworks are displayed in the historic Peabody City Park (near Locust and 2nd streets) The fireworks are famous for the display at the end which is called the Battle of New Orleans; over a million individual items are expoded in the display. In the 1960s and 1970s, up to 30,000 or more people attended the event, including a carnival of rides.
- Doyle Valley Farmers Market, Santa Fe Park (near Walnut and 1st streets), Memorial Day to Labor Day, 8 am to noon

=== Area attractions ===
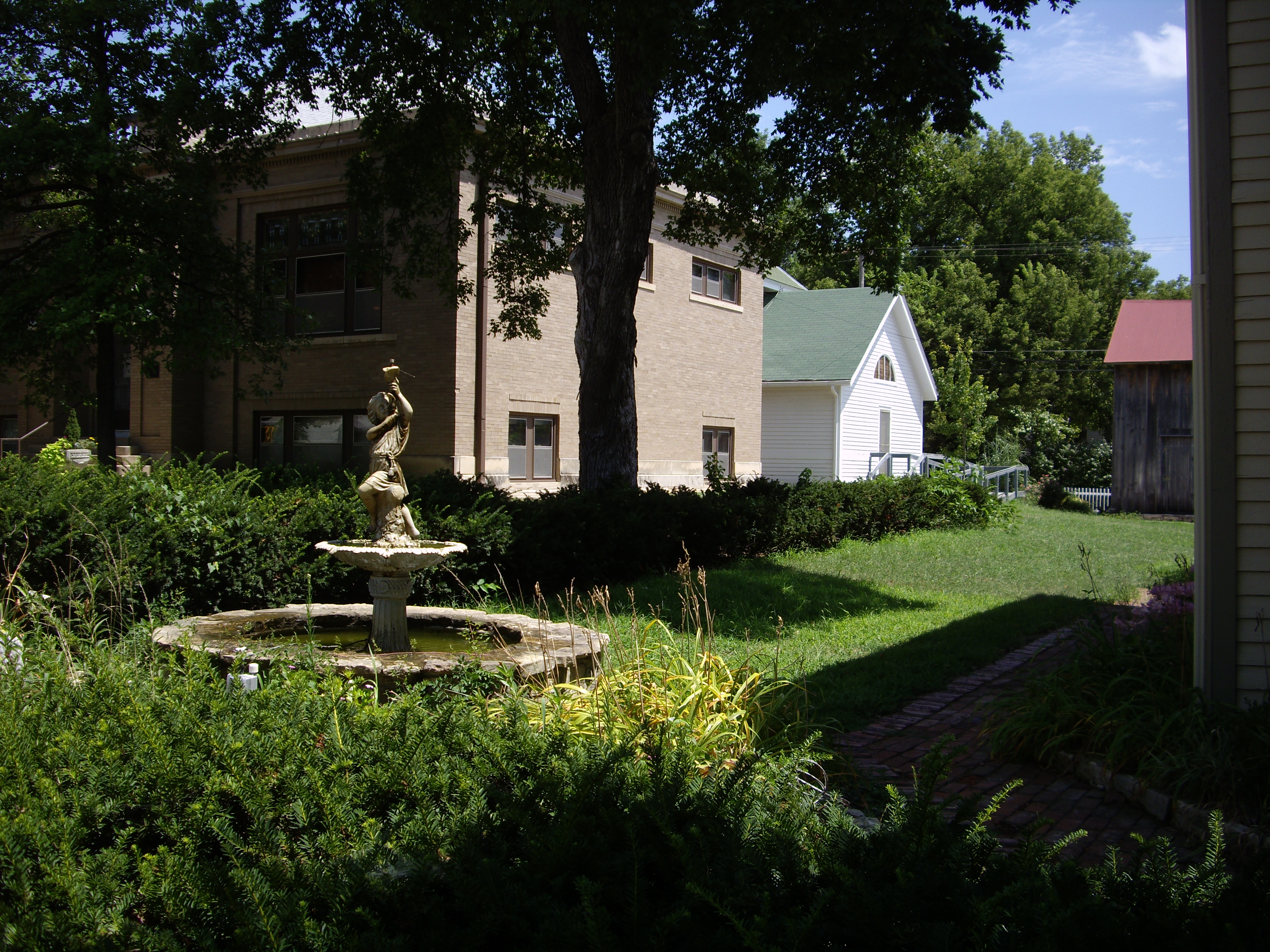
Fountain next to W.H. Morgan House (immediate right), W.H. Morgan Barn (back right with red roof), Carnegie Library (left with brown brick), and museum (back middle with green roof) Looking north-east (2010)

Peabody has six listings on the National Register of Historic Places (NRHP).

- 1880s Peabody Downtown Historic District (NRHP). The Downtown Business District of Peabody boasts of 42 contributing buildings in the district. The significant period for the district began in 1874 with the construction of the first free public library and ended in 1922 with the decline in oil production. Peabody is the second community in the State of Kansas to have its entire downtown district on the National Register of Historic Places.
  - 1884 J.S. Schroeder Building (NRHP), 111 North Walnut Street. Many types of businesses were on the first floor, but most older locals remember it as the McMillen grocery store. For the past couple of decades, the first floor has been occupied by the Mayesville Mercantile.
  - 1914 Peabody Township Carnegie Library (NRHP), 214 North Walnut Street.
  - 1919 Eyestone building, previously a POW camp during World War II, 122 West 2nd Street, private business.
- Peabody Museum Historical Complex, Memorial Day to Labor Day.
  - 1874 Peabody Historical Library Museum (NRHP), 106 East Division Avenue (east of Carnegie Library). After the new Carnegie library was built in 1914, the first library was moved and used for club meetings and stood idle for a number of years. In 1960, while planning for the 1961 Kansas centennial celebration, local citizens organized to move the structure to a lot near its original location. The old library building was converted and dedicated as a museum on July 3, 1961.
  - 1881 W.H. Morgan House (NRHP), 212 North Walnut Street. A two-story Queen Anne Cottage built by W.H. Morgan, first editor of the Peabody Gazette newspaper.
  - 1904 W.H. Morgan Barn, east of House. Will contain larger items that can't fit in the museum, not yet open to public.
  - 1920 Peabody Printing Museum, 210 North Walnut Street. The Peabody Printing Museum has a collection of hot type equipment dating from 1870 to 1920.
- Peabody City Park (NRHP):
  - 1881 Fair Floral Exhibition Hall, west of the football field at the top of the hill in the park. The building is unique because of its octagon walls. It is the only remaining fair building and not open to the public.
- 1887 T.B. Townsend Barn, several miles east near U.S. Route 50. It is a three-story, 80 feet by 140 feet, limestone barn, and can easily be seen on the north side of the highway, not open to public. (Note: Carl and Helen Hansen (1990). Townsend Ranch History, 1870–1987. Peabody.)
- 1927 Indian Guide Monument, several miles east near U.S. Route 50. Can be seen from a bluff overlooking the south side of the highway, not open to public.
- 1974 Mennonite Centennial Memorial Monument, south-east corner of Walnut and 1st Streets in the Santa Fe Park. A threshing stone was cut and placed on four sides of this monument.
- Marion Reservoir, approximately 13 miles (21 km) north of Peabody.

== Government ==
The Peabody government consists of a mayor and five council members. The council meets twice a month.

- City Hall, 300 North Walnut Street
- Fire Department, 103 North Sycamore Street
- Police Department and City Shop, 107 East 9th Street.
- U.S. Post Office, 105 West 2nd Street

=== Historical list of mayors ===
Years	Terms	Mayor
2026-Current	1-	Bailey Penner
2025-Current	1-	Kevin Burke
2023-2024	1	Catherine Weems
2022-2023	1-	Lindsay Hutchison
2019-2022	1+	Thomas Spencer
2009-2019	5+	Larry K. Larsen
2007–2008	1	Edmund Slocombe
2005–2006	1	Tom Schmidt
2003–2004	1	Randy Dallke
2001–2002	1	Kevin Ensminger
1998–2001	1+	N.M. Patton
1977–1998	10+	Douglas Porter
1971–1976	3	Guy V. Meirowsky
1967–1970; 1961–1964; 1953–1956	6	John DeForest
1965–1966; 1957–1960	3	Earl Graham
1949–1952	2	Ray Beeton
1941–1948	4	D.M. Ward

Years	Terms	Mayor
1937–1940	2	A.H. Gilfillan
1933–1936	2	Oliver Kornhaus
1931–1932	1	John Willoughby
1928–1930	1+	Herbert H Wehry
1925–1927	1+	L.W. Noble
1923–24; 1916	1+	J.W. Nusbaum
1919–1922	2	Arnold Berns
1917–1918	1	Orlando Jolliffe
1915	<1	H.A. Kobel
1911–1914	2	W.H. Sulphin
1905–1910	3	J.S. Holmberg
1903–1904	2	G.W. Campbell
1902; 1897-1898	3	O.J. Furst
1901	1	D.L. Sammis
1900	*	John Janett
1899–1900	1+	Thomas Osborne

Note: Before 1905, terms were 1 year.

Years	Terms	Mayor
1896; 1891	2	W.M. Irwin
1894–1895	2	A.A. Wheeler
1893	1	W.H. Traver
1892	1	J.M. Bechtel
1890	1	A.H. Smock
1889	*	W.M. Brueser
1889; 1887	1+	F.B. McKercher
1888	1	J.F. Hess
1886	*	I.A. Shriver
1886	<1	G.A. Funk
1884-1885; 1880	3	G.W. Neal
1883	1	D. McKercher
1882	1	F.C. Bush
1881	1	F.H. Kollock
1879	1	Philip P. Weidlein
1878	1	W.H. Prescott

Note: Before 1905, terms were 1 year.

== Education ==
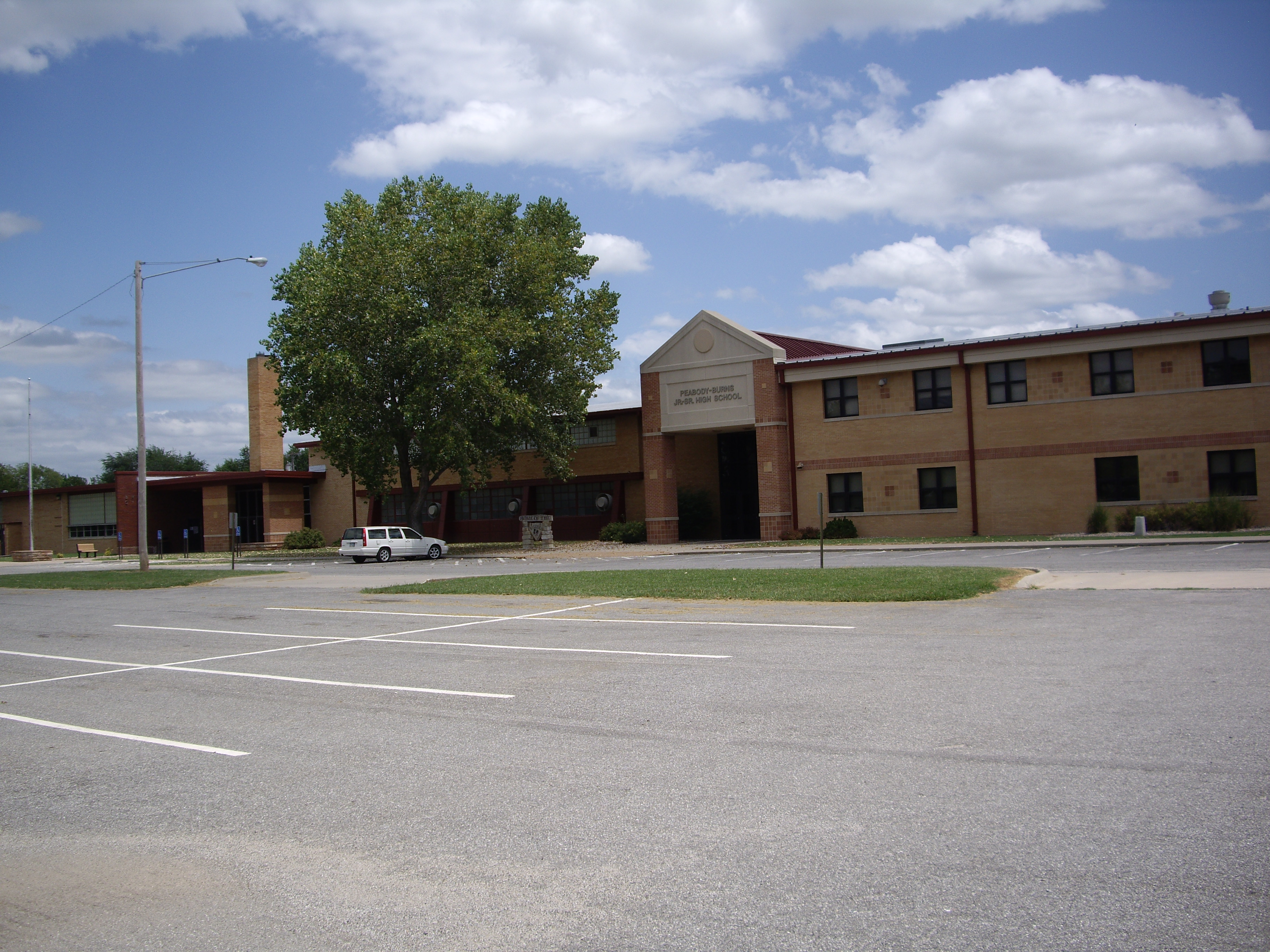
Peabody-Burns Junior/Senior High School (looking north-east in 2010)

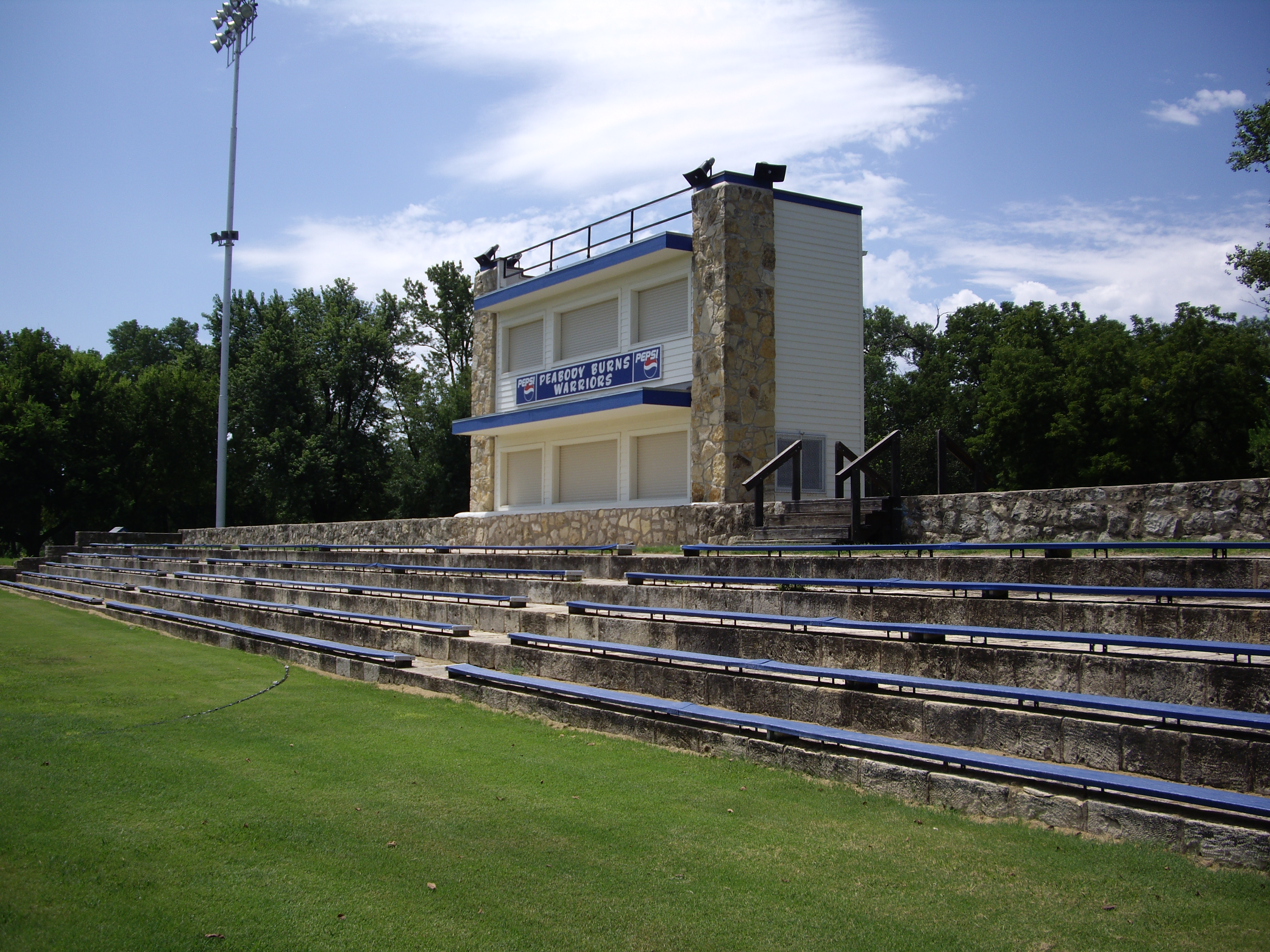
Football Stadium at Peabody City Park (looking south-west in 2010) The limestone bleachers as well as the west and north walls were built in 1938 by the WPA in addition to other park items.

=== Primary and secondary ===
The community is served by Peabody–Burns USD 398 public school district. The school district includes Peabody, Burns, Wonsevu, and nearby rural areas of Marion / Chase / Harvey / Butler Counties. There are two schools in the district in Peabody:

- Peabody-Burns Junior/Senior High School, 810 North Sycamore Street, Grades 6th to 12th
- Peabody-Burns Elementary School, 506 North Elm Street, Grades Pre-K to 5th

==== Academics ====
The high school band is well known in regional competitions and parades. The high school is a member of T.E.E.N., a shared video teaching network which was started in 1993, between five area high schools.

==== Sports ====
The Peabody-Burns High School mascot is the Warrior. All high school athletic and non-athletic competition is overseen by the Kansas State High School Activities Association. For the 2010/2011 seasons, the football team competes as Class 8 Man - Division I in the Wheat State league.

Championships

- 1977, 2nd Place, Class 2A, High School Boys Football, head coach Dennis Franchione
- 1963, 1st Place, Class B, High School Boys Basketball, head coach Cal Reimer

==== History ====
The first school in Peabody was organized in 1871. The first school building, two stone rooms, was built in 1872. The first high school classes were taught in 1879, and the first graduation class in 1881 consisted of 2 students. In 1923, a new high school was built at 900 North Walnut Street. In 1946–1947, the School Reorganization Act consolidated many one-room rural schools into the Peabody school district. In 1953, the Brown Building was built to house a larger gymnasium, band / lunch room, and vocational agriculture rooms. In 1965, the Burns and Summit school districts were unified with Peabody to form Unified School District 398. The Summit school and Burns High School were closed. In 1996–1997, the current high school was built (and attached) to the south side the existing Brown Building at 810 North Sycamore Street. Soon afterward, the former 1923 high school across the street was demolished and converted into a football practice field. The Burns Grade School, which included a junior high, was closed. Currently all students in USD 398 attend schools in Peabody.

=== Library ===
Each USD 398 school has a library for student access.

The city is served by the Peabody Township Carnegie Library at 214 North Walnut Street. The library was established in 1874, a Carnegie library since 1914, was the first free tax-supported library in Kansas. As of 2018, the library has a 50 Mbps fiber optic internet connection; patrons are able to access it with five library computers or free Wi-Fi access using their own device. The library is a member of the North Central Kansas Libraries System, which provides an inter-library book loan service from across the State of Kansas. The library is home to the 1919 "Peabody Roll of Honor" painting that depicts the names of all men from the Peabody Township who served in World War I. It also has a significant meeting room downstairs with a kitchen and is handicap accessible.

== Media ==
=== Print ===
- Peabody Gazette-Bulletin, local newspaper for Burns, Florence, Peabody.
- Hillsboro Free Press, free newspaper for the greater Marion County area.

=== Radio ===
Peabody is served by numerous AM and FM radio stations of the Wichita-Hutchinson listening market area, and satellite radio. See Media in Wichita, Kansas

=== Television ===
Peabody is served by over-the-air ATSC digital TV of the Wichita-Hutchinson viewing market area, cable TV by Allegiance Communications, and satellite TV. See Media in Wichita, Kansas

=== Films ===
- Small Town, USA, a feature documentary which is currently in pre-production, examines the challenges faced by communities, employers, and individuals as they work to develop cultural and economic models that will ensure survival. IMG Pictures filmed in many small towns in rural Kansas, including Peabody. The Peabody downtown is being used for the promotional picture.

== Infrastructure ==
=== Transportation ===
==== Rails ====
Currently two railroads pass through Peabody, BNSF Railway and Union Pacific Railroad. The two railroads cross each other as a Level junction in southwest Peabody, and a rarely used connection between the two railroads allows eastbound BNSF trains to turn onto the northbound Union Pacific railroad.

The BNSF Railway (previously Santa Fe) runs east–west through the city and has a spur for grain cars at the east Mid Kansas Co-Op. Its former depot was located on the north side of the tracks on the east side of Walnut and south of 1st Street was demolished in the 1970s, then its land was converted into the Santa Fe Park. Currently, two Amtrak Southwest Chief passenger trains (east bound & west bound) pass through Peabody during late night hours, but stops at the depot in Newton.

The Oklahoma Kansas Texas (OKT) line of the Union Pacific Railroad (previously Rock Island) runs north–south through the city and has a spur for grain cars at the west Mid Kansas Co-Op. The Kansas City Rocket provided passenger rail service through Peabody on their Mid-Continent Route until at least 1963. Its former depot was located on the east side of the tracks between 1st and 2nd street was demolished in the early 1960s.

==== Roads ====
Currently U.S. Highway 50 passes through the northern edge of the city and follows roughly parallel to the BNSF Railway.

In the early years of the highway before U.S. Route 50 was finalized in the 1930s, the highway was known as the New Santa Fe Trail, which entered the north side of the city on Newell Road (later on Old Mill Road), and exited on the south-western side on 60th Street (known as the Old Trail). In fall 1933, an underpass on 9th street (50S) was constructed to go under the Rock Island Railroad as part of the New Deal highway program during the Great Depression. Until the late 1950s, U.S. Route 50 was split into two routes through central Kansas. The routes were called 50N and 50S, and the highway through Peabody was 50S. From the 1930s to 1998, the highway was routed east to west through Peabody on 9th Street, then a bypass and overpass were built approximately 1.5 blocks north to avoid a dangerous underpass which went under the Union Pacific Railroad.

The Kansas Department of Transportation proposed that U.S. Route 50 should be converted into a four-lane expressway from Emporia to western Kansas. In the meantime, additional passing lanes may be added.

=== Utilities ===
- Internet
  - Cable is provided by Allegiance Communications
  - Wireless is provided by Pixius Communications and various cellular providers
  - Satellite is provided by HughesNet, StarBand, WildBlue.
  - Dialup is provided by AT&T, EarthLink / Southwind, InterKan, KITUSA / Carroll's Web, WWWebservice
- TV
  - Cable is provided by Allegiance Communications
  - Satellite is provided by DirecTV
  - Terrestrial is provided by regional digital TV stations
- Telephone
  - Landline is provided by AT&T
  - Cell Phone is provided by Verizon
- Electricity
  - City is provided by Evergy
  - Rural is provided by RECA and Butler REC
- Natural Gas
  - Service is provided by Atmos Energy
- Water
  - City is provided by City of Peabody
  - Rural is provided by Harvey County Rural Water District #1
- Sewer
  - Service is provided by City of Peabody
- Trash
  - Service is provided by Waste Connections

== Notable people ==
- C. M. Arbuthnot (1852–1920), physician, founder of Arbuthnot Drug Company, Principal at public school in Peabody for two years.
- Warren Bechtel (1872–1933), founder of Bechtel engineering and construction company, graduated from Peabody High School in 1891. In 1925, Warren, his three sons, and his brother Arthur (from Peabody) joined to form the W.A. Bechtel Company, then later became Bechtel Corporation (second largest construction company in USA, as of 2022) (eighth largest private company in USA by revenue, as of 2017).
- Rebecca Ediger (born 1952), United States Secret Service agent, Special Award for Distinguished Service to the Executive Office of the President.
- George Fox (1880–1963), amateur archaeologist, historian, curator, author; was born in Peabody.
- Dennis Franchione (born 1951), head football coach at various colleges, last at Texas State University. Head football coach of Peabody High School from 1976 to 1977 of which his fall 1977 football team placed 2nd in 2A state playoffs.
- Nick Hague (born 1975), NASA astronaut, Colonel in United States Air Force, deployed in Iraq War, test pilot at 416th Flight Test Squadron, teacher at United States Air Force Academy, attended grade school in Peabody.
- Lamar Hoover (1887–1944), head football coach at Fairmount College (now Wichita State University) for four years, head football coach at Oklahoma City University for two years, veteran of World War I, born in Peabody.
- Bertine Pinckney (1824–1909), also spelled Pinckney, Kansas House of Representatives in 1874, Wisconsin State Assembly, Wisconsin Senate, Colonel in Union Army, Postmaster in Peabody starting in 1877, farmer.
- Frederic Remington (1861–1909), American Old West artist, sheep rancher. Many texts describe the location of his ranch near Peabody. In actuality, it was closer to Plum Grove, which didn't have a railroad. He spent free time in both communities.
- Lawrence (L.D.) Slocombe (1905–1972), Kansas House of Representatives from 1956 to 1972, rancher, farmer, businessman.
- Oscar Stauffer (1886–1982), founder of Stauffer Communications, editor of Peabody Gazette-Herald newspaper from 1915 to 1922.
- William Weidlein (1892–1983), aka "Bill", head football coach for Midland College and Fort Hays State University. His uncle, Philip Weidlein, was Mayor of Peabody in 1879.

Fictional

- Kaycee Nicole, fictitious persona, well-known case of Münchausen by Internet from 1999 to 2001.

== Gallery ==
- Historic Images of Peabody, Special Photo Collections at Wichita State University Library
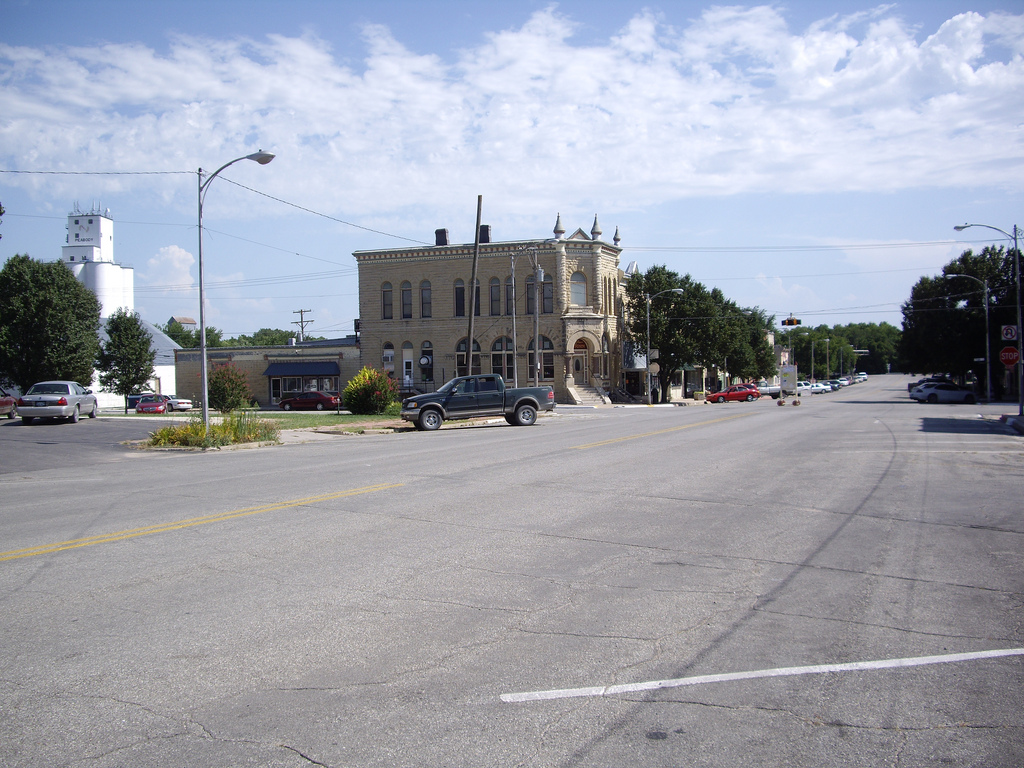
Downtown Peabody (looking south in 2010)

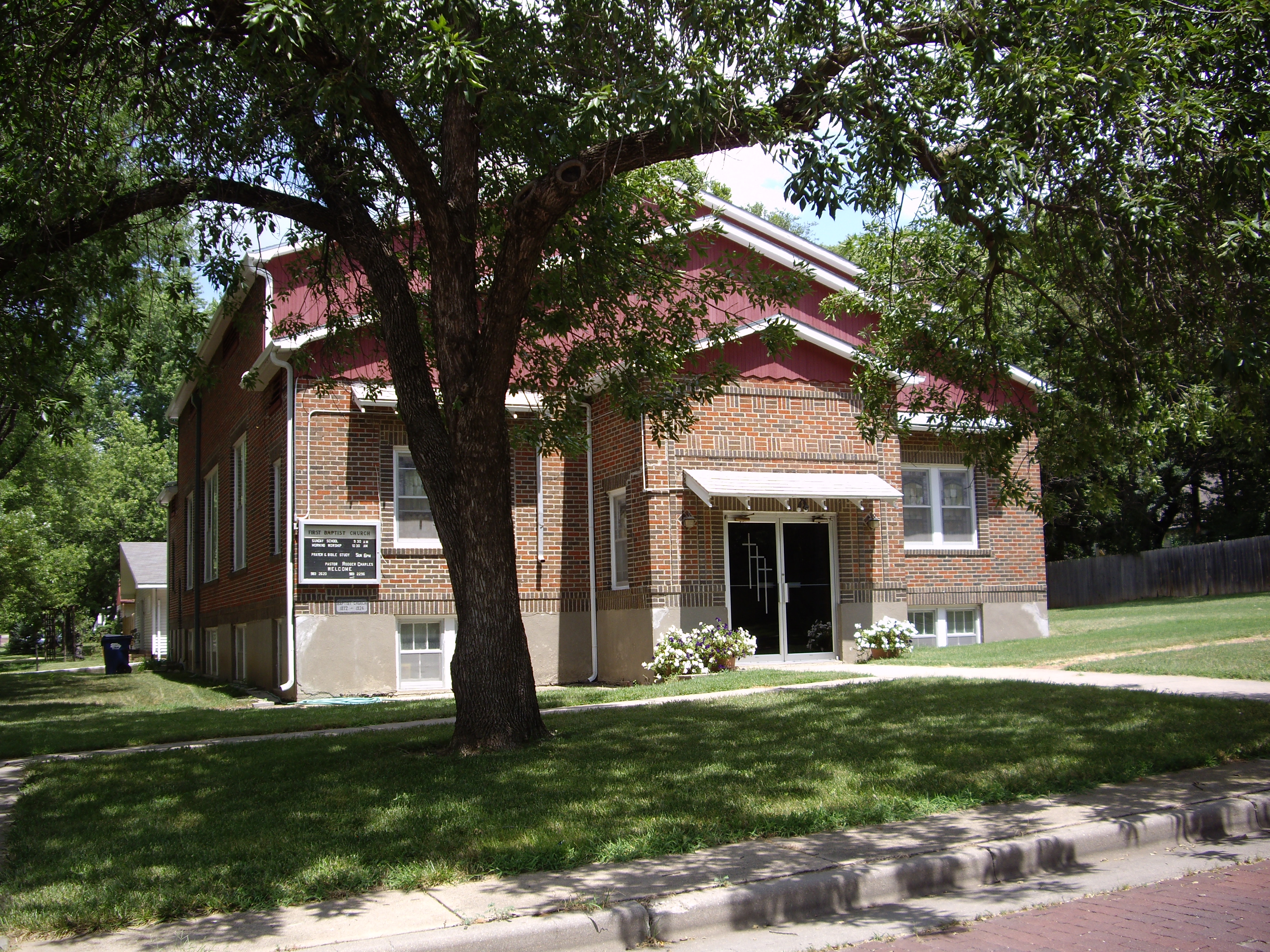
First Baptist Church (looking north in 2010)

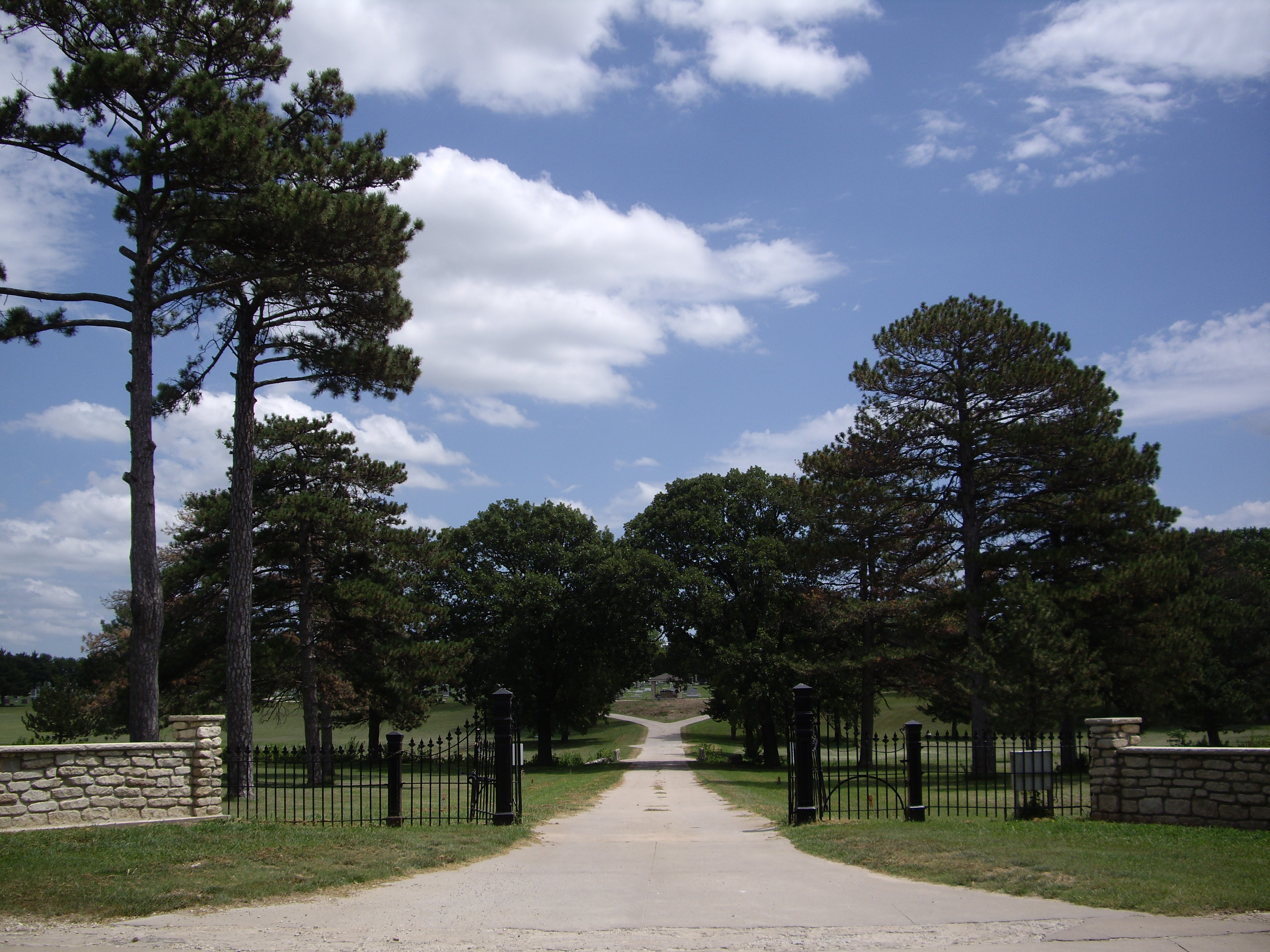
Prairie Lawn Cemetery (looking east), north of U.S. 50 highway on Old Mill Rd (2010)

== See also ==
- Peabody Township, Marion County, Kansas (south of 9th Street in Peabody)
- Catlin Township, Marion County, Kansas (north of 9th Street in Peabody)
- Peabody-Burns Junior/Senior High School
- Main Street Programs in the United States
- List of Grand Army of the Republic posts in Kansas
- National Register of Historic Places listings in Marion County, Kansas
  - Peabody Downtown Historic District
  - Peabody Historical Library Museum
  - Peabody Township Library
  - W.H. Morgan House
  - J.S. Schroeder Building
  - Peabody City Park
- Threshing Stone
- Sunflower Theater
- Historical Maps of Marion County, Kansas
- La Junta Subdivision, branch of the BNSF Railway
- Kaycee Nicole, fictitious persona, well-known case of Münchausen by Internet from 1999 to 2001
