= Rebecca L. Ediger =

- Born: Rebecca Lee Ediger; September 13, 1952 (age 73); Newton, Kansas

Rebecca Lee Ediger (born September 13, 1952) was a former Deputy Assistant Director/Administration, Office of Human Resources and Training, United States Secret Service, United States Department of Homeland Security. Agent Ediger retired after 23 years of service in 2006.

Rebecca Lee Ediger was born in Newton, Kansas. A native of Peabody, Kansas and graduate of Peabody-Burns High School in 1970, Ediger graduated from the Wichita State University Physicians Assistant program in 1976 and received her Bachelor of Health Science degree from Wichita State in 1983.

Ediger was promoted to Deputy Special Agent in Charge of the Presidential Protective Division of the United States Secret Service on January 8, 2001. She was presented the Special Award for Distinguished Service to the Executive Office of the President in 2001, the only time this honor has been bestowed upon a U.S. Secret Service employee.

Ediger served as a consultant for the Clint Eastwood film In the Line of Fire (1993). She has an acting credit in In the Line of Fire: The Ultimate Sacrifice, a making-of featurette that was included on the Special Edition DVD for the film.
