= Kaycee Nicole =

Fictitious cancer-suffering teenager portrayed on the internet by an American woman

- First appearance: 1999
- Last appearance: 2001
- Created by: Kelli Jo Swenson
- Portrayed by: Debbie Swenson

In-universe information
- Alias: Kaycee Nicole Swenson
- Gender: Female
- Occupation: Student
- Nationality: American

Kaycee Nicole, also known as Kaycee Nicole Swenson, was a fictitious persona played by an American woman, Debbie Swenson (born Deborah Marie Dickman in 1960), in an early case of Münchausen by Internet. Between 1999 and when the hoax was discovered in 2001, Swenson, playing the role of Kaycee, represented herself on numerous websites as a teenager suffering from terminal leukemia. Kaycee was reported to have died on May 14, 2001, and her death was publicized on May 16; shortly thereafter, members of the online communities that had supported her unraveled the story and discovered that Kaycee had never actually existed. Debbie Swenson confessed on her blog to the hoax on May 20, 2001.

== Creation ==
In 1998, Debbie Swenson's real daughter, Kelli Burke (born Kelli Jo Swenson in 1985), who was in middle school at the time in Gracemont, Oklahoma, created the online persona of "Kaycee Nicole" with a group of her friends. The group created a webpage for the nonexistent girl and used photos of a high school basketball player from their town to represent her, but do not seem to have played the role of Kaycee beyond that or given her an active persona. That came when Debbie Swenson discovered what the girls had done, and, rather than forcibly discontinue the hoax, she adopted the persona and began playing the role of Kaycee. Around this time, Swenson asked a local family for photos of their teenage daughter from throughout her life, telling them she was going to gift them with a photo collage. The family complied, and the collage was delivered, but Swenson also used the wide range of photos to depict "Kaycee Nicole" at various ages and in various situations in her on-line postings. The family, and the daughter, remained unaware of the use these photos were being put to by Swenson.

In August 1999, the Swenson family moved from Oklahoma to Kansas.

== Persona ==
After it came into Debbie Swenson's possession, the Kaycee Nicole persona appeared on CollegeClub.com in 1999, as a "sunny blonde" teenaged basketball star in Kansas who shared thoughts and photos with others on the website. She made friends easily with both users and staff at the site, even volunteering to help with administrative work and sending gifts to CollegeClub employees. "Kaycee" was interviewed by telephone by The New York Times in 2000, under the name "Kaycee Swenson". She described herself in the resultant article as a high school senior who was taking college courses and planned to start college full-time the next year.

== Blogging, illness, and death ==
I told her I loved her and everything was going to be alright. She was told not to talk or move around. Green, glassy eyes looked at me as blood trickled out of her mouth. The urge to hold her as I had when she was a child was fierce.

— Debbie, blogging about Kaycee during one of her purported hospitalizations

This is much more intricate and involved than anything I've been exposed to.

— John Styn

In 2000, Kaycee revealed to an online friend of hers, Randall van der Woning, that she suffered from leukemia, which was then in remission. Shortly afterward, she told him that the cancer was back. Sympathetic, Van der Woning offered to set up and host a blog for her to chronicle her struggles; Kaycee accepted the offer and the two created "Living Colours" in August 2000.

Kaycee's blog recounted, in sometimes vivid detail, her struggles with the disease, including multiple hospitalizations. The near-daily entries were presented as having been written by Kaycee or, in cases where she was too weak or ill, by her "mother", Debbie. She maintained an upbeat writing style despite her apparent hardships – her first entry said, "I'm beginning a new exciting journey ... into my survival. I want to win! I'll fight to the finish!" and readers of her blog became devoted to the inspirational young girl. Readership of the blog became widespread, with millions of readers visiting the site in the two years it was active and many readers recommending the blog to their own social networks. Some sent cards, gifts, and well-wishes to Kaycee by mail; still others spoke to "Kaycee" on the phone, some, such as the administrator of her blog, many times.

In April 2001, it was revealed that Kaycee's liver was failing. Concerned about losing a "friend" without ever having met her, Van der Woning insisted that Kaycee allow him to visit her; Kaycee told him that he was welcome to visit, but not until after she returned from a trip she would be taking to see the ocean.

However, before Van der Woning could make his trip to see Kaycee, he received a call on May 15, 2001, from Kaycee's mother. Sobbing, Debbie informed him that Kaycee had died, unexpectedly, of an aneurysm the day before. News of Kaycee's death was immediately posted on her blog:

Thank you for the love, the joy, the laughter and the tears. We shall love you always and forever. Kaycee Nicole passed away May 14, 2001, at the age of 19.

Readers of the blog mourned Kaycee's death, many posting obituaries on their own blogs, and news of her loss became widespread and much-discussed throughout the internet.

== Unraveling of hoax ==
After Kaycee's "death", mourners who requested an address to send condolence gifts, cards, or flowers to were told that, despite previous acceptance of gifts by Kaycee, there was no longer a post-office box mailing address for her in Newton, Kansas. Debbie Swenson also informed Van der Woning when she told him of her death that there had already been a memorial service and Kaycee had been cremated.

On May 17, blogger Saundra Mitchell posted an entry to her blog mocking people who faked illnesses on the internet. Though she did not initially name Kaycee Nicole, the next day she published another commentary which did explicitly name her and suggested that in fact, Kaycee Nicole had never existed. She cited the nearly impossible haste with which Kaycee had been interred, noting that even if Kaycee had not been autopsied – which was dependent upon the manner of her death and whether there was a doctor attending – the two days that Debbie claimed that gathering of mourners, memorial service, and cremation had been accomplished in was unlikely; Mitchell also noted a number of inconsistencies in the backstory about Kaycee's cancer. Mitchell, working off Kaycee's IP address, traced the girl's location to Peabody, Kansas. She called around the town, asking if anyone knew of someone of Kaycee's description who had died recently. No one did.

On May 18, a user on the weblog MetaFilter posted a thread entitled "Is it possible that Kaycee did not exist?", which posited, largely on the basis of Saundra Mitchell's writings, that Kaycee Nicole might have been a hoax. Commenters in the often-heated thread (even the creator of the thread stated that "I mean, I want it NOT to be true. I hate the thought that a bunch of people are grieving over somebody who did not existi! [sic]") made a number of observations about the story of Kaycee, among them that no one had ever met Kaycee in person – not even the internet denizens who had been closest to her – and that no obituary was available in a newspaper, anywhere, for a 19-year-old girl named Kaycee Nicole.

As the MetaFilter thread progressed, users discovered that Kaycee's CollegeClub account was tied to the CollegeClub account of Debbie Swenson's teenaged daughter and that records showed that someone had logged into Kaycee's account days after she was supposed to have died. A user investigated the photographs that Kaycee had shared on her blog, identified a school mascot pictured, and traced it back to a particular high school, then traced the jersey number that "Kaycee" was wearing to an actual player. Investigation of the player showed that the only connection she had to Kaycee Nicole was that her family had once been acquainted with the Swenson family; she was not ill, was not named Kaycee Nicole, and not aware that her photo was being used by someone else.

=== Confession ===
On May 19, Debbie Swenson placed a call to her biggest supporter, Randall van der Woning. She told him that Kaycee had not actually been her own child, but rather a foster daughter. She requested that he keep Kaycee's identity secret. Van der Woning did as requested and kept the information to himself; however, this had the side effect of allowing the MetaFilter investigation to continue. As more and more evidence mounted that the story of Kaycee had been cobbled together using misdirection and borrowed facts, Swenson emailed the truth to him, and he, in turn, posted it to the In Living Colours blog on May 20: Kaycee Nicole had never existed. "I didn't know the reactions would be so strong," Swenson said. "I knew it was wrong and every day it ate at me and I couldn't take it." She now claimed that Kaycee was a composite of three people she had known with cancer, none of whom were her daughter.

== Aftermath ==
Internet anger at the hoax was swift, with Van der Woning and many other supporters disclaiming Kaycee and Debbie Swenson. The local police in Peabody, Kansas, were notified and soon handed off the case to the FBI as a possible fraud. The FBI declined to further investigate after its initial acceptance of the case, stating that it had not been able to find evidence that Debbie Swenson's accepting of gifts for "Kaycee" constituted a dollar amount above their threshold for financial crimes.

Swenson was apologetic for the hoax but said that she believed the Kaycee character had also done some good. "A lot of people have problems," she told The New York Times. "I know I helped a lot of people in a lot of different ways."

== See also ==
- Internet hoax
- Law & Order: Criminal Intent (season 1) (the story for "Faith", the next-to-last episode of the season, was drawn from the Kaycee Nicole case)
- Victim playing
