= Wonsevu, Kansas =

Unincorporated community in Chase County, Kansas

- Unincorporated community
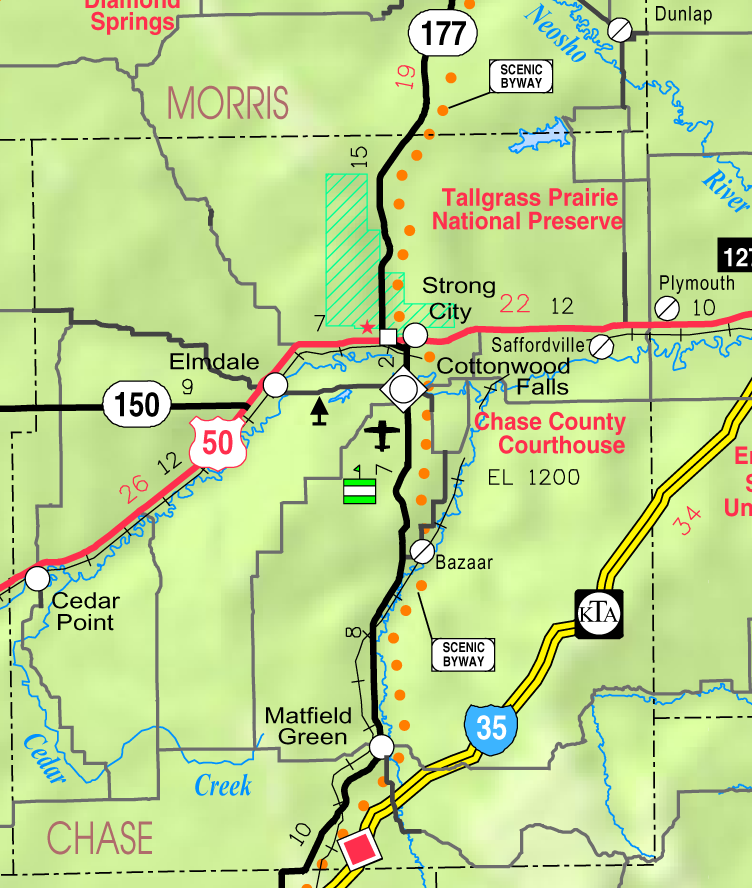
- KDOT map of Chase County (legend)

- Location within Kansas Location within the United States
- Coordinates: 38°9′3″N 96°46′20″W
- Country: United States
- State: Kansas
- County: Chase
- Township: Cedar
- Elevation: 1,352 ft (412 m)
- Time zone: UTC-6 (CST)
  - Summer (DST): UTC-5 (CDT)
- Area code: 620
- FIPS code: 20-80325
- GNIS ID: 477793

Wonsevu is an unincorporated community in southwestern Chase County, Kansas, United States. It is located at the intersection of Cedar Creek and E Roads, which is 4.5 miles (7.2 km) north of the Chase-Butler county line and 3.75 miles (6.04 km) east of the Chase-Marion county line in the Flint Hills.

== History ==
=== Early history ===
For many millennia, the Great Plains of North America was inhabited by nomadic Native Americans. From the 16th century to 18th century, the Kingdom of France claimed ownership of large parts of North America. In 1762, after the French and Indian War, France secretly ceded New France to Spain, per the Treaty of Fontainebleau.

=== 19th century ===
In 1802, Spain returned most of the land to France. In 1803, most of the land for modern day Kansas was acquired by the United States from France as part of the 828,000 square mile Louisiana Purchase for 2.83 cents per acre.

In 1854, the Kansas Territory was organized, then in 1861 Kansas became the 34th U.S. state. In 1859, Chase County was established within the Kansas Territory, which included the land for modern day Wonsevu.

A post office existed in Wonsevu from August 23, 1875 to October 15, 1907.

=== 21st century ===
The town today is almost a ghost town, with only a vacant church, school, two vacant houses, and several ruins left.

== Geography ==
Wonsevu is located at 38°9′3″N 96°46′20″W (38.1508506, -96.7722418), in the scenic Flint Hills of the Great Plains.

=== Climate ===
The climate in this area is characterized by hot, humid summers and generally mild to cool winters. According to the Köppen Climate Classification system, Wonsevu has a humid subtropical climate, abbreviated "Cfa" on climate maps.

== Education ==
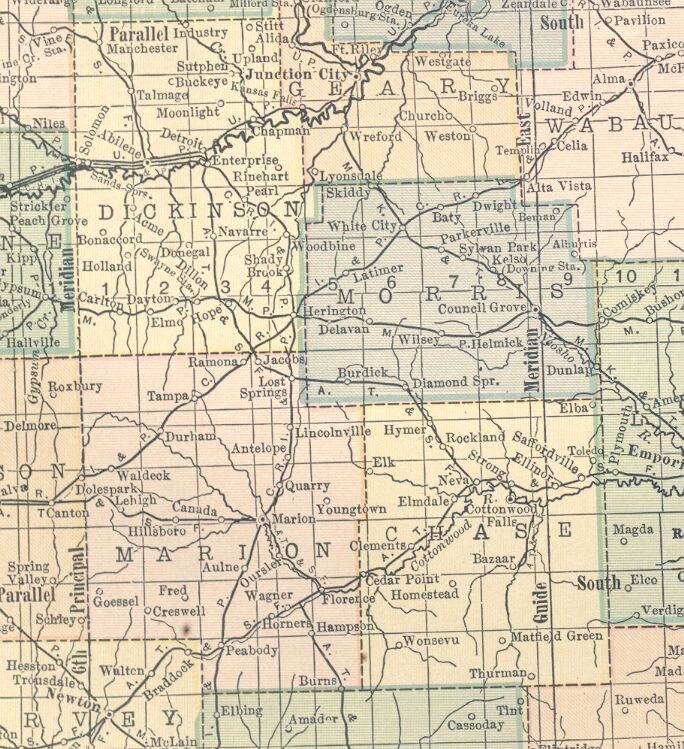
1914 Regional Railroad Map

Wonsevu is served by Peabody–Burns USD 398 public school district. All students attend schools in Peabody at two schools:

- Peabody-Burns Junior/Senior High School, located in Peabody.
- Peabody-Burns Elementary School, located in Peabody.

== Media ==
=== Print ===
- Peabody Gazette-Bulletin, local newspaper for Burns, Florence, Peabody.
- The El Dorado Times, regional newspaper from El Dorado.
- The Newton Kansan, regional newspaper from Newton.

== Infrastructure ==
=== Utilities ===
- Internet
  - Satellite Internet is provided by HughesNet, StarBand, WildBlue.
- TV
  - Satellite TV is provided by DirecTV, Dish Network.
  - Free over-the-air ATSC digital TV.

== See also ==
- Cedar Township, Chase County, Kansas
