= George R. Fox =

American archaeologist, historian, curator, and author

- Born: May 18, 1880; Peabody, Kansas
- Died: June 3, 1963 (aged 83)

George Randall Fox (May 18, 1880 - June 3, 1963) was an American amateur archaeologist, historian, curator, and author. His early research focused on indigenous groups, while his later research and work primarily focused on Cass County, Michigan. He conducted additional archaeological research around the U.S. states of Wisconsin and Michigan, including at Little Lake Butte des Morts and Isle Royale.

== Life ==
George R. Fox was born to John W. and Viola P. Fox on May 18, 1880 in Peabody, Kansas. Fox grew up in Wisconsin, where he later worked in a post office. However, his passion for archeology and writing led him to collect indigenous artifacts as he explored Wisconsin around 1900. He spent his free time traveling and exploring archeological sites in the United States, Mexico, and the Galapagos Islands. During this time he conducted amateur anthropological work such as a survey of Little Lake Butte des Morts in search of a Sauk and Meskwaki village site. In 1917, he served as the curator for the Chamberlain Museum (which would later help form the core of the Michigan State University Museum) in Three Oaks, Michigan for several months.

After leaving his position, he worked with the Nebraska Historical Museum until returning to his curatorial position with the Chamberlain Museum which he held until 1930. While director of the Chamberlain Museum, he would continue his research and wider involvement with his field such as with his appointment as president of the Michigan-Indiana Museums Association in 1927. He would also serve as director for the Edward K. Warren Foundation in Three Oaks. In 1930, he left his position to run a boys camp in Ontario, Canada for three years. Afterwards, he moved to Cass County, Michigan to work for the city of Dowagiac. He also founded a local historical society and wrote for several local papers.

Fox was an active member of several archeological organizations including the Michigan Archaeological Society and the Central States Branch of the American Anthropological Association with whom he served as secretary-treasurer. He worked with and advocated for other amateur archeologists in his field such as William Niven whom he supported in his effort to get his manuscript "Buried Cities of Mexico" published with Dorrance Publishing Company. Fox published many works in The Wisconsin Archaeologist, Michigan History Magazine, and The Totem Pole (a publication of the Aboriginal Research Club of Detroit).

== Personal life ==
George R. Fox was married to Hope Enid Fox (nee Rae Peasley), with whom he had five children. He divorced his first wife around 1930. He later married his second wife, Emily Johnson Fox, in Cass County, Michigan. He continued to live on his second wife's farm following her death until 1962. In 1963, he was moved to Kalamazoo, Michigan due to ill health until his death on June 3, 1963.

== Awards and honors ==
- Lapham Medal, Wisconsin Archaeological Society, 1926
- Distinguished Service Award, Michigan Archaeological Society, 1960

== Works ==
Fox published many works including articles in newspapers (Dowagiac Daily News and The Acorn) and manuscripts in archeological journals. He additionally presented papers at conferences such as the forty-fourth Wisconsin Academy of Sciences, Arts and Letters conference in Milwaukee.

- The Ancient Copper Workings on Isle Royale; Wisconsin Archeological Society, 1911
- "Cairns and Garden Beds in Winnebago County"; paper presented at Wisconsin Academy of Sciences, Arts, and Letters conference, 1914.
- "A minor mystery of Michigan archeology"; Michigan History Magazine, 1920.
- The Fangs of the Serpent; Minton, Balch & Co., 1924
- "The Niven Tablets of Azcapotzalco"; paper presented at American Anthropological Association Central Section annual meeting, 1926.
- An Audit of the Scenic, Historical and Recreational Facilities of Cass County and Dowagiac, Michigan : A Factual History of the Dowagiac Region and Cass County, Michigan; Chamber of Commerce of Dowagiac, 1941
- The Magic That is Cass County, 1958
