= Leavenworth Normal School =

Former teacher's college in Kansas

Leavenworth Normal School located in Leavenworth, Kansas was a state-funded normal school operated by the Kansas state government from 1870 until 1876.

Leavenworth Normal began on May 3, 1870, and John Wherrell was named president of the college. by 1874, about 100 students were enrolled including C. M. Arbuthnot. The school also maintained student housing.

Depending upon state aid, the school closed a little after Concordia Normal School which met the same fate. Following the "Miscellaneous appropriations bill of 1876" state normal schools were then consolidated to what is now Emporia State University

== Notable alumni ==
- James H. Brady, eighth Governor of Idaho
