= Lamar Hoover =

American football, basketball, and baseball coach

Biographical details
- Born: February 27, 1887; Peabody, Kansas, U.S.
- Died: December 18, 1944 (aged 57); Muskogee, Oklahoma, U.S.
- Education: Baker University

Coaching career (HC unless noted)

Football
- 1916–1917: Fairmount
- 1921–1922: Fairmount
- 1923–1924: Oklahoma City

Basketball
- 1916–1918: Fairmount
- 1921–1923: Fairmount
- 1923–1925: Oklahoma City

Baseball
- 1917–1919: Fairmount

Head coaching record
- Overall: 20–27–5 (football); 3–2 (baseball)

Chester Lamar Hoover (February 27, 1887 — December 18, 1944) was an American college football, college basketball, and college baseball coach. He served two stints as the head football at Fairmount College—now known as Wichita State University—in Wichita, Kansas, from 1916 and 1917 and again from 1921 to 1922 and as head football coach at Oklahoma City University from 1923 to 1924. Prior to coaching at Fairmount, Hoover attended Baker University, where he was regarded as one of their top athletes. In the 1906–07 basketball season, Hoover, described as "one of the outstanding guards of the midlands", lead the Baker team to an undefeated season, under coach Phog Allen.

Hoover's final season at Fairmont began promisingly but ended with disappointing losses.

Hoover was born in Peabody, Kansas and was a veteran of World War I. Hoover died on December 18, 1944, at Veterans' Hospital in Muskogee, Oklahoma.

== Head coaching record ==
=== Football ===
Year	Team	Overall	Conference	Standing	Bowl/playoffs
Fairmount Wheatshockers (Kansas Collegiate Athletic Conference) (1916–1917)
1916	Fairmount	7–3	7–3	5th	
1917	Fairmount	3–3–2	3–3–2	T–7th	
Fairmount Wheatshockers (Kansas Collegiate Athletic Conference) (1921–1922)
1921	Fairmount	5–2–1	4–2–1	5th	
1922	Fairmount	3–6–1	3–5–1	11th	
Fairmount:		18–14–4	17–13–4		
Oklahoma City Goldbugs (Oklahoma Intercollegiate Conference) (1923–1924)
1923	Oklahoma City	1–5–1			
1924	Oklahoma City	1–8	0–7	10th	
Oklahoma City:		2–13–1			
Total:		20–27–5			
