= Cedar Township, Chase County, Kansas =

Cedar Township
- Township
- Location within Chase County

- Location within the state of Kansas
- Coordinates: 38°09′30″N 096°47′41″W
- Country: United States
- State: Kansas
- County: Chase

Area
  - Total: 54.96 sq mi (142.35 km^{2})
  - Land: 54.84 sq mi (142.04 km^{2})
  - Water: 0.12 sq mi (0.32 km^{2}) 0.22%
- Elevation: 1,319 ft (402 m)

Population (2000)
  - Total: 116
  - Density: 2.1/sq mi (0.8/km^{2})
- GNIS feature ID: 0477800

Cedar Township is a township in Chase County, Kansas, United States. As of the 2000 census, its population was 116.

== Geography ==
Cedar Township covers an area of 54.96 square miles (142.3 km^{2}) and contains no incorporated settlements. The streams of Bills Creek, Brush Creek, Middle Creek and Turkey Creek run through this township.

== Communities ==
The township contains the following settlements:

- Unincorporated community of Wonsevu.

== Cemeteries ==
The township contains the following cemeteries:

- Griffith.
- Wonsevu.

== Transportation ==
Cedar Township contains one airport or landing strip, Clothier Landing Field.
