= Peabody City Park =

- U.S. National Register of Historic Places
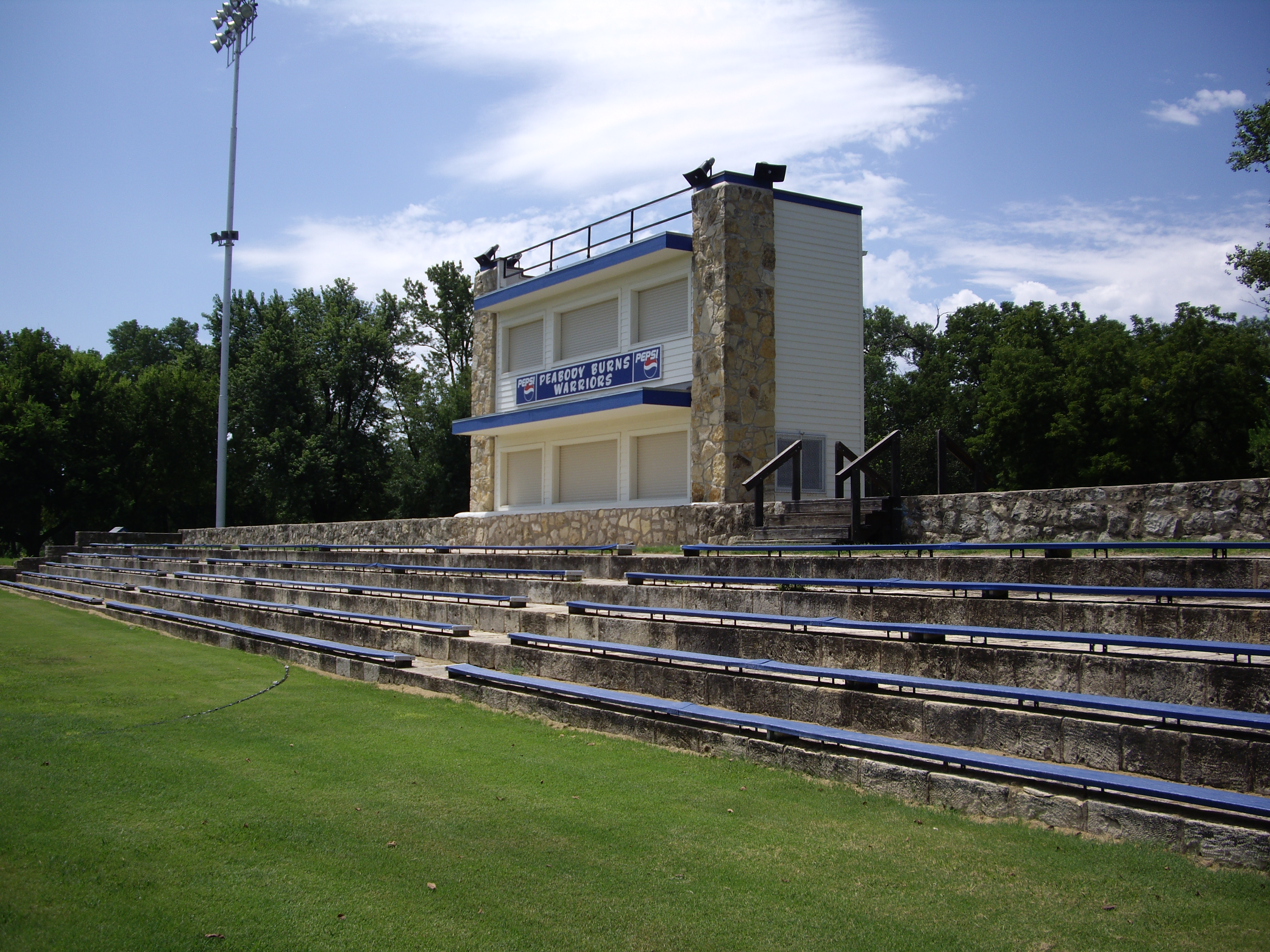
- Football Stadium (looking south-west), 2010. These limestone bleachers were built in 1938 by the WPA.

- Location within Kansas Location within the United States
- Location: Entrance at corner of 2nd and Locust Street; Peabody, Kansas, 66866
- Coordinates: 38°09′58″N 97°06′45″W
- NRHP reference No.: 11001032
- Added to NRHP: January 20, 2012

Peabody City Park was listed on the National Register of Historic Places (NRHP) in 2012, and the sixth NRHP listing in Peabody, Kansas, United States. The park is approximately 3 blocks by 2 blocks in size and located in southwest Peabody.

== History ==
In 1875, the first agricultural "county fair" was held at the current park location. It was held annually for many years by the Marion County Agricultural Society.

In 1881, the Fair Floral Exhibition Hall was built, west of the football field at the top of the hill. The building is unique because of its octagon walls. It is the only remaining fair building and not open to the public.

In September 1885, the Kansas State Fair was held at Peabody during the first four days of the month. An outstanding feature of the state fair was "the First Monument to General Grant", who died shortly before the fair. The temporary monument was an obelisk about 40 feet (12 m) tall, and built from forty bushels of ears of corn. The fair had a grandstand, which could hold 2000 people, to view horse races. The race track was used for a variety of events, including horse walking teams in harness, trotting, running, pacing, mule racing, and daily chariot races. A dining hall was built that was capable of feeding 10,000 people each day.

Peabody was the home of famous race horses around the turn of the century. Three of the more famous horses were world champions. Joe Young (known as the "iron horse") sold for $10,000 by C.E. Westbrook, the first horse west of the Mississippi River to sell for such a high price. Joe Young sired Joe Patchen in 1889, who earned his owner $40,000 in race purses and then was sold for $44,000. Joe Patchen sired Dan Patch in 1896, a horse that sold in 1907 for $60,000. Other famous local racing horses included trotters McKinney, and Silver Sign. Silverthorne toured Austria where he competed for three years against the best race horses in Europe.

In 1900, the Marion County Agricultural Society sold the fair grounds to the city of Peabody, which renamed it the Peabody City Park.

In 1938, the Works Progress Administration (WPA) built the football stadium limestone bleachers, west and north walls, picnic tables, fire pits, and various items in the park.

In 1950 through 1960, the high school boys baseball (Class B) state tournaments were held at the baseball diamond.

In 1960s and 1970s, up to 30,000 or more people attended the Independence Day Celebration on July 4 at the park, including a Carnival of rides.

In November 1977, the high school boys football (Class 2A) state final was held at the park. Beloit took 1st place and Peabody took 2nd Place. It is also notable because the Peabody head coach was Dennis Franchione.

In July 2011, will mark the 90th year of fireworks at the park. The fireworks are infamous for the ending display named Battle of New Orleans, which explodes over 1 Million individual items.

In January 2012, the park was listed on the National Register of Historic Places.

== Current ==
The park has a playground equipment area. There are picnic tables and shelters located throughout the park. It is open to the public as weather permits.

It has the following sports facilities:

- Football field. The Peabody-Burns High School football team plays their home games here each fall.
- Baseball field. Open year around as weather permits.
- Outdoor swimming pool. Open approximately memorial day to labor day.

== See also ==
- National Register of Historic Places listings in Marion County, Kansas
  - Peabody Downtown Historic District
  - Peabody Historical Library Museum
  - Peabody Township Library
  - W.H. Morgan House
  - J.S. Schroeder Building
- Works Progress Administration (WPA)
