= Charles Mertz Arbuthnot =

American physician

- Born: Charles Mertz Arbuthnot; 15 December 1852; Allegheny County, Pennsylvania
- Died: 2 October 1920 (aged 67); Belleville, Kansas

Charles Mertz "C. M." Arbuthnot was an early physician, pharmacist and founder of the Arbuthnot Drug Company in Republic County, Kansas, one of the first to establish a practice in the county.

== Biography ==
He was born in Allegheny County, Pennsylvania in 1852, and his family came to Kansas in 1871 by way of Iowa.

While he was young, Arbuthnot remained at home helping his father on the family farm while also teaching in the district schools until 1875. He then attended Leavenworth Normal School, then a principal at public school in Peabody, Kansas for two years.

While working through his education and teaching, Arbuthnot had been studying medical books. In 1878 he went to Philadelphia and took a medical course at Jefferson Medical College. After graduating in 1881 he returned to Republic County and began practicing medicine in Belleville.
