= Catlin Township, Kansas =

Catlin Township Marion County, Kansas
- Township
- Location within Marion County

- Location within the state of Kansas
- Coordinates: 38.2176313°N 97.0973753°W
- Country: United States
- State: Kansas
- County: Marion

Area
  - Total: 36 sq mi (93 km^{2})

Dimensions
  - Length: 6.0 mi (9.7 km)
  - Width: 6.0 mi (9.7 km)
- Elevation: 1,414 ft (431 m)

Population (2020)
  - Total: 175
  - Density: 4.9/sq mi (1.9/km^{2})
- Time zone: UTC-6 (CST)
  - Summer (DST): UTC-5 (CDT)
- Area code: 620
- FIPS code: 20-11075
- GNIS ID: 477361
- Website: County website

Catlin Township is a township in Marion County, Kansas, United States. As of the 2020 census, the township population was 175, including a fraction of the city of Peabody.

== Geography ==
Catlin Township covers an area of 36 square miles (93.2 km^{2}).

== Communities ==
The township contains the following settlements:

- City of Peabody (north of 9th Street). The majority of Peabody is located in Peabody Township.

== Cemeteries ==
The township contains the following cemeteries:

- Catlin Mennonite Church Cemetery, located in Section 17 T21S R3E. The church was closed in 1961 then demolished in the 1960s.
- Prairie Lawn Cemetery (aka Brookdell Cemetery), located in Section 34 T21S R3E. Main cemetery for city of Peabody.
- Tharp Cemetery, located in Section 2 T21S R3E.

== Transportation ==
U.S. Route 50 passes along the southern edge of the township, following a path roughly parallel to the BNSF Railway.

== See also ==
- Hamilton family
