= Burns Union School =

- U.S. National Register of Historic Places
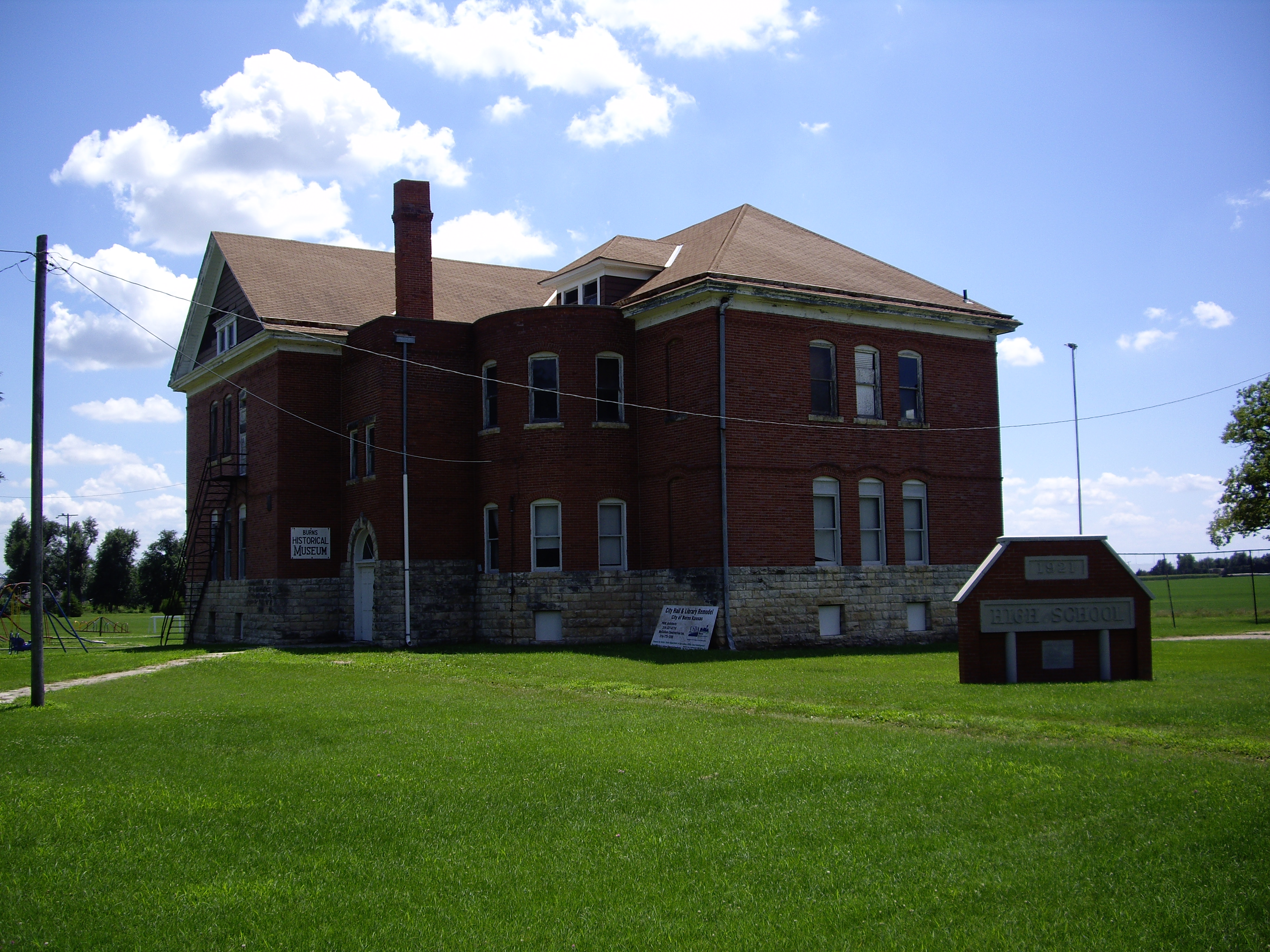
- Currently Burns Community Museum in 2010

- Location within Kansas
- Location: SW corner of Ohio and Main St; Burns, Kansas 66840
- Coordinates: 38°5′20″N 96°53′14″W
- Area: 1.5 acres (0.61 ha)
- Built: 1904
- Architect: Charles W. Squires, J.J. Clayton
- Architectural style: Renaissance
- NRHP reference No.: 75000714
- Added to NRHP: March 26, 1975

The Burns Union School at the SW corner of Ohio and Main Sts. in Burns, Kansas was built in 1904. It was a work of C.W. Squires and J.J. Clayton. In 1965, it closed as a result of statewide school district consolidation. It was listed on the National Register of Historic Places in 1975.

The building now houses the Burns Community Museum and includes a restored period classroom. It is open by appointment.

== See also ==
- National Register of Historic Places listings in Marion County, Kansas
