= Concord =

Concord may refer to:

== Meaning "agreement" ==
- Harmony, in music
- Agreement (linguistics), a change in the form of a word depending on grammatical features of other words

== Arts and media ==
- Concord (video game), a defunct 2024 first-person shooter game
- Concord Condor, a cartoon character
- Book of Concord of the Lutheran Church
- Piano Sonata No. 2 (Ives), Concord Sonata

== Buildings ==
- Concord (District Heights, Maryland), a historic building listed on the NRHP in Maryland
- Concord (Natchez, Mississippi), a historic mansion built in 1789, burned down in 1901
- Concord Building, in the U.S. city of Portland, Oregon
- Concord Oval, a rugby stadium in New South Wales, Australia
- Concord Resort Hotel, a former hotel and resort in the Catskills, New York
- Temple of Concord in ancient Rome, dedicated to the goddess Concordia

== Businesses and organizations ==
- CONCORD, the Confederation for Relief and Development (Europe)
- Concord, a private label of Walmart for bicycles, ebikes, and related accessories
- Concord Camera Corporation, a manufacturer of cameras and other digital products
- Concord Coalition, a US political group
- Concord EFS, Inc., a corporation that merged in 2004 with First Data
- Concord (entertainment company), company that administers sound recording, music publishing and theatrical rights
  - Concord Music Group, predecessor to the current company
    - Concord Records, a U.S. record label
      - Concord Jazz, a subsidiary of Concord Records
- Concord Group, a Bangladeshi conglomerate
- Concord New Energy, an electricity generating company
- Concord Watch Company, based in Biel, Switzerland

== Events ==
- Concord Jazz Festival in Concord, California
- The Battles of Lexington and Concord, Massachusetts, in the American Revolution

== Places ==
=== Australia ===
- Concord, New South Wales
- Concord Parish, Cumberland, New South Wales
- Concord West, New South Wales

=== United States ===
- Concord, Alabama
- Concord, Arkansas
- Concord, California
  - Concord station (BART), a Bay Area Rapid Transit station in Concord, California
  - Concord Naval Weapons Station
- Concord, California, the former name of Orleans Flat, California
- Concord, Delaware
- Concord, Georgia
- Concord, Illinois
- Concord, DeKalb County, Indiana
- Concord, Tippecanoe County, Indiana
- Concord, Kentucky
- Concord, Maine
- Concord, Massachusetts
  - Concord River
  - Concord station (Massachusetts)
- Concord, Michigan
  - Concord Village Historic District (Concord, Michigan)
- Concord, Minnesota
- Concord, Missouri, a census-designated place in St. Louis County
- Concord, Callaway County, Missouri
- Concord, Pemiscot County, Missouri
- Concord, Nebraska
- Concord, New Hampshire, the capital of the state of New Hampshire
- Concord, New York, a town in Erie County
  - Concord (hamlet), New York, within the town of Concord
- Concord, Staten Island, New York, a neighborhood
- Concord, North Carolina
  - Concord Speedway, in Midland, North Carolina
- Concord, Ohio
- Concord, Pennsylvania
- Concord, Tennessee, in Knox County
- Concord, Angelina County, Texas, a ghost town
- Concord, Cherokee County, Texas
- Concord, Leon County, Texas
- Concord, Rusk County, Texas
- Concord, Vermont, a town in Essex County
  - Concord (CDP), Vermont, within the town of Concord
- Concord, Brunswick County, Virginia
- Concord, Campbell County, Virginia
- Concord, Gloucester County, Virginia
- Concord, West Virginia (disambiguation) (several)
- Concord, Wisconsin, a town
  - Concord (community), Wisconsin, an unincorporated community
- Concord Township (disambiguation) (several)

=== Elsewhere ===
- Concord, Sunderland, Tyne and Wear, UK
- Concord, Ontario, Canada
- Concord, New Zealand, a suburb of Dunedin, New Zealand
- Concord Mountains, Antarctica
- Concord Peak, a mountain on the Afghanistan-Tajikistan border

== Schools ==
=== United States ===
- Concord Academy, Massachusetts
- Concord Academy (Memphis), Tennessee
- Concord Elementary School (disambiguation), several schools in the United States
- Concord High School (disambiguation), several in the United States and Australia
- Concord Law School of Kaplan University, Los Angeles, California
- Concord University, Athens, West Virginia, previously called Concord College

=== Elsewhere ===
- Concord High School (disambiguation), several in the United States and Australia
- Concord Primary School, Choa Chu Kang, Singapore
- Concord College, Acton Burnell, Shrewsbury, UK

== Vehicles ==
=== Air ===
- Concorde, Anglo-French supersonic passenger plane, originally spelled Concord in English

=== Land ===
- Concord Coach, a horse-drawn vehicle
- AMC Concord, a compact car
- Kia Concord, a car
- Plymouth Concord, a car

=== Sea ===
- HMS Concord, more than one ship of the British Royal Navy
- USS Concord, more than one United States Navy ship
- Concord (1683), a civilian ship that brought the first German migrants to territory that later became the United States
- Concord (1807 ship), a British merchant and whaling ship, wrecked 1816

== Other uses ==
- Concord grape

== See also ==
- Concorde (disambiguation)
- Concordia (disambiguation)
- Concord Airport (disambiguation)
- Concord Coach (disambiguation)
- Concord Hospital (disambiguation)
- Concord Mall (disambiguation)
- Concord Park (disambiguation)
- Concord station (disambiguation)
- Concordance (disambiguation)
