= Concordia =

Concordia (mythology) is the Roman goddess who embodies agreement in marriage and society.

Concordia may also refer to:

== Businesses and organizations ==
=== Educational institutions ===
- Concordia University
  - Concordia University (disambiguation), for Concordia University, Concordia College and Concordia Seminary
- Concordia Academy (disambiguation)
- Concordia High School (disambiguation)
- Concordia Lutheran High School (disambiguation)
- Concordia International School Shanghai, Pudong, China
- Concordia Junior-Senior High School, Concordia, Kansas
- Concordia Normal School, Kansas (closed 1878)
- Great Western Business and Normal College, or Concordia Normal School and Business College, or Concordia Business College, in Concordia, Kansas, U.S. (closed 1930s)
- Concordia Language Villages, a world-language and culture education program

=== Other businesses and organizations ===
- Concordia Association of Manchukuo, a 1930s–1940s political party
- Concordia Healthcare, now Advanz Pharma, multinational pharmaceutical company
- Concordia Publishing House, LCMS publishing wing
- Concordia Summit, a non-profit organization and annual summit
- Concòrdia, the Catalan name of Concord, an Andorran political party

== People ==
- Charles Concordia (1908–2003), American electrical engineer
- Concordia Antarova (1886–1959), Russian singer
- Concordia Scott (1924–2014), Scottish sculptor and Benedictine nun
- Concordia Selander (1861–1935), Swedish actress and theatre director

== Places ==
=== Africa ===
- Concordia, Northern Cape, South Africa
- Concordia, Western Cape, South Africa

=== Antarctica ===
- Concordia Station, a scientific research station
- Concordia Subglacial Lake

=== Asia ===
- Concordia (Karakoram), a confluence of two glaciers in Pakistan

=== Australasia ===
- Concordia, South Australia, in the Barossa Valley

=== Europe ===
- Concordia, Ede, a windmill in the Netherlands
- Concordia Sagittaria, town and diocesan seat in north-eastern Italy, formerly the Roman city of Iulia Concordia
- Concordia sulla Secchia, Italy

=== Central America ===
- Concordia, Olancho, Honduras

=== North America ===
==== United States ====
- Concordia, Kansas
  - Camp Concordia, World War II prisoner of war camp
- Concordia, Kentucky
- Concordia Parish, Louisiana
- Concordia, Mississippi, ghost town in Bolivar County
- Concordia, Missouri
- Concordia, New Jersey
- Concordia, Portland, Oregon
- Concordia, Texas, unincorporated community, Nueces County
- Concordia, a former name of Walburg, Texas
- Concordia, Saint Croix, U.S. Virgin Islands
- Concordia, Saint John, U.S. Virgin Islands

==== Other places in North America ====
- Concordia (electoral district), Manitoba, Canada
- Concordia Municipality, Sinaloa, Mexico
  - Concordia, Sinaloa
- Concordia, Saint Martin

=== South America ===
- Concordia Bay, Falkland Islands
- Concordia Department, an administrative subdivision of Entre Ríos, Argentina
  - Concordia, Entre Ríos, Argentina
  - Concordia Airport
- Concórdia, Santa Catarina, Brazil
  - Concórdia Airport
- Concordia, Antioquia, Colombia
- Concordia, Magdalena, Colombia
- Puerto Concordia, Colombia

== Ships and boats ==
- Concordia-class cruise ship
  - Costa Concordia, a cruise ship that ran aground and partially sank in 2012
- Concordia (ship) (1992–2010), a barquentine tall ship used for sail training
- Concordia (1696 ship), an early Dutch sailing ship
- Concordia (steamboat), ran on Puget Sound 1930s–1970s
- Concordia yawl, a type of sailing boat

== Sport ==
- Concordia Knurów, Polish football club
- Concordia Piotrków Trybunalski, Polish football club
- CS Concordia Chiajna, Romanian football club
- FC Concordia Basel, Swiss football club, playing in the Challenge League
- FC Concordia Wilhelmsruh, German football club based in Berlin
- HŠK Concordia, Croatian football club (1906–1945)
- SC Concordia von 1907, German football club
- Stadionul Concordia, Concordia Stadium, the home grounds of CS Concordia Chiajna
- SV Concordia Königsberg, East Prussian football club (1911–1945)

== Other uses ==
- Concordia (drink), a Peruvian soft drink brand
- Cunliffe-Owen Concordia, a British 1940s airliner
- Concordia Theatre, in Hinckley, England
- 58 Concordia, a main-belt asteroid
- The Concordian (Montreal), a student newspaper at Concordia University
- Book of Concord, or Concordia, the historic doctrinal standard of the Lutheran Church
- Concordia, a synonym of Euconcordia, an extinct genus of reptiles
- Concordia, alternative name of the Romanian newspaper Românul
- Concordia, the main setting of the video game Mario & Luigi: Brothership
- Concordia, a board game by Mac Gerdts

== See also ==
- Concord (disambiguation)
- Concordance (disambiguation)
- Concorde (disambiguation)
- Concordia Lutheran Church (disambiguation)
- Concordian International School, in Bangkaew, Samutprakarn, Thailand
