= Concord (ship) =

Several vessels have been named Concord:

- Concord (1683) was the ship that in 1683 took the first group of German emigrants to America.
- Concord (1784 ship) was launched at Gravesend in 1784 and initially traded between England and Ireland and then with the West Indies. Between 1786 and 1806 she made 11 voyages as a slave ship in the triangular trade in enslaved people. After her last slave trading voyage, new owners started sailing Concord between the United Kingdom and Newfoundland. She foundered in 1807 while sailing from Portugal to Newfoundland.
- Concord (1807 ship) was launched at Dartmouth in 1807. From then until 1809 she traded widely. Between 1809 and 1812 two different histories emerged. The registers carried her as trading with North America. Other sources, however, have her sailing to the British Southern Whale Fishery as a sealer or whaler. She made three voyages between 1809 and 1816 in this capacity and then returned to trading. She was wrecked at the Cape of Good Hope in November 1816.

== See also ==
- HMS Concord – five ships of the Royal Navy have borne the name Concord, HMS Concord, or the French variant, HMS Concorde
- USS Concord - five ships of the United States Navy have borne the name USS Concord
- French Navy – seven ships of the French Navy have been named Concorde
