= Concordia University (disambiguation) =

Concordia University is a public university in Montreal, Quebec.

Concordia University, College or Seminary may also refer to:

== Canada ==
- Concordia University of Edmonton, in Alberta, formerly Concordia College and Concordia University College of Alberta
- Concordia Lutheran Theological Seminary, in St. Catharines, Ontario, of the Lutheran Church–Canada
- Concordia Lutheran Seminary in Edmonton, Alberta, of the Lutheran Church–Canada

== United States ==
=== Lutheran Church – Missouri Synod ===
- Seminaries of the Lutheran Church – Missouri Synod
  - Concordia Seminary in Clayton, Missouri
  - Concordia Theological Seminary in Fort Wayne, Indiana
  - Concordia Senior College (1953–1977), whose campus is now the Concordia Theological Seminary campus
- California Concordia College (1906–1973), in Oakland, California
- Concordia College (Indiana) (closed 1957), in Fort Wayne
- Concordia College (North Carolina) (closed 1935), in Conover
- Concordia University System
  - Concordia University Ann Arbor, Michigan
  - Concordia University Chicago, Illinois
  - Concordia University Irvine, California
  - Concordia University Nebraska, in Seward
  - Concordia University, St. Paul, Minnesota
  - Concordia University Texas, in Austin
  - Concordia University Wisconsin, in Mequon
  - Concordia College (New York) (closed 2021), in Bronxville
  - Concordia College Alabama (closed 2018), in Selma
  - Concordia University (Oregon) (closed 2020), in Portland
    - Concordia University School of Law (closed 2020), in Boise, Idaho

=== Other institutions in the United States ===
- Concordia College (Moorhead, Minnesota), affiliated with the Evangelical Lutheran Church in America
- Concordia College and University, an unaccredited institution
- Seminex, or Concordia Seminary in Exile (1974–1987), in St. Louis, Missouri
- Union University (New York), designated "Universitas Concordiae" in Latin

== Other countries ==
- Concordia College (South Australia) in Highgate, Adelaide
- Concordia Lutheran College in Toowoomba, Queensland, Australia
- Concordia International University Estonia, in Tallinn
- Concordia College (Namibia), in Windhoek
- Concordia College Manila, Philippines

== See also ==
- Concordia (disambiguation)
- Concordia Academy (disambiguation)
- Concordia High School (disambiguation)
- Concordia Lutheran High School (disambiguation)
- Cloud County Community College in Concordia, Kansas, U.S.
- Concordia Language Villages
- Concordia Normal School (closed 1878)
- Concordian International School, in Bangkaew, Samutprakarn, Thailand
- Great Western Business and Normal College, or Concordia Normal School and Business College, Concordia Business College, in Concordia, Kansas, U.S. (closed 1930s)
