= Concord, Virginia =

Concord, Virginia may refer to:

- Concord, Brunswick County, Virginia
- Concord, Campbell County, Virginia
- Concord, Gloucester County, Virginia

== See also ==
- Concord (disambiguation)
