= Concordia High School =

Concordia High School may refer to:

- Concordia Academy (Austin, Texas)
- Concordia Junior-Senior High School (Kansas)
- Concordia High School (Concordia, Missouri)
- Concordia High School (Edmonton)
- Concordia Lutheran High School (Fort Wayne, Indiana)
- Concordia Lutheran High School (Texas)

== See also ==
- Concordia (disambiguation)
- Concordia Academy (disambiguation)
- Concordia University (disambiguation)
- Cloud County Community College in Concordia, Kansas, U.S.
- Concordia Language Villages
- Concordia Normal School (closed 1878)
- Concordian International School, in Bangkaew, Samutprakarn, Thailand
- Great Western Business and Normal College, or Concordia Normal School and Business College, Concordia Business College, in Concordia, Kansas, U.S. (closed 1930s)
