= De la Concorde =

De la Concorde may refer to:

- De la Concorde station, an intermodal transit station in Laval, Quebec, Canada
- Place de la Concorde, a public park in Paris
- Pont de la Concorde (disambiguation)

== See also ==
- Concorde (disambiguation)
