= Concord High School =

Concord High School or Concord School is the name of several schools in the United States and Australia:

== United States ==
- Concord High School (Arkansas)
- Concord High School (California)
- Concord International High School, former school in Santa Monica, California
- Concord High School (Delaware)
- Concord School (Miccosukee), a historic one-room school in Leon County, Florida
- Concord High School (Indiana), in Elkhart
- Concord-Carlisle High School, Massachusetts
- Concord High School (Concord, Michigan)
- Concord High School (New Hampshire)
- Concord High School (North Carolina)
- Concord School House (Philadelphia), Pennsylvania

== Australia ==
- Concord High School (Sydney)

== See also ==
- Concordia High School (Edmonton), Concordia College and subsequently Concordia College High School until 1997
- Concord Elementary School (disambiguation)
- Concord (disambiguation)
