= Concordia, United States Virgin Islands =

Concordia, United States Virgin Islands may refer to:

- Concordia, Saint Croix, United States Virgin Islands
- Concordia, Saint John, United States Virgin Islands
