= Concord Village Historic District =

Concord Village Historic District may refer to:

- Concord Village Historic District (Concord, Michigan), listed on the NRHP in Michigan
- Concord Village Historic District (Concord, Tennessee), listed on the NRHP in Tennessee
