= Concord Mall =

Concord Mall may refer to:

- Concord Mall (Delaware), a shopping mall in Wilmington, Delaware
- Concord Mall (Indiana), a shopping mall in Elkhart, Indiana
- Concord Mills, a shopping mall in Concord, North Carolina

== See also ==
- Concord (disambiguation)
