= Concord Park (disambiguation) =

Concord Park is a large park in the North of Sheffield, UK.

Concord Park may also refer to:

- Concord Park, Pennsylvania, United States, an intentionally racially integrated residential neighborhood
- Concord Park (Charleston), a public park in South Carolina, United States
- Concord Park Place, Toronto, Canada

== See also ==
- Concord (disambiguation)
