= French frigate Concorde =

French frigate Concorde includes the following ships:

- French frigate Indien (1673), renamed Concorde in 1692
- French frigate Concorde (1755), wrecked 1756
- French frigate Concorde (1777), a Concorde-class frigate captured by the Royal Navy in 1783 and commissioned as HMS Concorde
- French frigate Concorde (1791), a Nymphe-class frigate captured by the Royal Navy in 1800

== See also ==
- Concorde (disambiguation)
