= Operation Concordia =

Operation Concordia may refer to:

- European Union Military Operation in the Republic of Macedonia, also referred to as EUFOR Concordia or Operation Concordia, a 2003 peacekeeping mission
- Operation Concordia (Vietnam War), a 1967 operation during the Vietnam War
- Operation Concordia Square, a 1968 operation during the Vietnam War

== See also ==
- Concordia (disambiguation)
