= Paddock-Hubbard House =

- U.S. National Register of Historic Places
- U.S. Historic district – Contributing property
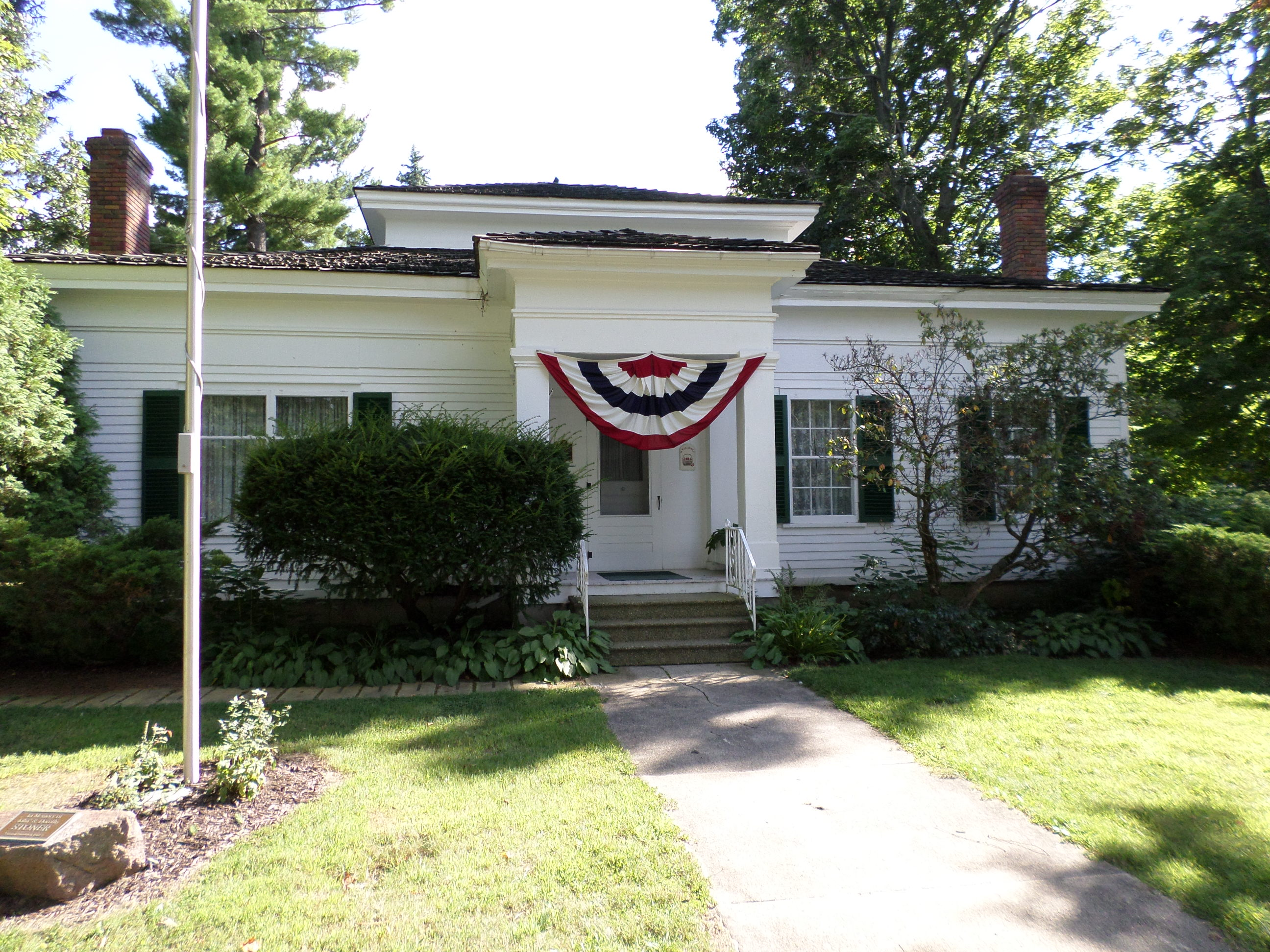
- Interactive map
- Location: 317 Hanover St., Concord, Michigan
- Coordinates: 42°10′39″N 84°38′26″W
- Area: less than one acre
- Built: 1846
- Architectural style: Greek Revival
- Part of: Concord Village Historic District (ID96000810)
- NRHP reference No.: 94001429
- Added to NRHP: December 9, 1994

The Paddock-Hubbard House (now the Hubbard Memorial Museum) was built as a single-family home located at 317 Hanover Street in Concord, Michigan. It was listed on the National Register of Historic Places in 1994.

== History ==
Alfred Paddock was born in Litchfield, New York, in 1805. He worked as a merchant in western New York before moving to Concord in the 1840s and opening a store there. In 1844, he purchased the lot that this house sits on, and likely constructed a small house at that time. In about 1846, he built this larger house, converting the smaller structure into a rear carriage house. Paddock was involved in local politics, serving on the Concord Township Council in 1844, 1846, and 1848. He was elected Concord Township supervisor in 1849, and served in the State Senate in 1853. Paddock lived in this house until his death in 1870, after which the house passed to his son George.

George Paddock occupied the house until 1897. Truman and Cora Piper Hubbard began renting the house in 1897, and purchased it in 1902. Truman Hubbard was also active in local politics, serving on the Concord Village Council from 1918 to 1933. In the 1930s, the Hubbards installed some Colonial modernizations to the house. They lived there until their deaths, Cora in 1953 and Truman in 1954. The house passed to the Hubbards' daughter, Mrs. Charles McFarlane, who occupied the house until her own death. Her sister, Marion Hubbard McFarlane, then moved into in the home. In 1986, Mrs. McFarlane established the Hubbard Memorial Museum Foundation in 1986; after her death in 1991, the foundation converted the house into a museum.

== Description ==
The Paddock-Hubbard House is a 1 1/2-story, wood-framed Greek Revival structure with a hip roof and a fieldstone foundation. A small hip-roofed second story / attic section projects from the middle of the main roof. The house is covered with clapboards. The front facade contains an entry porch with square Tuscan columns, with matching pilasters against the house. A broad architrave and frieze bands run under the cornices. On one side of the front entrance are six-over-six windows. Other windows are Colonial in appearance, likely the result of a 1930s modernization.
