= Concord Coach (disambiguation) =

Concord Coach may refer to:

- Concord Coach Lines, an intercity bus company
- Concord coach, a horse-drawn vehicle often used as a stagecoach

== See also ==
- Concord (disambiguation)
