= Concord Hospital =

Concord Hospital may refer to:

- Concord Repatriation General Hospital in Sydney, Australia
- Concord Hospital (New Hampshire), in the United States

== See also ==
- Concord (disambiguation)
