= Anson Borough Homes =

Populated Place in Charleston County, South Carolina

Anson Borough Homes was a housing complex located in Charleston, South Carolina bounded by Washington, Concord, Calhoun, and Laurens Streets. The project was one of a series of federally funded housing projects built in the 1930s and early 1940s during the Segregation Era. It meant to be used as housing for Black residents and would cost $2.30 per room per month.

Anson Borough Homes - looking south from Calhoun

== Construction ==
The land was condemned by the Charleston Housing Authority; the owner was ultimately awarded $28,000 following a jury trial over the valuation. The project was named in honor of George Anson. Construction by the Artley Co. of Savannah, Georgia began in September 1939 using an interlocking, glazed tile instead of bricks. The United States Housing Authority agreed to transfer the housing project to the Charleston Housing Authority once the construction debt was repaid but in no less than 60 years.

Anson Borough Homes was announced to open about February 1, 1940. The project had 162 units (691 rooms). The project was described as a slum clearance project which removed 120 dwellings. The project cost $701,664. The first residents did not move into the units until Reuben Shears and his family moved in on March 1, 1940; priority was given to residents of the former dwellings that had been demolished for public housing.

== Demolition ==
In 1997, the EPA said that the land was not contaminated with enough pollutants to interfere with its use. City Councilman James Lewis pointed to the fact that the public housing had been closed in part because of a fear of pollutants but that the same land was, once the public housing had been demolished, not a risk. In August 1998, the city received two redevelopment proposals for the land, both of which included an educational component.

The City decided in 2007 to sell much of the land that had been the housing project to East West Cumberland Park Associates for $16 million. The plans would include a hotel and retail space and a limited amount of housing. Concord Park was built on part of the land.

In 2018, oil still seeped from the ground at a rate of 50 to 400 gallons per month.

The demolition of the public housing over environmental concerns before its redevelopment, including a $60 million condominium, has been cited as an example of racial basis and environmental injustice in Charleston.
