= Mann House (Concord, Michigan) =

Historic house in Michigan, United States

- U.S. National Register of Historic Places
- U.S. Historic district – Contributing property
- Michigan State Historic Site
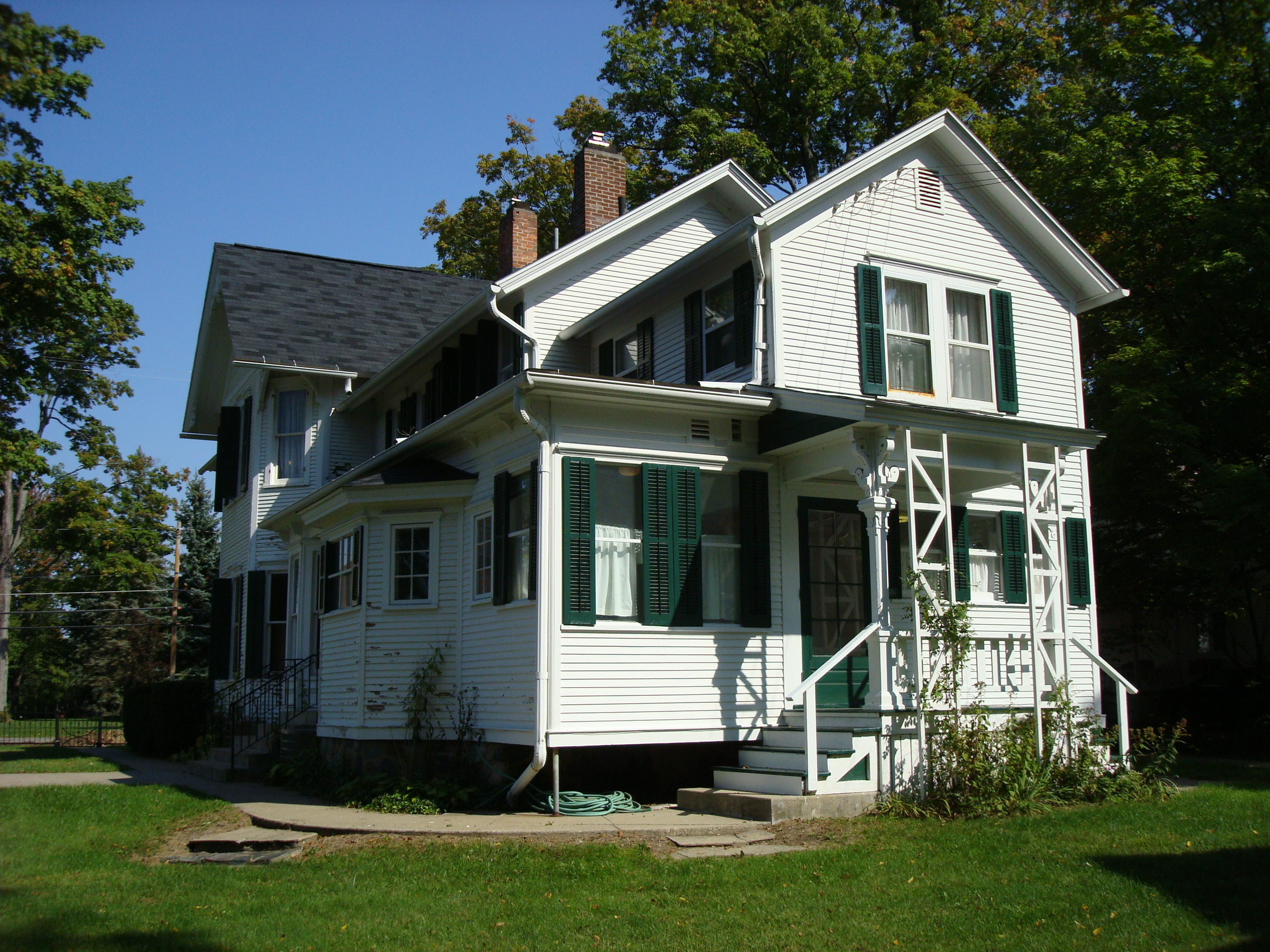
- House in 2008
- Interactive map
- Location: 205 Hanover Street, Concord, Michigan
- Coordinates: 42°10′40″N 84°38′36″W
- Built: 1883
- Architectural style: Late Victorian
- Part of: Concord Village Historic District (ID96000810)
- NRHP reference No.: 70000273

Significant dates
- Added to NRHP: October 15, 1970
- Designated MSHS: June 18, 1970

The Mann House is a historic home located at 205 Hanover Street in Concord, Michigan. It is a Michigan State Historic Site and is listed on the National Register of Historic Places. It has been operated as a museum since 1970.

== History ==
Daniel Sears Mann married Ellen E. Keeler in 1873. The couple lived on a farm outside of Concord. They had three children, one of whom died young. By the 1880s, the Manns felt that a house in town would be advantageous, so that their daughters, Jessie Ellen and Mary Ida, could attend school in Concord. They purchased property, and had constructed this house (1883-1884). As the girls grew older, the house became a social center of the town.

Jessie Ellen Mann completed a degree at the University of Michigan in 1906, and afterward taught mathematics, primarily in Battle Creek schools. She remained living in the house. Around the turn of the century, Mary Ida went to the Philippines as a teacher, and there married. She moved to various locations in the United States with her husband, but often visited Concord. When he died in 1942, Mary Ida moved back to her childhood home.

In 1947, a modern kitchen was installed in the rear of the home. The sisters continued to live in the house until their deaths, Mary Ida died in 1959; Jessie Ellen lived in the house until her death in 1969. Their wills bequeathed the house to the people of Michigan. The Michigan Historical Center has operated it as a museum since 1970. The house was named a Michigan State Historic Site on June 18, 1970, and was listed on the National Register of Historic Places on October 15, 1970. The house is representative of 1880s middle-class household architecture.

== Design ==
The mostly rectangular frame house was designed in the Late Victorian style. The walls are covered in clapboard siding. Above the entrance, at one corner, stands a pyramidal tower. The roof is a cross-gable with a small amount of Eastlake Style trim on the vergeboards, front door, porch and gablets. A carriage house is located behind the house. There are three entrances to the house with porches.

On the interior, the original floor had an entrance hall, parlor, sitting room, dining room, bedroom, kitchen, pantry, and woodshed on the first floor, and five bedrooms on the second floor. The 1947 renovation added a kitchen in the first floor, and the woodshed was converted to a laundry room. The interior houses most of the original furnishings and household implements. The ceilings are plaster and there is a marbleized slate fireplace inside.

== Gallery ==
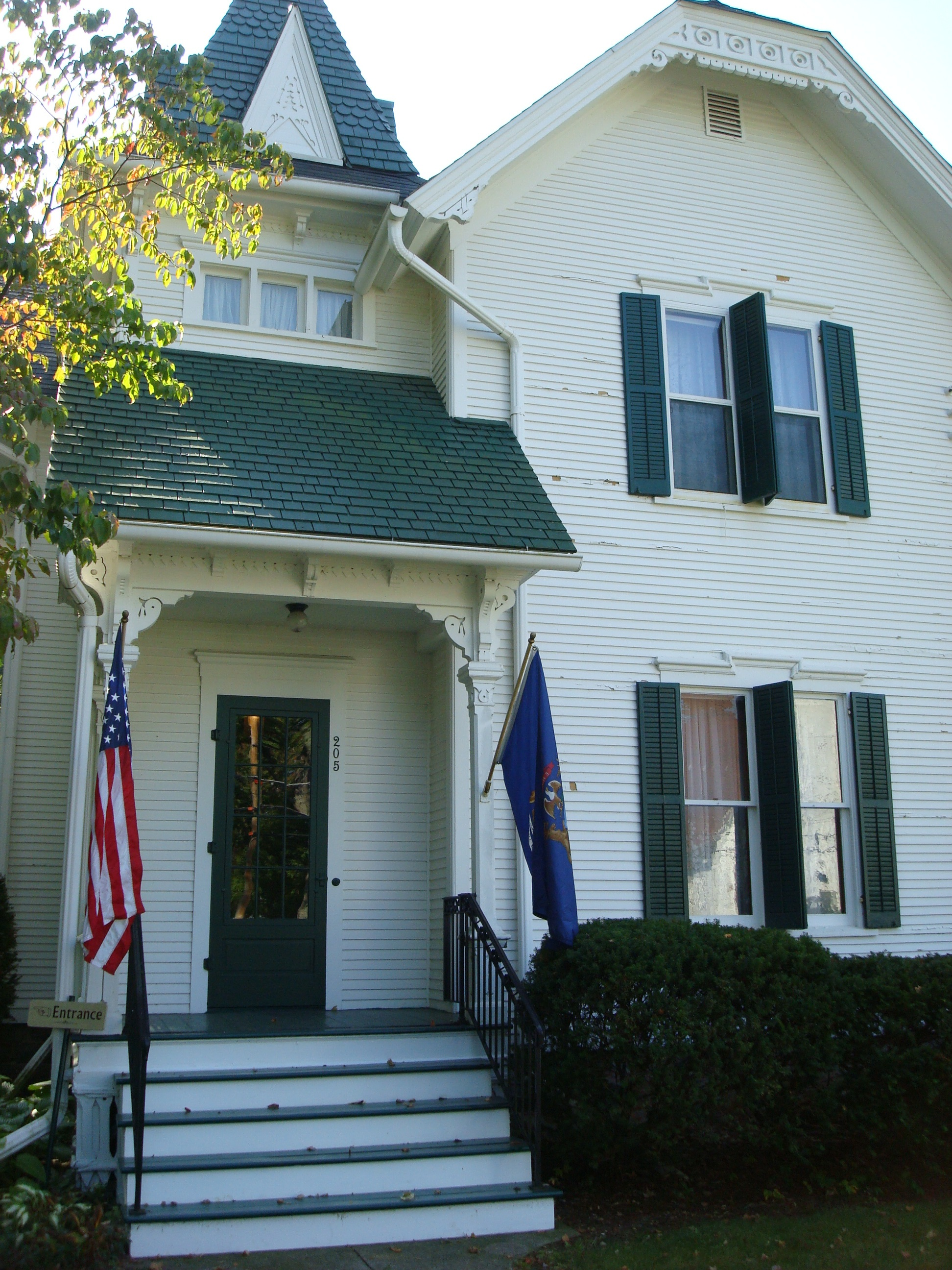
Front of house

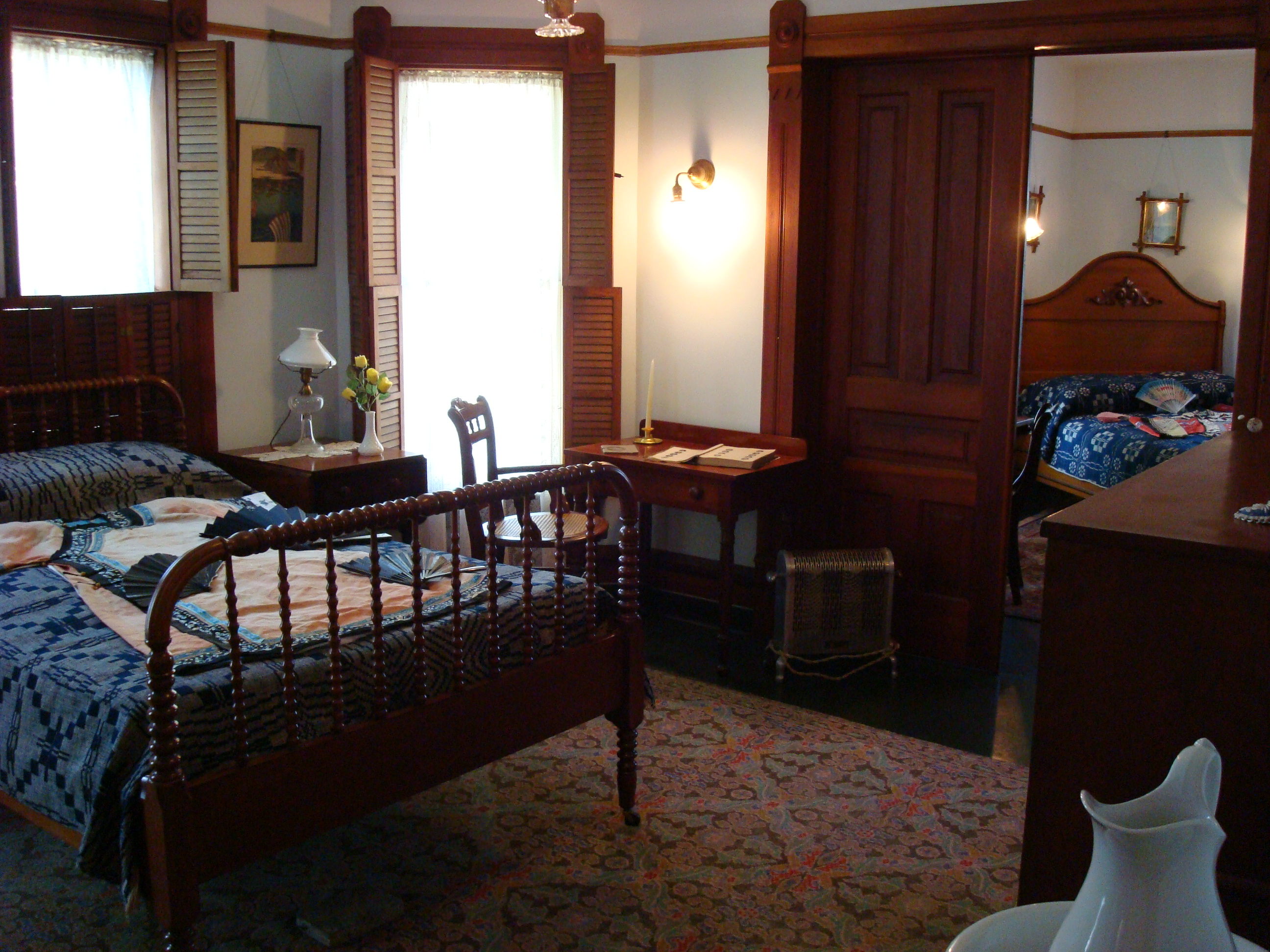
One of the house's bedrooms

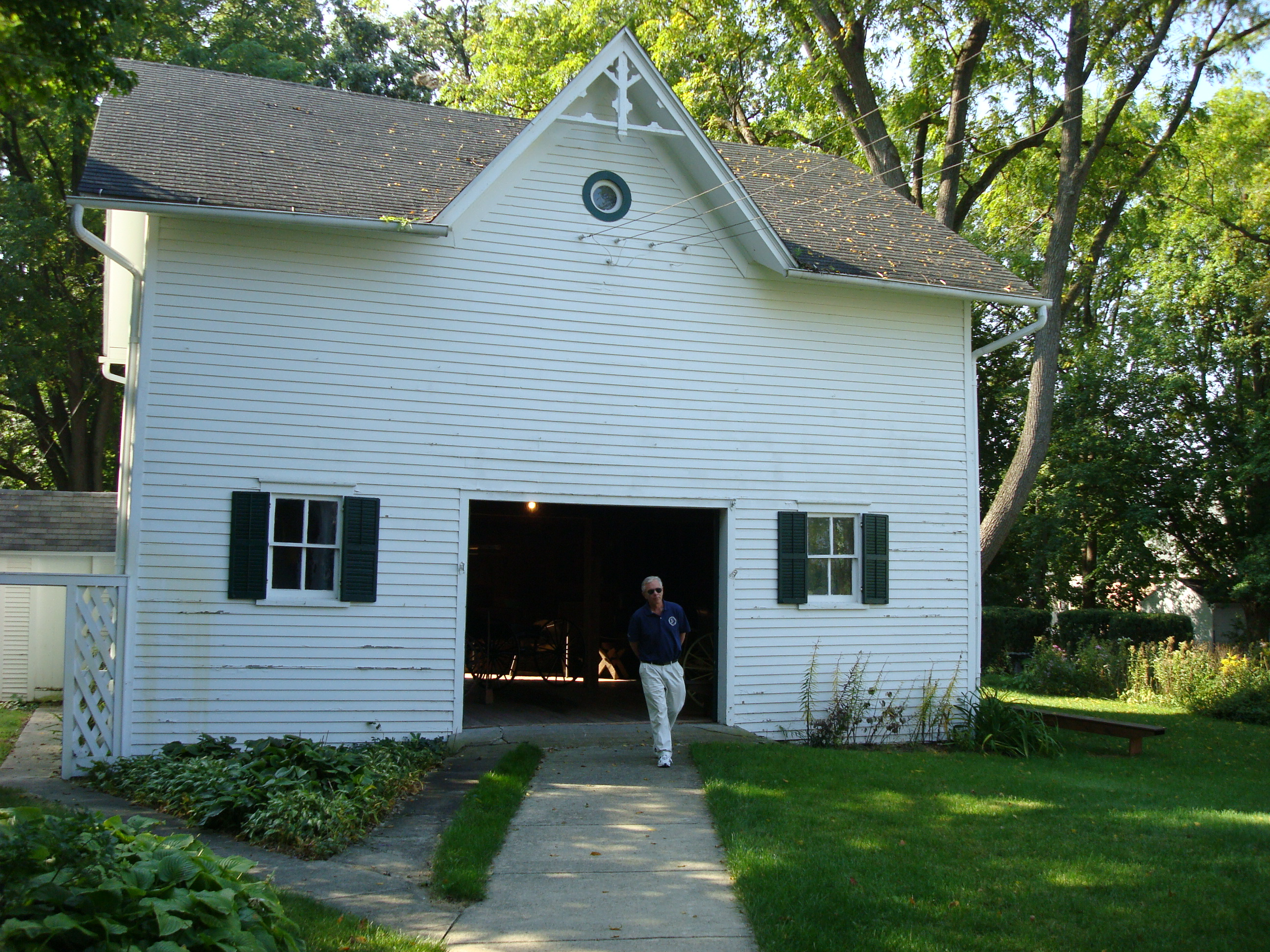
Carriage house

== See also ==
- National Register of Historic Places listings in Jackson County, Michigan
- List of Michigan State Historic Sites in Jackson County, Michigan
