= Concord Airport =

Concord Airport may refer to:

- Buchanan Field Airport in Concord, California, United States (FAA/IATA: CCR)
- Concord Municipal Airport in Concord, New Hampshire, United States (FAA/IATA: CON)
- Concord Regional Airport in Concord, North Carolina, United States (FAA: JQF, IATA:USA)

== See also ==
- Concord (disambiguation)
