= Concord station =

Concord station may refer to:

- Concord station (BART), a Bay Area Rapid Transit station in Concord, California
- Concord station (Massachusetts), a commuter rail station in Concord, Massachusetts
- Concord station (New Hampshire), a former commuter rail station in Concord, New Hampshire
- Concord Naval Weapons Station, a military base in Concord, California

== See also ==
- Concord (disambiguation)
