= Concord Mall (Indiana) =

Shopping mall in Elkhart, Indiana, US (1972–2023)

- Location: Elkhart, Indiana, United States
- Coordinates: 41.643°N 85.933°W
- Address: 3701 South Main Street
- Opened: August 9, 1972
- Closed: October 2023
- Developer: Robert E. Fryling, Inc.
- Owner: Triyar
- Num. of stores: 60 (at peak)
- Num. of anchor tenants: 3 (at peak)
- Floor area: 528,300 sq ft (49,080 m^{2})
- Floors: 1 (2 in former Carson Pirie Scott and JCPenney)
- Public transit: Interurban Trolley

Concord Mall was an enclosed shopping mall serving Elkhart, Indiana, United States. It opened on August 9, 1972, featuring Montgomery Ward and Robertson's as its anchor stores, with JCPenney being added on in 1976. Robertson's was converted to Meis, Elder-Beerman, and Carson's before closing in 2018, while Montgomery Ward was divided between Hobby Lobby and ABC Warehouse. These are also the only two stores open at the mall, which otherwise closed for business in 2023.

== History ==
The Concord Mall opened on August 9, 1972, anchored by Montgomery Ward and Robertson's, a division of Gamble-Skogmo. JCPenney was added as a third anchor in 1976. After Robertson's closed their location in 1985, Meis opened in the space later that year. The Meis store was sold to Elder-Beerman in 1989, which was re-branded as Carson's in 2011. After Montgomery Ward closed, its building was split between Hobby Lobby (which opened in 2002) and ABC Warehouse. In 2008, a space vacated by Osco Drug was renovated into a food court. On January 31, 2018, Carson's parent company, Bon-Ton, announced they would be closing the Concord Mall location.

In January 2023, JCPenney announced that they would be closing their Concord Mall location around May 2023, which left Hobby Lobby as the only anchor left. In October 2023, it was announced that the mall would be closing by the end of the month and will be demolished to make way for future redevelopment plans.

== See also ==
- List of shopping malls in the United States
