= Lucy (1799 ship) =

British slave ship (1799–1806)

History

Great Britain
- Name: Lucy
- Owner: Thomas Hodgson, Jr & Ellis Leckonby Hodgson
- Launched: 1789, Spain
- Acquired: 1799 by purchase of a prize
- Captured: 1806

General characteristics
- Tons burthen: 205, or 206 (bm)

Lucy was a Spanish vessel built in 1789, probably under another name. She came into British ownership in 1799. As Lucy, she proceeded to make three complete voyages as a slave ship in the triangular trade in enslaved people. On the second of these she rather unusually assisted the British commander at Gorée in an operation to destroy a Spanish vessel at Senegal before the French could arm it as a privateer. However, a few days later a slave revolt resulted in the death of Lucy's captain. The French captured Lucy in 1806 on her fourth enslaving voyage as she was approaching the West Indies after she had embarked her captives. The capture involved a single ship action that left most of Lucy's crew dead or wounded. Her captors took Lucy into Guadeloupe, together with her captives.

== Career ==
Lucy first appeared in Lloyd's Register (LR), in 1799.

Year	Master	Owner	Trade	Source
1799	D.Vaughn	Fisher & Co.	Liverpool–Africa	LR

1st voyage transporting enslaved people (1799–1800): Captain Daniel Vaughn sailed from Liverpool on 16 August 1799. In 1799, 156 British vessels left Britain bound on voyages to transport enslaved people; 134 left from Liverpool.

Vaaughn acquired captives in New Calabar and he brought them to Trinidad, where he arrived on 16 May 1800. Lucy sailed from Trinidad for Liverpool on 16 June, and arrived there on 29 August. She had left Liverpool with 31 crew members and had suffered 12 crew deaths on her voyage.

Year	Master	Owner	Trade	Source
1801	D.Vaughn; Olderman	Fisher & Co. Hodgson	Liverpool–Africa	LR

Thomas Hodgson, Jr and his son, Ellis Leckonby Hodgson, the new owners of Lucy, were leading Liverpool slave traders. They maintained a factory at Iles de Los (1790, 1794, & 1799–1809), and at Cape Mount and Bassa (1801–1802).

2nd voyage transporting enslaved people (1801–1802): Captain John Olderman sailed from Liverpool on 26 April 1801. In 1800, 133 British vessels left Britain bound on voyages to transport enslaved people; 120 left from Liverpool.

Olderman commenced acquiring captives at Gorée on 19 June.

In early June 1801 Colonel Fraser, the commander of the British forces at Gorée, requested Olderman's assistance as Olderman commanded the only armed vessel on that part of the coast. Fraser had received intelligence that there was a Spanish vessel at Senegal part of whose crew had mutinied, and with the help of captives that she had embarked, had seized the ship and killed the officers. Fraser was concerned that French Captain Renaud, who was at Senegal, intended to arm the Spanish vessel as soon as she had landed her cargo and sail her as a privateer against British interests. Fraser cobbled together a force under an Army captain named Lloyd that sailed to attack the vessel in the unarmed government schooner at Fraser's disposal, apparently with Lucy providing armed support. The expedition was successful in that it was able to set fire to the Spanish vessel, whose crew had abandoned it as the British approached in boats. There were no British casualties in the operation.

Olderman died on 24 June in an insurrection by his captives. (Note: Olderman had been a highly experienced captain. Before 1797 he had made 13 voyages to the Guinea coast and Sierra Leone, and had testified before Parliament. In 1796–1797 he had been captain of Concord (1784 ship). Slave rebellions were extremely rare.) Captain John Smith replaced Olderman as master on Lucy and she arrived at Demerara on 25 December. There she sold the captives she had acquired. She sailed from Demerara on 6 March 1802 and arrived back at Liverpool on 25 May. She had left Liverpool with 28 crew members and had suffered 11 crew deaths on her voyage.

3rd voyage transporting enslaved people (1801–1802): Captain Richard Burrows sailed from Liverpool on 11 July 1805. In 1801, 147 British vessels left Britain bound on voyages to transport enslaved people; 122 left from Liverpool.

Burrows acquired captives in West Africa and arrived at Trinidad on 28 February 1806. (She had first stopped at Suriname.) At some point, after Lucy had arrived at Trinidad, Captain Thomas Palliser replaced Burrows. Lucy sailed for Liverpool on 1 May and arrived there on 7 July. She had left Liverpool with 25 crew members and had suffered 10 crew deaths on her voyage. Lucy, T.Palliser, master, brought back from Africa and Trinidad a cargo of sugar, cotton, coffee, cocoa, 27 elephant teeth (ivory tusks), 80 tons of redwood, and palm oil.

== Fate ==
Captain George Forster sailed from Liverpool on 28 September 1806. Between 1 January 1806 and 1 May 1807, 185 vessels cleared Liverpool outward bound in the slave trade. Thirty of these vessels made two voyages during this period. Of the 155 remaining vessels, 114 were regular slave ships, having made two voyages during the period, or voyages before 1806.

On 20 August 1807, Lucy sailed from Old Calabar. On 9 September she encountered a French privateer. The privateer was armed with one long 18-pounder gun and six 6-pounder guns. She had a crew of 90–100 men. At 12:30pm a severe single ship action began. Lucy repelled the first attack and a running fight began that lasted until about 3pm. Then the privateer made a second attempt to board, which was successful. Of her crew of 19 men, Lucy had lost four men killed, and eight wounded, her captain and second mate being among the wounded. The privateer took the British survivors aboard her. They arrived at Guadaloupe on 11 October.

In December 1807 Lloyd's List reported that Lucy had been taken and carried into Guadeloupe.

In 1807, 12 British slave ships were lost while engaging in the slave trade. Six were lost in the Middle Passage between Africa and the West Indies. Because the Slave Trade Act 1807 ended British participation in the trans-Atlantic slave trade, 1807 was a short year. During the period 1793 to 1807, war, rather than maritime hazards or resistance by the captives, was the greatest cause of vessel losses among British slave vessels.
