= Bheemoolah (1808 ship) =

History

United Kingdom
- Name: Bheemoolah
- Owner: 1811:Edward Brightman; 1812:Mangles & Co.
- Builder: Matthew Smith, Howrah, Calcutta
- Launched: 21 November 1808
- Renamed: Woodbridge (1812)
- Notes: Last listed in 1855

General characteristics
- Type: Ship
- Tons burthen: 479, or 47957/94, 480, or 486, or 516, or 520 (bm)
- Length: 115 ft 2 in (35.1 m)
- Beam: 32 ft 1 in (9.8 m)
- Propulsion: Sail
- Complement: 50
- Armament: 1812: 14 × 24&12-pounder carronades; 1812: 4 × 24 + 10 × 12-pounder carronades
- Notes: Teak-built

Bheemoolah (or Beemolah) was launched in 1808 at Calcutta as a "country ship", that is a vessel based in India that traded in the region and with China. She made two voyages to England for the British East India Company (EIC), one before her name changed to Woodbridge in 1812, and one after. She spent most of her career trading with the East Indies. The US Navy captured her in 1814 but the British Royal Navy recaptured her within hours. She also made two voyages transporting convicts, one voyage to New South Wales (1839-1840) and one to Van Diemen's Land (1843). She is last listed in 1855.

== Career ==
Captain Francis Patrick carried troops from the 56th Foot to Madras from within India in 1809. On 5 June 1810 Bheemoolah returned from China.

Captain David Chauvet sailed from Calcutta from 4 July 1810. She was at Diamond Harbour on 7 September. She reached Mauritius on 6 December.

Beemoolah was one of the vessels that participated in the British invasions of Île Bourbon and Île de France.

She then sailed back to Madras, which she reached on 15 March 1811, and Calcutta which she reached on 6 May.

Beemoolah, Edward Brightman, owner, appeared on a lit of vessels registered at Calcutta in January 1811.

On 28 July she was at Saugor, and Mauritius again on 29 September. She reached St Helena on 15 November, and arrived at Blackwall on 29 January 1812.

She was sold soon after she arrived in England and her new owners renamed her Woodbridge. She was admitted to the British Registry on 28 March 1812 under that name. Captain George Henry Tweedy acquired a letter of marque on 11 March 1812.

Tweedy sailed Woodbridge from Calcutta on 20 December 1813, bound for England. She reached St Helena on 5 March 1814. On 25 March the USS Adams captured Woodbridge but had to give her up when the weather cleared and British warships were observed approaching. HMS Dannemark and HMS Albacore arrived on the scene while escorting a convoy to the Brazils. Woodbridge arrived at The Downs on 1 June.

On 8 December 1815 Lloyd's List reported that Woodbridge, Smith, master, which had come from Batavia, was adrift off Margate having lost all but her foremast. Four days later it reported that she had been driven aground on the Main in Popes Bay, about five miles from Margate.

On 7 January 1817 Lloyd's List reported that Woodbridge had been driven ashore in October at the Cape of Good Hope. Three days later it reported that a gale had driven her aground in Table Bay on 5 November, the day after she had arrived. The same gale had also driven Concord, Scott, master, ashore there. Concord had been completely destroyed. There was concern that Woodbridge could not be refloated. The crews and passengers on both vessels had been saved. Part of the cargoes too had been saved, but much damaged. On 4 March Lloyd's List reported that Woodbridge had been refloated and that in December she would be fitted for sea.

On 13 January 1823 Woodbridge came into Terceira Island because she was taking on water at a rate of 3.5 feet per hour. On the 18th she commenced discharging her cargo. It was expected that it would take two weeks to unload her. She was also in need of sails.

Woodbridge arrived at London on 3 October 1828 from Sierra Leone under the command of her chief mate. Her master, second mate, and six seamen had died on the way. The rest of the crew were weak from illness and fatigue.

Woodridge arrived at the Cape of Good Hope on 21 July 1838 and left on the 26th. In January 1839 she was at Manila, having come from New South Wales, and was loading for London. She left Manila on 8 February and Anjer on 5 March. She reached St Helena on 15 May, and was at Falmouth in late July.

On 16 October 1839, Woodbridge, William B. Dobson, master, sailed from London as a convict transport. She sailed via the Cape of Good Hope and arrived at Sydney, New South Wales, on 26 February 1840. She embarked 230 male convicts, and disembarked 229, having had one convict die on the voyage. On 18 May 1840 she was at Sourabaya.

Then on 3 September 1843 Captain Dobson again sailed with convicts from London, however this time they were bound for Van Diemen's Land. Woodbridge arrived at Hobart Town on 23 December. She had embarked 204 female convicts and she disembarked them all, having suffered no convict deaths en route.

== Fate ==
Woodbridge was still trading out of London in 1850. She was last listed in Lloyd's Register in 1855.
