= Concord International High School =

- Santa Monica, California; United States

Information
- Type: Independent
- Established: 1973
- Closed: 2012
- Grades: 9-12
- Accreditation: WASC

Concord International High School (CIHS) was a private college preparatory high school founded in 1973. It was accredited by the Western Association of Schools and Colleges.

The school filed for Chapter 11 bankruptcy in November 2010 closed in 2011 and lost its 501(c)(3) Internal Revenue Service status in 2012. Susan Packer Davis, director for nearly thirty years, resigned in 2010 and was named in a civil lawsuit filed by the new board of directors.; In 2012 she "agreed to pay parents and other creditors $200,000 as part of a settlement." Some teachers and parents from CIHS founded a school called Concord Prep and located it in temporary quarters.
