= Concord (1784 ship) =

British merchant and slave ship (1784–1807)

History

Great Britain
- Name: Concord
- Launched: 1784, Gravesend
- Fate: Foundered 1807

General characteristics
- Tons burthen: 130, or 140, or 143 (bm)
- Armament: 4 × 6-pounder + 2 × 4-pounder guns

Concord was launched at Gravesend in 1784 and initially traded between England and Ireland and then with the West Indies. Between 1786 and 1806 she made 11 voyages as a slave ship in the triangular trade in enslaved people. After her last slave trading voyage, new owners started sailing Concord between the United Kingdom and Newfoundland. She foundered in 1807 while sailing from Portugal to Newfoundland.

== Career ==
Concord first appeared in Lloyd's Register (LR) in the volume for 1786. (The volume for 1785, if it existed, is not available on line.)

| Year | Master | Owner | Trade | Source |
|---|---|---|---|---|
| 1786 | J.Dove | Mess.Best; Anderson | West Indies–London; London–Africa | LR |

However, the ship arrival and departure data from Lloyd's List already showed Concord, Dove, master, sailing in 1784. On 12 November 1784 she arrived at Cork from London. Then she sailed from Cork on 7 May 1785, and arrived back at Gravesend on 15 October 1785, having come from Antigua, via Cork.

Under new ownership from 1786, Concord commenced her career as a slave ship.

1st enslaving voyage (1786–1787): Captain Michael Dove sailed from London on 12 September 1786. He acquired captives at Bance (or Ben's) Island. Concord embarked 260 captives and arrived in March 1787 with 255 captives; she landed 253. Concord arrived back at London on 25 May 1787.

2nd enslaving voyage (1787–1788): Captain Dove sailed from London on 18 July 1787. He acquired captives first in the Sierra Leone Estuary and then at Bance Island. Concord arrived at Grenada on 18 March 1788. The data on the number of captives that embarked and that were landed is contradictory. The database on the Trans-Atlantic Slave Trade reports that Concord embarked 231 captives, but landed 298. Concord, Smith, master, returned to London on 8 June. (Note: Josiah Smith had come out to Jamaica on another Concord, leaving Gravesend on 24 April. He apparently joined the Concord of this article either in Jamaica or in Grenada. The Trans-Atlantic Slave Trade reports the Concord of this article returned to London on 25 September, but that misses a voyage to Jamaica and back between June and September.)

Lloyd's List in August reported that Concord, Smith, master, had arrived at Jamaica. She arrived back at Gravesend on 25 September.

The Slave Trade Act 1788 (Dolben's Act) limited the number of enslaved people that British slave ships could transport without penalty, based on the ships' tons burthen. It was the first British legislation passed to regulate slave shipping. At a burthen of 130 tons, the cap would have been 217 captives. After the passage of Dolben's Act, masters received a bonus of £100 for a mortality rate of under 2%; the ship's surgeon received £50. For a mortality rate between two and three per cent, the bonus was halved. There was no bonus if mortality exceeded 3%.

3rd enslaving voyage (1788–1790): Captain Josiah Smith sailed from London on 11 November 1788. He acquired captives at Bance Island and arrived at Kingston, Jamaica on 5 December 1789 with 208 captives. Concord arrived back at London on 9 June 1790.

4th enslaving voyage (1790–1791): Captain Josiah Smith sailed from London on 5 August 1790. He acquired captives at Bance Island and arrived at Kingston on 21 January 1791 with 237 captives. Concord arrived back at London on 3 July.

5th enslaving voyage (1791–1792): Captain Josiah Smith sailed from London on 24 August 1791. He acquired captives in the Sierra Leone estuary and arrived at Port Maria, Jamaica on 9 March 1792 with 195 captives. Concord arrived back at England on 20 July.

6th enslaving voyage (1792–1793): Captain Josiah Smith sailed from London on 5 November 1792. He acquired captives at Bance Island and arrived at Kingston on 21 April 1793 with 240 captives. Concord arrived back in England on 10 September 1793.

| Year | Master | Owner | Trade | Source |
|---|---|---|---|---|
| 1794 | Illegible; J.Wilkins | Anderson | London–Africa | LR |

7th enslaving voyage (1794–1795): Captain B. Merrick sailed from London on 21 November 1794. He acquired captives at Bance Island and sailed from Africa on 4 June 1795. Concord arrived at St Croix in July, and arrived back at London on 12 October.

8th enslaving voyage (1796–1797): Captain John Olderman sailed from London on 19 April 1796. He acquired captives first in the Sierra Leone estuary, and second at Bance Island. Concord arrived at Zion Hill on 6 April 1797 with 236 captives. She arrived back at London on 16 July. (Note: Olderman would die on 26 June 1801 while captain of Lucy.)

| Year | Master | Owner | Trade | Source |
|---|---|---|---|---|
| 1796 | J.Wilkins; B.Merrick | Anderson | London–Africa | LR |
| 1799 | B.Merrick; McLean | Anderson | London–Africa | LR; thorough repair 1799 |

9th enslaving voyage (1799–1800): Captain John McLean left London on 9 September 1799. He acquired captives at Bance Island and arrived at Demerara on 8 April 1800 with 211 captives.

| Year | Master | Owner | Trade | Source |
|---|---|---|---|---|
| 1801 | J.McLean; J.Welch | Anderson | Portsmouth–Africa; London–Africa | LR; thorough repair 1799 |

On 22 September 1801 Concord, Welch, master, sailed for Africa. On 4 August 1802 she returned to Gravesend from Sierra Leone.

| Year | Master | Owner | Trade | Source |
|---|---|---|---|---|
| 1803 | J.Welch; J.Dowding | J.Anderson | London–Africa | LR; thorough repair 1791 |

10th enslaving voyage (1803–1804): Captain John Dowding sailed from London on 10 April 1803. He reached Madeira on 3 May. He acquired captives at the Sierra Leone estuary. Concord arrived at Grenada on 30 December 1803 with 159 captives. She arrived back at London on 11 August 1804.

11th enslaving voyage (1803–1804): Captain Dowding sailed from London on 8 November 1804. Concord arrived at Berbice in October 1805. She returned to London on 16 February 1806 with Welch, master.

| Year | Master | Owner | Trade | Source |
|---|---|---|---|---|
| 1806 | J.Douding; R.Ball | Anderson | London–Africa | LR; thorough repair 1791 |
| 1806 | R.Ball | Slater & Co. | London–Newfoundland | LR; thorough repair 1791 |

Lloyd's List reported in January 1807 that Concord, Balls, master, had arrived at Newfoundland with damage. On 6 March Concord, Ball, master, arrived at Gibraltar from Newfoundland.

== Fate ==
Lloyd's List reported in September 1807 that Concord, Ball, master, had foundered while sailing from St Ubes to Newfoundland. Her crew arrived at Fayal.
