= Concordia, Ede =

Dutch windmill

Concordia
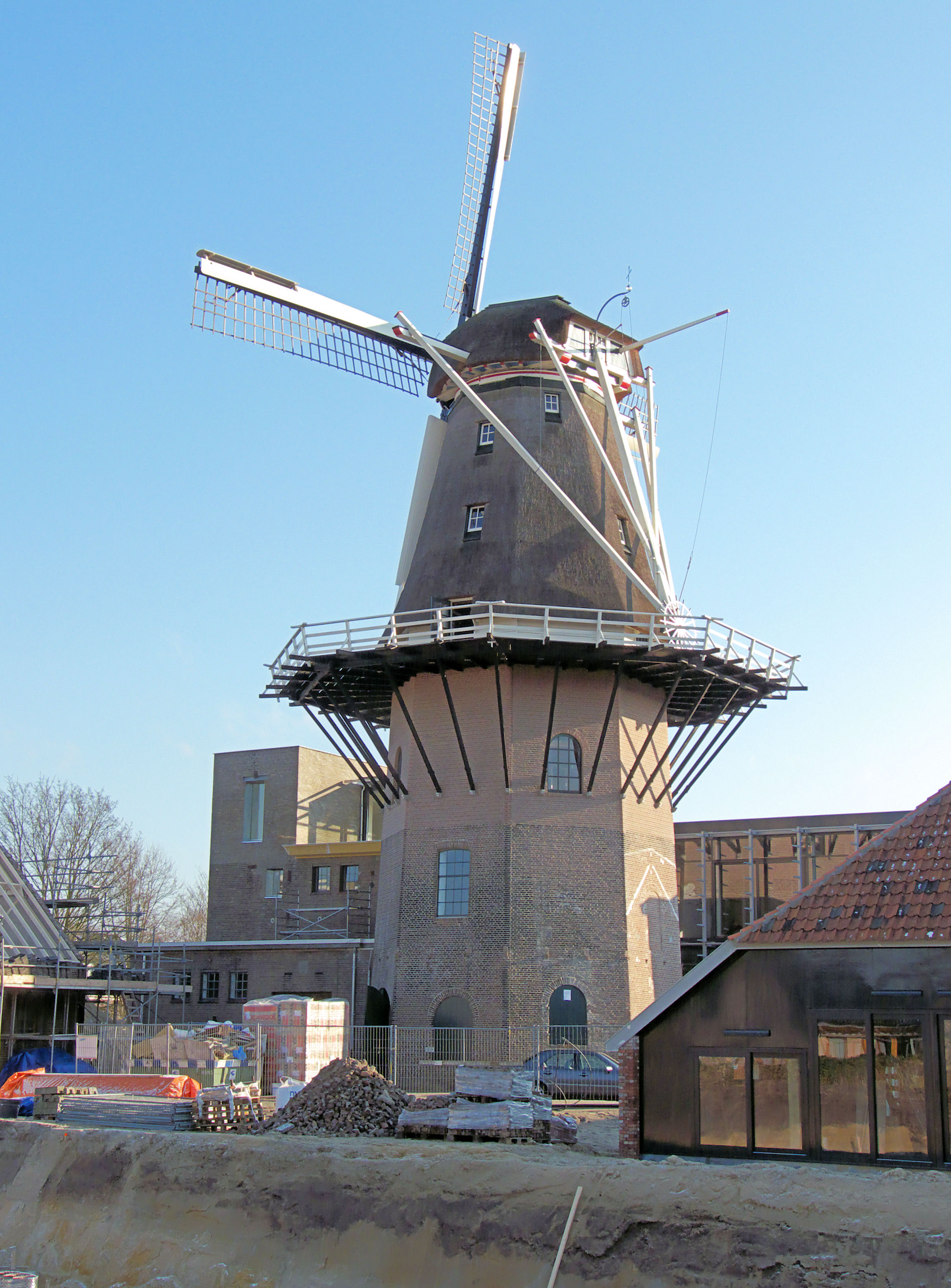
- Concordia, Ede, March 2010

Origin
- Mill name: Concordia molen
- Mill location: Ede, Netherlands
- Coordinates: 52°2′48.87″N 5°39′56.91″E
- Year built: 1868

Information
- Purpose: Grain mill
- Type: Smock mill
- Storeys: Three-storey smock
- Base storeys: Three-storey base
- Smock sides: Eight-sided smock
- No. of sails: Four sails
- Type of sails: Common sails
- Windshaft: Cast iron
- Winding: Tailpole and winch

Concordia is a smock mill in Ede, the Netherlands, which is maintained in working order. The mill is listed as Rijksmonument number 14469.

== History ==
The mill was built in 1868 to replace an earlier mill that burnt down in 1865, which was believed to date back to the 17th century. The new mill would partly originate from Zaan, where it was used as a sawmill. In Ede, however, the mill was used mainly for milling grain and to extract oil from beechnuts.

== Description ==
The mill is octagonal and has a tapered brick base with a wooden thatch superstructure. The hood is made of reeds. Gable on the east side of the reel, with the inscription "JW van de Craats / EDU 26 OCT. 1889." Inside the mill remains various parts of the machinery.
