= California Concordia College =

Former college in Oakland, California

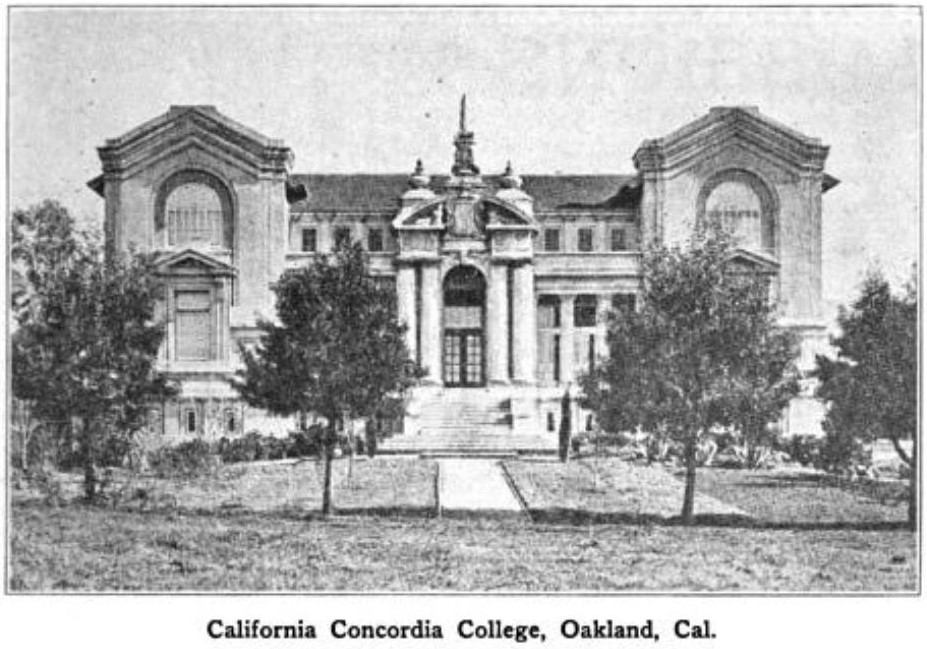
- California Concordia College in 1922
- Type: Private college and high school
- Active: 1906–1973
- Religious affiliation: Lutheran Church–Missouri Synod
- Location: 6325 Camden Street, Oakland, California, United States; 37°46′21″N 122°10′57″W
- Campus: Urban

California Concordia College was a junior college and high school in Oakland, California, United States, from 1906 until 1973. It was affiliated with the Lutheran Church–Missouri Synod (LCMS) and was established for the training of Lutheran pastors and Christian day school teachers.

== History ==
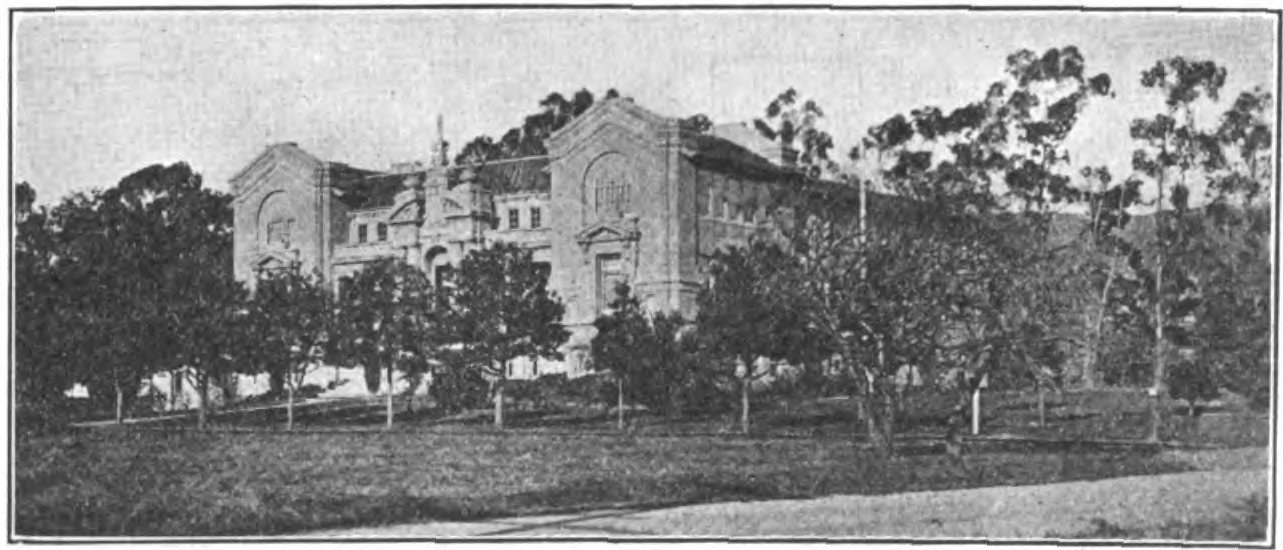
California Concordia College in 1925

Concordia was established in 1906 as a four-year high school (the "Academy") for boys. Its first building, a house at the corner of East 15th Street and 17th Avenue in Oakland, was dedicated on July 15, 1906, with the first classes in September. Ten students made up the first student body, with Herman Jonas as the first teacher.

In about 1912, the Lutheran Education Association led efforts to buy the site at 6325 Camden Street for a permanent location. The California and Nevada District of the LCMS began a fundraising drive to build the new campus, with the new school being dedicated on April 11, 1915. In 1918, the junior college department was added so that students would not have to transfer to one of the other LCMS colleges upon graduation from high school.

The California and Nevada District relinquished control of the school to the national LCMS in 1921. Thereafter additional buildings were erected. The high school became co-educational In 1938, as did the junior college in 1951. In the early 1960s, a new master plan was being developed for the expansion of the school and its facilities.

The college and high school were closed in 1973. The academic records were transferred to Concordia University Irvine, which also supports the California Concordia alumni group.

The Camden Street site is now the location of the Spectrum Center Camden Campus, a provider of special education services. Some of the school buildings still exist at this location, but the older buildings that housed the earlier classrooms and later the dormitories have been demolished.

Among the presidents of California Concordia were Johann Theodore Gotthold Brohm Jr, O. T. Walle, and Ernest F. Scaer.

== School life ==
California Concordia was a six-year institution patterned after the German gymnasium. This provided four years of high school, plus two years of junior college. Years in the school took their names from Latin numbers and referred to the years to go before graduation. The classes were named:

- Sexta - 6 years to go; high school freshman
- Qunita - 5 years to go; high school sophomore
- Quarta - 4 years to go; high school junior
- Tertia - 3 years to go; high school senior
- Secunda - 2 years to go; college freshman
- Prima - 1 year to go; college sophomore

Those in Sexta were usually hazed in a mild way by upperclassmen and were required to do a certain amount of clean-up work around the school, such as picking up trash.

Most students lived in dormitories. High school students were supervised by "proctors" (selected high school seniors in Tertia). High school students were required to study for two hours each night in their study rooms from 7:00 to 9:00 pm. Students could not leave their rooms for any reason without permission. This requirement came as quite a shock to those in Sexta (freshmen) on their first night, when they were caught and scolded by a proctor when they left their study room to go to the bathroom without permission. Seniors (those in Tertia) were allowed one night off on which they did not need to be in their study hall.

From 9:00 to 9:30 pm all students gathered for a chapel service. From 9:30 to 10 pm, high school students were free to roam, and sometimes went to the local Lucky Supermarket to purchase snacks. All high school students were required to be in bed with lights out by 10:00 pm. There were generally five students in each dormitory room. The room had two sections: a bedroom area and (across the hallway) another room for studying. Four beds, including at least one bunk bed, were in the bedroom, and four or five desks were in the study room

Proctors made their rounds in the morning to make sure beds were made and inspected rooms in the evening to ensure that students were in bed by 10:00 pm. Often after the proctors left a room at night, the room lights would go back on. Student might be racked if they failed to make their beds or did not make them neatly enough.

== Athletics ==
California Concordia fielded baseball and basketball teams. The college teams were known as the Cougars while the high school teams were known as the Braves.
