= Concord (District Heights, Maryland) =

Historic house in Maryland, United States

- U.S. National Register of Historic Places
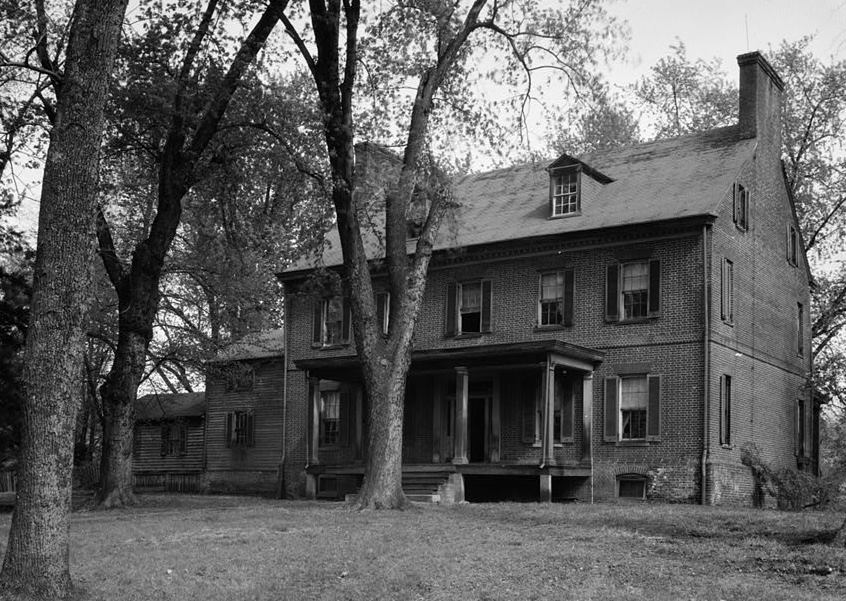
- Concord, 1936 HABS Photo

- Location within Maryland Location within the United States
- Location: 8000 Walker Mill Rd., District Heights, Maryland
- Coordinates: 38°52′39″N 76°52′2″W
- Area: 44 acres (18 ha)
- Built: 1797
- Architectural style: Greek Revival, Federal
- NRHP reference No.: 82004681
- Added to NRHP: May 12, 1982

Concord is a historic home located in District Heights, Prince George's County, Maryland. It is a 1790s 2 1/2-story Flemish bond brick house with a five-bay south facade, and a later two-part wing which stretches to the west. The home was built for Zachariah Berry, Sr. (1749-1845), a prosperous planter who had large landholdings in Maryland, the District of Columbia, and Kentucky. A great deal of the home's features are Greek Revival-influenced, dating from an 1860s renovation. A family cemetery and a number of 20th century outbuildings are located on the property.

Concord was listed on the National Register of Historic Places in 1982.
