= Orleans Flat, California =

Orleans Flat
- Former settlement
- Location in California
- Coordinates: 39°25′44″N 120°50′06″W
- Country: United States
- State: California
- County: Nevada
- Elevation: 4,153 ft (1,266 m)

Orleans Flat was a historic mining town located on the San Juan Ridge about 20 miles northeast of Nevada City, California and about 5 miles northeast of North Bloomfield, California. The town was about 1 mile south of the Middle Yuba River at an elevation of about 4200 ft. To the west lay the mining towns of Moore's Flat and Woolsey's Flat, each about I mile apart. All three were settled around 1851 and their histories frequently intertwine. Collectively, they are sometimes referred to as "The Flats." All three were part of Eureka Township.

An early pioneer describes the physical relation of the Flats as follows: "Moore's Flat, Orleans Flat and Woolsey's Flat are all similarly situated on different points of the mountain, on the north side of the ridge between the South and Middle Yuba River, and all at about the same altitude. A very deep canyon lies between each of them, but a good mountain road was built around the head of each canyon, connecting the towns."

Orleans Flat was founded in 1850 or 1851. The town was originally settled by miners from New Hampshire, who named it Concord. They left after a while "with well-filled purses." They were replaced by Southerners who renamed it New Orleans Flat. Most accounts simply call it Orleans Flat. The Flat itself was described as about "one hundred and sixty acres, resembling in outline an irregular gibbous semi-circle."

Orleans Flat lies on a part of the auriferous [gold bearing] channel which runs the length of the San Juan Ridge. In such channels, the gold lies under layers of gravel, with the richest deposits being close to the bed rock. At Orleans Flat, the gravel deposits were the shallowest among the Flats, so it became the first town to thrive. There was an initial period of successful surface mining. The Flats were renowned for the discovery of large nuggets and gold-bearing boulders. One discovered at Orleans Flat in 1858 contained at least $6,000 worth of gold. Another found in 1869 had $8700 in gold.

The Flats became an early adopter of hydraulic mining, which boomed with the arrival of ditch water. Berryman's Poor Man's Creek Ditch arrived in 1854. The Miners' Ditch followed in 1856 and the Weaver Ditch in 1860. One authority claimed that the gravel at Orleans was very rich, and the flats pay better returns any of the other deposits in this vicinity.

In the 1850s, Orleans was the leading town of the Flats, once described as "the most prosperous mining camp" on the Ridge. By 1852, the town had a population of 600. It boasted several hotels, stores, saloons, a sawmill, a bank, a bakery, a brewery and a theater. It was connected by various stage lines to Nevada City, Marysville and other places on the Ridge.

The town had a fair share of parades, balls and entertainments. Around 1855, a building was erected to be used as a nondenominational church, temperance hall and schoolhouse, but it does not appear that it was ever used as a church or schoolhouse. The Rev. J. S. Diehl organized a Sons of Temperance branch and a Sabbath school, but where those meetings were held is not recorded.

In 1855, 223 votes were recorded at Orleans Flat. In the 1860 presidential election, 97 votes were recorded, with Douglas receiving 52. It hosted important political events and rallies held in that part of the Ridge. In 1856, a Masonic Lodge was established at Orleans Flat, named Quitman Lodge, No. 88. There was also an Odd Fellows Lodge and a lodge hall was built jointly by the two lodges. In 1863, the lodge hall was moved to Moore's Flat.

A most unusual occurrence involved a Dr. Kittredge who operated a drugstore in Orleans Flat. After a young child died and was buried, it was discovered that her body had been removed from the grave. Townspeople, alerted by the suspicious conduct of his clerk who "rode furiously" out of town, confronted Dr. Kittredge, who admitted that he had removed the body ostensibly for the purposes of scientific inspection. Although some townspeople wanted to lynch him, it was finally agreed that if he would produce the body, which had not been dissected, so it could be reburied, he would be let go. That happened, but the townspeople shunned him and he soon left Orleans Flat.

One of the most successful entrepreneurs in Orleans Flat was Marks Zellerbach. A Jewish immigrant from Bavaria in Germany, he founded a bank, Marks & Co., owned an interest in a number of mines and became a principal in the Eureka Land and Water Company, which supplied water to many of the mines on the Ridge. He was also one of the early investors in the Nevada County Narrow Gauge Railroad. In many of these endeavors, he was assisted by his brother Anthony, a resident of Moore's Flat, who went on to found what became the Crown Zellerbach Paper Company.

By 1857, the shallow gravel mines had been exhausted and the town began to decline. Many residents moved to neighboring Moore's Flat or to other locations on the Ridge. Others began to drift mine closer to and under the town, often undermining the town's houses. Fire destroyed a number of buildings in 1859. A more devastating fire occurred in 1863, burning all the buildings on the south side of Main Street, including several houses, the former drug store, the butcher shop and several other stores and saloons. Arson was suspected. For all these reasons, the town was soon deserted.

In 1867, Orleans Flat was described as follows: "...it is now nearly deserted. A few Mexicans and Chinamen make a precarious living in working around the abandoned claims, but with this exception mining is suspended, and now there are not more than half a dozen American residents at the place."

In 1869, a local paper was more succinct: "Orleans Flat, once a lively mining camp, in the northern part of the county, but for a long time dead, is likely to revive, and the mines there to be worked again." While some mining continued after 1869, the paper's prediction never happened; the town never revived. Among the last residents were the four Buck Brothers, all born at Orleans Flat, who mined, farmed and ranched into the 20th century. Today, apart from the Buck ranch house which sits on a hill overlooking the old townsite, nothing remains but lots of rock piles.
