= Concord, West Virginia =

Concord is the name of several communities in the U.S. state of West Virginia.

- Concord, Hampshire County, West Virginia
- Athens, West Virginia, formerly known as Concord, and location of Concord University
