= Concord Park (Charleston) =

Development in Charleston, South Carolina, US

Coordinates: 32.7882°N 79.9275°W

- Interactive map of Concord Park
- Area: 5.4 acres (2.2 ha)
- Operator: City of Charleston

Concord Park is a 9.1-acre development in Charleston, South Carolina, near the Cooper River and South Carolina Aquarium. The name is used to refer to a 5.4-acre public park planned for the center of the development, the 3.7-acre mixed-use development along the north and south edges, and the overall development.

== History ==
Starting in 1847, the Concord Park tract was an industrial site that for many years housed a gas plant that spread coal tar and other chemicals, according to South Carolina environmental regulators. A low-income housing project known as the Anson Borough Homes, with 162 units, was built in 1940 as part of a federally funded slum clearance. The housing project was closed in 1991 because the city claimed it suffered pollution and flooding problems. Residents of the housing project were relocated, and the buildings were demolished in October 1996, despite environmental reports in September 1996 that the land did not suffer contamination. Former residents of the Ansonborough Homes suggested that the fear of contamination had been used as an excuse for clearing the property for higher-value redevelopment by the city.

In the place of the Anson Borough Homes project, the City of Charleston pursued a plan which would bring economic development to the tract, the largest undeveloped parcel south of Calhoun Street. The City wanted a mixed used development to replace the low-income housing that had been on the site. The city's plan called for a 5.4-acre park, with housing and businesses on an additional 3.7 acres when it began the design process in March 2005.

== Private development ==
The development plan by East West Cumberland Park Associates was chosen by the city more than a year before finalizing the terms of the sale from several competing proposals. Of the 10-acre site, the developer would buy 3.48 acres, divided into two sections, plus nearly an acre of right of way for $16 million. The city had asked a small, prescreened group of developers to come up with their best proposals for redeveloping the northern and southern ends of the site, leaving a city park in the middle. In May 2006, the City of Charleston continued negotiations solely with East West Cumberland Associates based on its proposal having the highest number of low-income housing units.

In addition to paying $16 million, the agreement called for East West to construct public restrooms, create 60 units of affordable housing, and make 2,000 square feet of office space available for nonprofit use at 67.5 percent or less of market rates. The requirement for 60 units of low-income house was controversial. While there was some support for opening the project entirely to free-market housing to maximize the sales price to a developer, there was also support for replacing the 162 units of the Ansonborough Homes which had been demolished to make way for the project. Support also existed for leaving the property entirely open as a single park. Apart from the low-income housing units, the development agreement would allow 163 market-rate residential units; up to two 50-room hotels; 16,600 square feet of retail space; and about 25,000 square feet of office space. The agreement left open the possibility of swapping the two 50-room hotels for a 100-room hotel, but the switch would require a rezoning.

The land was sold by the City of Charleston for $16 million to East West Cumberland Park Associates, which proposed to build hotel rooms, 233 housing units and commercial space on either end of a public park about the size of Marion Square. As the recession and the credit crunch dug in, that plan bogged down and multiple extensions were granted to the developer. In May 2008, a delay in closing was sought to give more time to negotiate environmental clean-up issues with state regulators in exchange for $50,000. In November 2008, the developer sought a third extension in a deal which resulted in a $1.85 million deposit to be surrendered to the city and a reduction of environmental clean-up liability from $4 million to $3 million by the city. In late 2009, the city agreed to amend the purchase agreement to allow East West Cumberland Associates to sell part of the property, add more office space, and reduce the number of planned homes. As of October 2010, East West was negotiating a deal to sell the piece of land at the south end of the Concord Park site to a national company that will build the affordable housing that was required as part of the deal. East West Cumberland Park Associates acquired strips of land along the northern edge of the parcel and also along the southern edge. Left in the middle was a portion about the size of Marion Square which Charleston intended to have as a greenspace. After experiencing financial troubles, East West Cumberland Park Associates sought permission to sell off a portion of its southern acquisition to a third party known as the Humanities Foundation which would then pursue low-income housing on its own.

The first commercial development broke ground in October 2010 when Atlanta-based Holder Properties started work on a four-story, 62,000 square foot office building at 25 Calhoun Street.

== Gadsdenboro Park ==
The City held public meetings early on to plot the future of the interior park space. In August 2008, a consultant for the City reported back its preliminary findings about the design of the interior park. The consultant said that the earlier studies showed that people liked the idea of garden rooms, water features such as fountains, ample seating, places that were shaded with both architecture and vegetation, and public art pieces. A design presented included a playground, picnic area, soccer fields and a possible "sports run" that would have a small basketball court and a hopscotch area. There was also a consideration in the plan for one corner of the park to be designated as a dog-friendly area.

In 2016, the city opened Gadsdenboro Park.
