= Concord New Energy =

Global renewable energy company

Concord New Energy Group Limited
- Native name: 協合新能源集團有限公司
- Type: Public company
- Traded as: SEHK: 182; SGX: SEG
- Industry: Renewable energy, Public utility
- Headquarters: Singapore
- Area served: Worldwide
- Key people: Liu Shunxing (Chairman); Liu Jianhong (Vice Chairman); Niu Wenhui (Executive Director)
- Products: Wind power, Solar power, Energy storage systems
- Services: EPC services, intelligent operation and maintenance, consultancy, financial leasing

Chinese name
- Simplified Chinese: 协合新能源集团有限公司
- Traditional Chinese: 協合新能源集團有限公司
Transcriptions
Standard Mandarin
- Hanyu Pinyin: Xiéhé xīnnéngyuán jítuán yǒuxiàn gōngsī
Yue: Cantonese
- Yale Romanization: hip hahp sān nàhng yùhn jaahp tyùhn yáuh haahn gūng sī
- Jyutping: hip3 hap6 san1 nang4 jyun4 zaap6 tyun4 jau5 haan6 gung1 si1

China Windpower Group Limited
- Simplified Chinese: 中国风电集团有限公司
- Traditional Chinese: 中國風電集團有限公司
Transcriptions
Standard Mandarin
- Hanyu Pinyin: Zhōngguó fēngdiàn jítuán yǒuxiàn gōngsī
Yue: Cantonese
- Yale Romanization: jūng gwok fūng dihn jaahp tyùhn yáuh haahn gūng sī
- Jyutping: zung1 gwok3 fung1 din6 zaap6 tyun4 jau5 haan6 gung1 si1

Hong Kong Pharmaceutical Holdings Limited
- Simplified Chinese: 香港药业集团有限公司
- Traditional Chinese: 香港药業集團有限公司
Transcriptions
Standard Mandarin
- Hanyu Pinyin: Xiānggǎng yàoyè jítuán yǒuxiàn gōngsī
Yue: Cantonese
- Yale Romanization: hēung góng yeuhk yihp jaahp tyùhn yáuh haahn gūng sī
- Jyutping: hoeng1 gong2 joek6 jip6 zaap6 tyun4 jau5 haan6 gung1 si1

Nam Pei Hong International Holdings Limited
- Traditional Chinese: 南北行國際集團有限公司
Transcriptions

Nam Pei Hong (Holding) Limited
- Traditional Chinese: 南北行（集團）有限公司
Transcriptions
- Website: concordnewenergy.com

Concord New Energy Group Limited is a Singapore-headquartered renewable energy company listed on the Hong Kong Stock Exchange (0182.HK) and the Singapore Exchange (SEG.SG). The company is primarily engaged in the development, ownership, and operation of wind power, solar energy, and energy storage projects across the Asia-Pacific and North American regions.

== History ==
=== Trade business ===
The company was named Nan Pei Hong International Holdings Limited in 1997, and was renamed NPH International Holdings Limited between 1997 and 2000. From 2000 to 2007, it was known as Hong Kong Pharmaceutical Industry Limited (also referred to as Hong Kong Pharmaceuticals or Hong Kong Medicine Industry).

Nam Pei Hong International Holdings was a Bermuda-incorporated offshore company. Nam Pak Hong (Chinese: 南北行) was a kind of trading company that import and export goods from China. Bonham Strand was also nicknamed "Nam Pak Hong street" in Chinese language. However, the listed company did not headquartered in Bonham Strand, also did not own any properties on that street. However, the listed company was the parent company of Nam Pei Hong Sum Yung Drugs Company Limited (南北行參茸葯材有限公司), a trading company in Chinese medicine such as dried abalone, birds' nests, dried scallops, ginseng, etc.

Before 1997, the business was incorporated and listed in Hong Kong as Nam Pei Hong (Holding) Limited (Chinese: 南北行（集團）有限公司). It was incorporated in 1984 and listed on 27 November 1991. Soon after the Hong Kong incorporated holding company, Nam Pei Hong (Holding), became a subsidiary of the Bermuda-incorporated new holding company in 1997, it was renamed to Foster (Group) Limited from 1998 to 2000. As of 31 March 2006, it was still a wholly owned subsidiary of the group. However, after the listed company became an investment vehicle for a backdoor listing, the Nam Pei Hong division was sold to Johnson Ko, one of the shareholder of the listed company in 2009, for HK$34 million. Nam Pei Hong (Holding) was dissolved by striking-off in 2010. However, as of 2019, the former subsidiaries, Nam Pei Hong Sum Yung Drugs and N P H Sino-Meditech Limited, were live companies.

It was reported that Heilongjiang Economic Development Corp. (Chinese: 黑龍江經濟開發集團公司) acquired the controlling stake of the listed company in 1996 [sic]. The Hong Kong stock exchange also publicly criticised the listed company and former managers for failing to disclose the sale of the company in time. According to South China Morning Post, Victory Hunter Holdings, an investment vehicle owned by Yau Wai-ming (Chinese: 邱伟铭; pinyin: Qiū Wěimíng) of Heilongjiang provincial government [sic], acquired 33% stake of the listed company from International Tak Cheung Holdings, the former significant owner of the listed company in July 1997. According to a press release, Yau transferred the stake of Victory Hunter Holdings to Hong Tau Investment in 1999 for HK$1. 2 directors of the listed company, Sun Hiu-lu [sic] (simplified Chinese: 孙晓路; traditional Chinese: 孫曉路; pinyin: Sūn Xiǎolù) and Chu Kwan [sic] (Chinese: 朱均; pinyin: Zhū Jūn), via Welcome Success Worldwide Limited, owned 51% stake of Hong Tau, however, themselves did not have "a casting vote or control of Welcome Success Worldwide". The remaining 49% stake of Hong Tau were owned by Heilongjiang Economic Development (which was later renamed to Heilongjiang China United Co., Ltd.; Chinese: 黑龍江中盟集團有限公司) and another government-owned company Heilongjian International Trust Investment Corporation. According to the last publication before 2004 suspension, as at 30 September 2003, Hong Tau still owned a majority stake (67.2%) of the listed company It was reported that Sun acquired the aforementioned stake from Yau in 1999, also caused a price fluctuation of the shares of the listed company.

The listed company was renamed to Hong Kong Pharmaceutical Holdings Limited in 2000. However, the poor management under new owner(s), had caused the listed company in the brink of liquidation in 2004.

In 2005, Johnson Ko Chun-shun (Chinese: 高振順; Jyutping: Gou1 Zan3 Seon6; Cantonese Yale: Gōu Jan Seuhn) acquired the controlling stake (85.2%) of the listed company from the liquidator. The listed company also sold two Mainland-incorporated subsidiaries to the bond holders. The listed company also said to be refocus on Nam Pak Hong trading business, despite the division was sold to Ko in 2009. Johnson Ko was the chairman of the company from 2006 until 2009, which his position was changed to vice-chairman in June 2009. After a reverse IPO in 2007, Johnson Ko was still one of the major shareholders of the company until 2015. In May 2015, he sold most of his shareholding (held via a company he owned: Gain Alpha) of Concord New Energy, which was decreased from 22.36% to 2.24% of the share capital. Johnson Ko and his daughter Samantha Ko Wing-yan were resigned as directors of the company in June 2015.

In December 2006, the listed company was resumed from trading after more than 2 years of suspension. The closing price was HK$0.47 per share, or a decrease of HK$1.47 in magnitude.

=== Energy business ===
In April 2007 Hong Kong Pharmaceutical acquired China Wind Power Holdings Limited as a reverse IPO. The listed company also renamed to China WindPower Group Limited (upper cap "P") after the deal. Engaged in the engineering, procurement and construction (EPC), operation and maintenance of wind power plants, the manufacture of wind power equipment and other wind power-related businesses.In 2015, the listed company was renamed to Concord New Energy Group Limited. According to the press release, since the company had acquired solar farm in 2011, the company's newly installed power generating capacity had been mainly from solar power since 2014, thus renaming the company.In November 2017, the company suspended the issuance of its bond. The public offering of the bond was resumed in January 2018. In 2017, Fitch Ratings assigned a "BB−" rating to the company.In 2018, Concord New Energy was part of the consortium to provide venture funding to Malta Inc., a spin off of Alphabet Inc.

Beginning in 2025, Concord New Energy experienced a sharp decline in both financial performance and market capitalization, Profits fell by nearly 83% year-on-year, driven by industry-wide power curtailment and downward pressure on electricity prices. In August 2025, the international rating agency Fitch Ratings downgraded the company's Long-Term Foreign-Currency Issuer Default Rating (IDR) from "BB-" to "B+" due to elevated financial leverage and falling profits, and subsequently withdrew the rating.As of the end of 2025, the company's total full-time headcount had been cut by 30% compared to the end of 2024.

In January 2026, Concord New Energy Group Limited completed its secondary listing on the Mainboard of the Singapore Exchange (SGX) by way of introduction, under the stock code SEG.In March, the company put its first industrial rooftop solar project into operation in the Tuas Industrial Estate in Singapore.The company also signed a Memorandum of Understanding (MOU) with Bridge Data Centres, a subsidiary of Bain Capital, in Singapore.
