= Puerto Concordia =

Coordinates: 2°41′N 72°46′W

- Municipality and town
- Flag

- Location of the municipality and town of Puerto Concordia in the Meta Department of Colombia.
- Country: Colombia
- Department: Meta Department
- Elevation: 201 m (659 ft)

Population (Census 2018)
  - Total: 8,086
- Time zone: UTC-5 (Colombia Standard Time)
- Climate: Am

Puerto Concordia (Spanish pronunciation: [ˈpweɾto koŋˈkoɾðja]) is a town and municipality in the Meta Department, Colombia.
