= ABC Warehouse =

Michigan chain of appliance and electronics stores

- Type: Private
- Industry: Retail
- Founded: 1963
- Founder: Gordon Hartunian
- Headquarters: Pontiac, Michigan, U.S.
- Number of locations: 40 ABC Warehouse stores, 4 Mickey Shorr stores, 3 Hawthorne locations
- Area served: Michigan, Ohio, Indiana
- Key people: Martin Hartunian (CEO)
- Products: Home appliances, televisions, furniture, mattresses, consumer electronics
- Number of employees: 1,750+
- Subsidiaries: Mickey Shorr, Hawthorne Home Appliances & Electronics
- Website: www.abcwarehouse.com

ABC Warehouse, Inc., also known as ABC Appliance, Inc., is an American privately held retail chain based in Pontiac, Michigan. The company sells home appliances, televisions, furniture, mattresses, and consumer electronics. Founded in 1963 by Gordon "Gordy" Hartunian, ABC Warehouse operates 40 stores across Michigan, Ohio, and Indiana.

The company also owns the Mickey Shorr automotive electronics retail chain, which operates four locations, and Hawthorne Home Appliances & Electronics, a retailer specializing in premium home appliances with three locations, including two located within ABC Warehouse stores. ABC Warehouse is known for its longtime advertising slogan, "The Closest Thing to Wholesale".

== History ==
Gordon "Gordy" Hartunian founded ABC Warehouse in 1963 and opened the company's first store in a former warehouse in Center Line, Michigan. Hartunian had previously worked for the Detroit-area appliance retailer Hot & Cold, which later closed its Detroit stores. By 1980, ABC Warehouse had expanded to three locations, with additional stores in Pontiac and Flint.

In November 1998, ABC Warehouse participated in an early public demonstration of high-definition television in the Detroit market. When WXYZ-DT broadcast an HDTV presentation of 101 Dalmatians, ABC Warehouse displayed the broadcast at 13 of its Detroit-area stores. The company promoted the event through local television and newspaper advertising and reopened participating stores for the Sunday evening broadcast. Approximately 4,000 people attended the demonstrations.

In 2007, ABC Warehouse was among the consumer electronics retailers certified to participate in the National Telecommunications and Information Administration (NTIA) digital-to-analog converter box coupon program as part of the United States' transition to digital television.

In 2009, GE Money entered into a multi-year agreement with ABC Warehouse to provide the retailer's private-label credit card program.

In 2017, ABC Warehouse supplied more than 1,600 televisions and monitors for the newly constructed Little Caesars Arena in Detroit. The company also supplied more than 500 displays to Ford Field as part of renovations to the stadium.

ABC Warehouse operates 40 stores across Michigan, Ohio, and Indiana, with the majority of its locations in Michigan and a significant concentration in the Metro Detroit area. The company is headquartered in Pontiac, Michigan, adjacent to the former site of the Pontiac Silverdome.

== Sports sponsorships ==
ABC Warehouse has maintained sponsorship and promotional relationships with professional and minor-league sports organizations throughout Michigan and the surrounding region.

The company has had a longstanding presence at Detroit sports venues. In addition to supplying televisions and monitors for Little Caesars Arena and Ford Field, ABC Warehouse has used sponsorships and in-venue advertising to promote the company to Detroit sports fans.

ABC Warehouse has had a long-running promotional relationship with the Toledo Mud Hens, sponsoring promotions and giveaways including the team's magnet schedule giveaway.

The company has participated in promotions associated with the Detroit Tigers. In 2013, ABC Warehouse was among the sponsors of the Detroit Tigers Foundation's "Gloves for Kids" equipment donation program at Comerica Park.

In 2025, ABC Warehouse announced a partnership with the Detroit Lions as the presenting partner of the Detroit Lions DJs. The relationship continued into the 2026 season, with ABC Warehouse participating in Lions-related promotions and events.

ABC Warehouse has also supported minor-league sports organizations in its regional markets, including the Kalamazoo Wings.

== Advertising ==
Advertising has played a prominent role in ABC Warehouse's regional identity, particularly in Michigan. The company has frequently used humor, recurring personalities, and its longtime slogan, "The Closest Thing to Wholesale", in its advertising.

During the 1980s, ABC Warehouse advertisements featured Jim Varney as his character Ernest P. Worrell. Children were also offered paper Ernest masks at ABC Warehouse stores. Detroit-area comedian Tim Allen also appeared in an ABC Warehouse television commercial in 1981.

During the 1990s, ABC commercials featured the "ABC Warehouse Employees Choir", with employees performing advertising songs including "Price Protection", sung to the tune of "Alouette".

From the late 1990s through the late 2000s, company founder Gordon "Gordy" Hartunian became a recurring figure in ABC Warehouse advertising. Hartunian appeared in a series of humorous television commercials known as "Gordyisms".

In the 2020s, the company introduced Chad, an in-house advertising character described by ABC Warehouse as "ABC Warehouse's Biggest Fan". Chad has appeared in the company's videos, advertising, social media content, stores, and community events. The character has subsequently been incorporated into other ABC Warehouse advertising campaigns, including the company's "Deal Therapy" campaign.
