= Concordia Lutheran Church =

Concordia Lutheran Church is an often-used name for Lutheran congregations or churches (Am: church bodies). It may refer to:

== Church buildings ==
- Concordia Lutheran Church (Frohna, Missouri), built in 1839 in the United States
- Concordia German Evangelical Church and Rectory, formerly the Concordia Lutheran Evangelical Church, Washington, D.C., United States

== Denominations ==
- Concordia Lutheran Church (Kyrgyzstan), an unaffiliated Lutheran denomination
- Evangelical Lutheran Church "Concord", a small denomination based in Siberia in Russia
- Lutheran Church of Concord in Mozambique, an unaffiliated Lutheran denomination
- Thailand Concordia Lutheran Church, an unaffiliated Lutheran denomination
- Concordia Lutheran Church (Sweden), an unaffiliated Lutheran denomination

== See also ==
- List of Lutheran denominations
