= Pont de la Concorde =

Pont de la Concorde may refer to:

- Pont de la Concorde (Paris), a bridge crossing the Seine
- Pont de la Concorde (Montreal), a bridge crossing the St. Lawrence
