= Concord Elementary School =

Concord Elementary School is the name of multiple elementary school in the United States of America:

- Concord Elementary School (Kentucky), in McCracken County, Kentucky
- Concord Elementary School (Pittsburgh), Pennsylvania
- Concord Elementary School (South Carolina), in Anderson, South Carolina
- Concord Elementary School (Seattle), a List of landmarks in Seattle, Washington
- Concord Elementary School (Edina, Minnesota)
- Concord School (Miccosukee), in Leon County, Florida

== See also ==
- Concord (disambiguation)
