= Concordia Theatre =

Theatre in Hinckley, England

Coordinates: 52.5428°N 1.3715°W

Concordia Theatre is a theatre located on Stockwell Head in Hinckley, England. It opened its doors on 28 November 1972, with the first production at the venue being a sold-out production of The Sound of Music.

== History ==
Hinckley's 400-seat theatre is run and maintained by a dedicated band of volunteers. The theatre is home to a number of local amateur societies which stage around 30 productions each year.

These include; the Concordia Amateur Operatic Society, Stanley Opera Company, Community Guild, Broughton Astley Drama Society (BADS), Concordia Youth Theatre (CYT), Tinhatters, New Theatre Players, and Pantomime Company

The theatre was created by the transformation of a disused hosiery factory in order to solve the then Hinckley Baptist Operatic Society's lack of suitable accommodation for their productions in the late 1960s.
