= Concord (1683) =

History
- Name: Concord

Concord was the ship that in 1683 took the first group of German emigrants to America. On board of the galleon were 13 Mennonite families from Krefeld with a total of 33 people. The ship is also known as the "German Mayflower". Concord set sail on July 6, 1683, in Rotterdam under Captain William Jeffries with 57 passengers. The journey took 74 days to reach Philadelphia (Germantown) on October 6, 1683 (which was declared German-American Day in 1983).

== See also ==
- Germantown, Philadelphia#History and demographics
- German-American Day
