= Concord, Michigan =

- Village
- Village of Concord
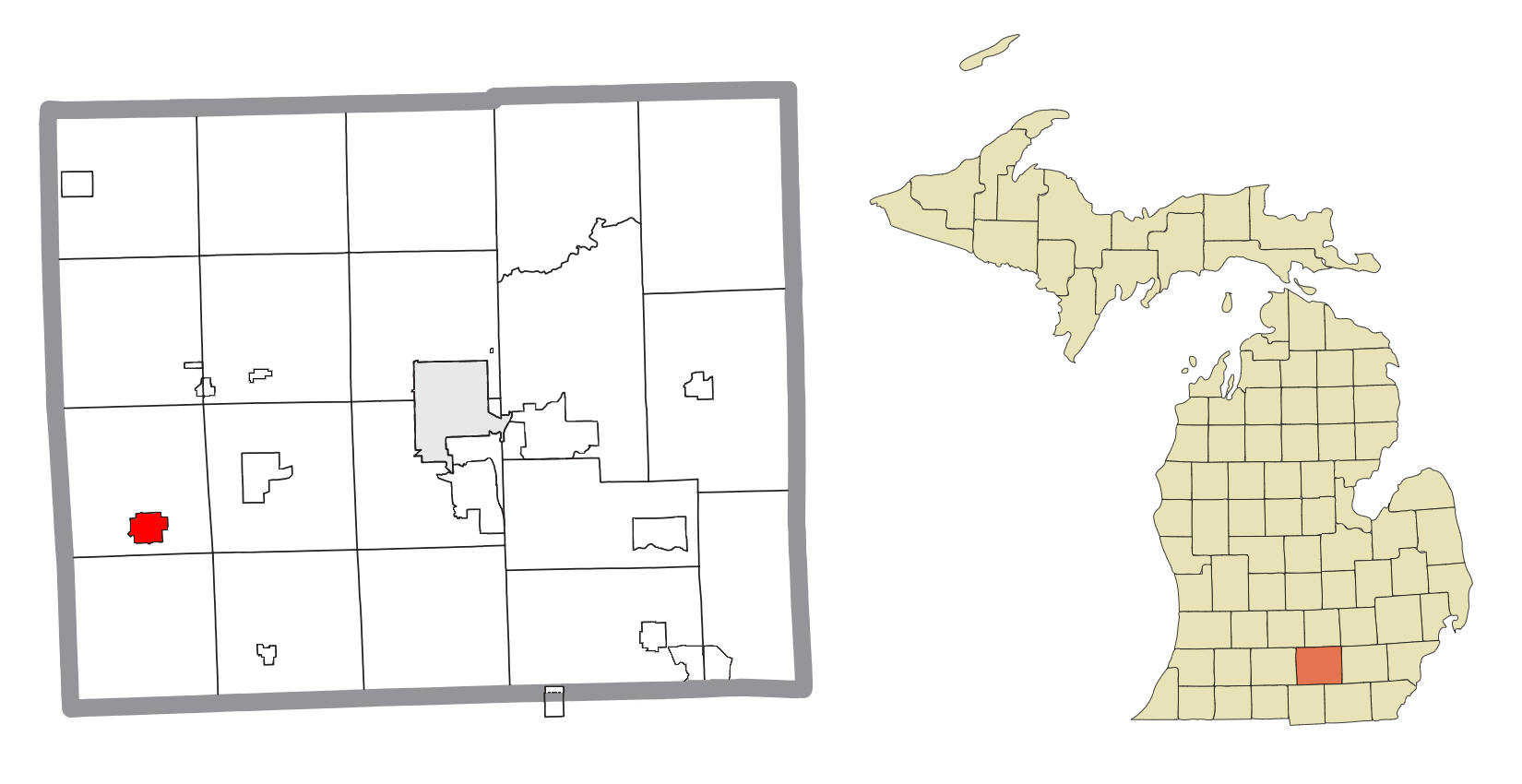
- Location within Jackson County

- Location within the state of Michigan
- Coordinates: 42°10′38″N 84°38′44″W
- Country: United States
- State: Michigan
- County: Jackson
- Township: Concord
- Settled: 1831
- Incorporated: 1871

Government
  - Type: Village council
  - President: Jeremiah Bush
  - Clerk: Judy Lefere

Area
  - Total: 1.62 sq mi (4.19 km^{2})
  - Land: 1.49 sq mi (3.87 km^{2})
  - Water: 0.12 sq mi (0.32 km^{2})
- Elevation: 1,024 ft (312 m)

Population (2020)
  - Total: 1,085
  - Density: 726.6/sq mi (280.56/km^{2})
- Time zone: UTC−5 (Eastern (EST))
  - Summer (DST): UTC−4 (EDT)
- ZIP codes(s): 49237
- Area code: 517
- FIPS code: 26-17740
- GNIS feature ID: 0623684
- Website: Official website

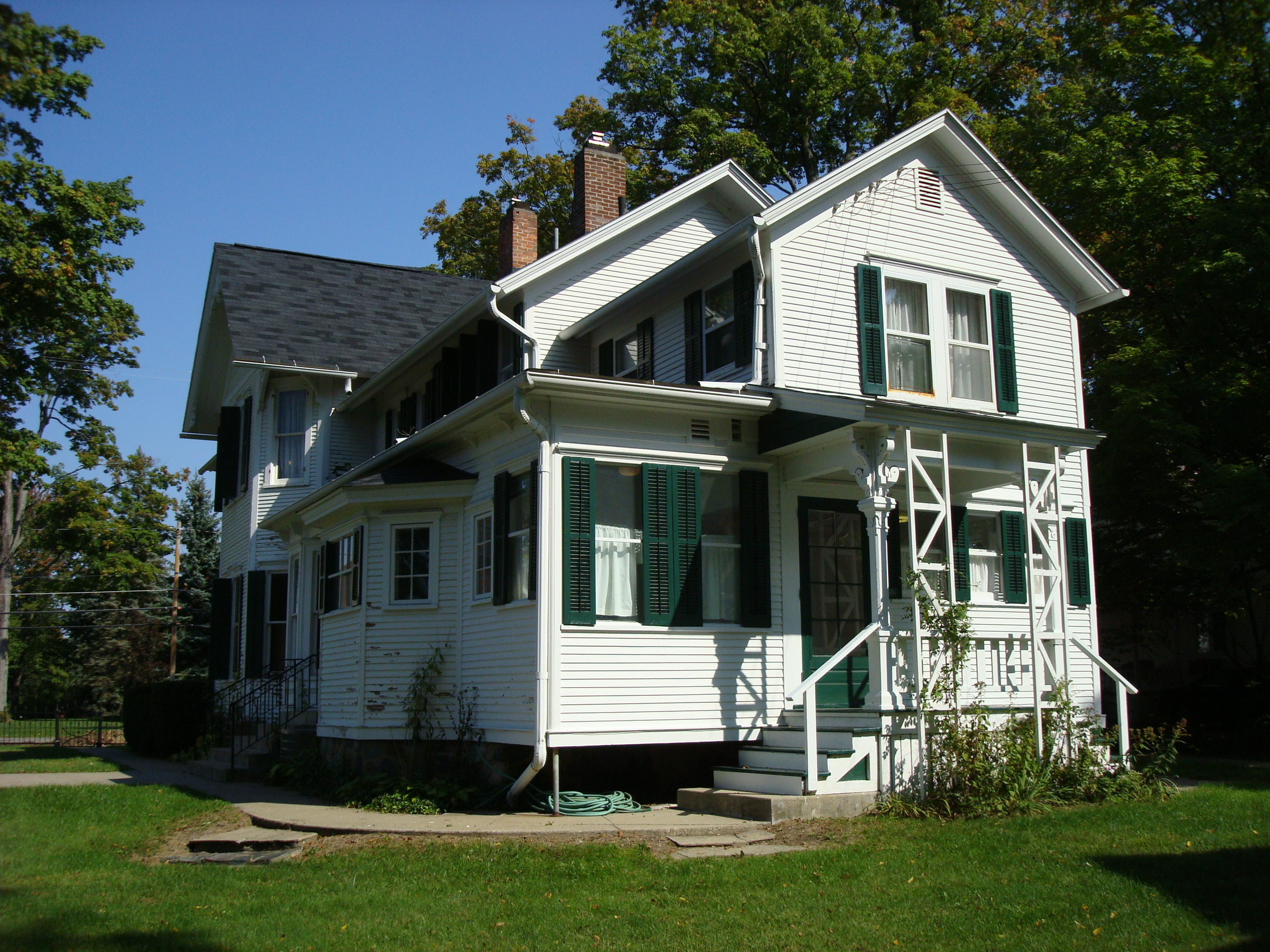
The Mann House

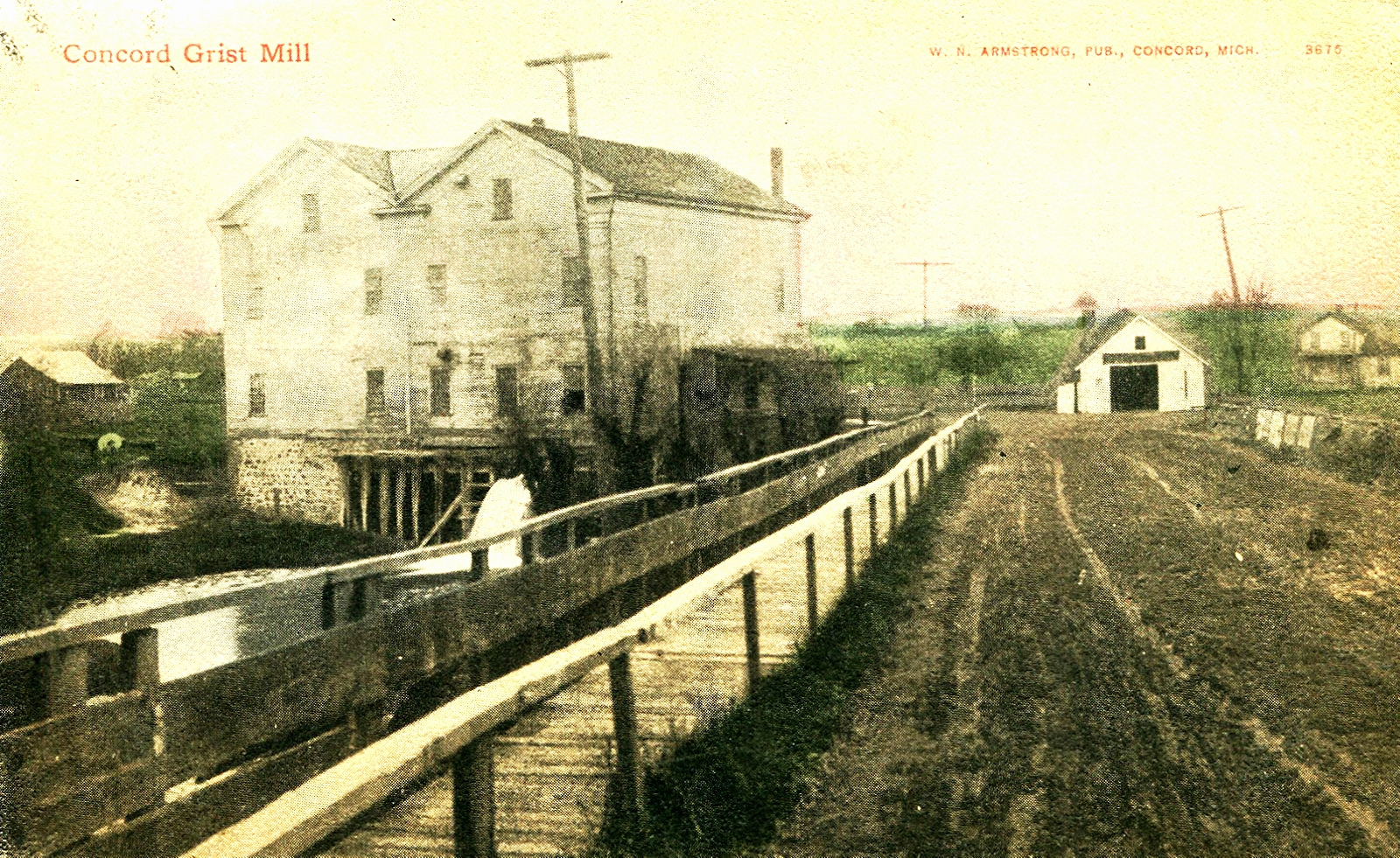
The Concord Grist Mill depicted on an early 20th-century postcard

Concord is a village in Jackson County in the U.S. state of Michigan. As of the 2020 census, Concord had a population of 1,085. The village is within Concord Township.

Settled in 1831, much of the village's downtown area is designated as part of the Concord Village Historic District. The village is located along M-60 about 15 miles (24.1 km) southwest of Jackson.

== History ==
Concord first received a post office in 1836. It was incorporated as a village in 1871.

The Michigan Historical Center operates a museum in Concord called the Mann House. The Mann House is an excellent example of typical middle-class domestic architecture of the early 1880s and features the family's sleigh and buggy as well as Jackson's Michigan State Prison made furniture.

== Government ==
Concord is a general-law village incorporated within the Concord Township.

== Geography ==
According to the United States Census Bureau, the village has a total area of 1.62 square miles (4.20 km^{2}), of which 1.50 square miles (3.88 km^{2}) is land and 0.12 square miles (0.31 km^{2}) (7.41%) is water.

The village is located within the T3S R3W survey township.

== Demographics ==
Historical population
Census	Pop.	Note	%±
1880	540		—
1890	580		7.4%
1900	534		−7.9%
1910	543		1.7%
1920	535		−1.5%
1930	603		12.7%
1940	618		2.5%
1950	730		18.1%
1960	990		35.6%
1970	983		−0.7%
1980	900		−8.4%
1990	944		4.9%
2000	1,101		16.6%
2010	1,050		−4.6%
2020	1,085		3.3%
U.S. Decennial Census

Concord Community Schools (Enrollment 900) participate in Class C and Division 4 of MHSAA athletics. Their teams are known as the Yellow Jackets and play in the Big 8 Conference. The schools' colors are purple and gold. The boys' cross country and track & field teams both claimed MHSAA State Championships during the 2009–10 school year, as well as back to back MHSAA State Championships in the 2014 and 2015 school years. In 2011 and 2012, the boys cross country team won back to back MHSAA State Championships.

=== 2010 census ===
As of the census of 2010, there were 1,050 people, 412 households, and 293 families living in the village. The population density was 700.0 inhabitants per square mile (270.3/km^{2}). There were 484 housing units at an average density of 322.7 per square mile (124.6/km^{2}). The racial makeup of the village was 99.0% White, 0.3% African American, 0.1% Native American, 0.1% Asian, 0.1% from other races, and 0.4% from two or more races. Hispanic or Latino of any race were 1.8% of the population.

There were 412 households, of which 33.7% had children under the age of 18 living with them, 54.6% were married couples living together, 10.4% had a female householder with no husband present, 6.1% had a male householder with no wife present, and 28.9% were non-families. 25.7% of all households were made up of individuals, and 12.6% had someone living alone who was 65 years of age or older. The average household size was 2.55 and the average family size was 3.02.

The median age in the village was 40.9 years. 26% of residents were under the age of 18; 8.3% were between the ages of 18 and 24; 21.4% were from 25 to 44; 28.7% were from 45 to 64; and 15.6% were 65 years of age or older. The gender makeup of the village was 48.9% male and 51.1% female.

=== 2000 census ===
As of the census of 2000, there were 1,101 people, 428 households, and 308 families living in the village. The population density was 748.4 inhabitants per square mile (289.0/km^{2}). There were 499 housing units at an average density of 339.2 per square mile (131.0/km^{2}). The racial makeup of the village was 97.91% White, 0.09% Black or African American, 0.27% Native American, 0.73% Asian, 0.64% from other races, and 0.36% from two or more races. 0.82% of the population were Hispanic or Latino of any race.

There were 428 households, out of which 34.3% had children under the age of 18 living with them, 57.9% were married couples living together, 10.7% had a female householder with no husband present, and 28.0% were non-families. 25.0% of all households were made up of individuals, and 10.5% had someone living alone who was 65 years of age or older. The average household size was 2.57 and the average family size was 3.09.

In the village, the population was spread out, with 28.1% under the age of 18, 7.5% from 18 to 24, 28.2% from 25 to 44, 21.7% from 45 to 64, and 14.5% who were 65 years of age or older. The median age was 37 years. For every 100 females, there were 92.8 males. For every 100 females age 18 and over, there were 87.7 males.

The median income for a household in the village was $46,500, and the median income for a family was $54,531. Males had a median income of $39,167 versus $23,594 for females. The per capita income for the village was $19,348. About 4.8% of families and 5.2% of the population were below the poverty line, including 3.1% of those under age 18 and 7.1% of those age 65 or over.
