= Concordia, U.S. Virgin Islands =

Concordia, Saint Croix, United States Virgin Islands
- Village
- Location within Saint Croix, U.S. Virgin Islands Location within the U.S. Virgin Islands
- Coordinates: 17.686°N 64.875°W
- Country: United States Virgin Islands
- Island: Saint Croix
- Time zone: UTC-4 (AST)

Concordia, Saint Croix is a settlement on the island of Saint Croix in the United States Virgin Islands.
