= Concord (1807 ship) =

UK merchant ship and whaler (1807–1816)

History

United Kingdom
- Name: Concord
- Owner: 1807:Haniford; 1809:Alexander Birnie & Co.
- Builder: Avery, Dartmouth
- Launched: 9 October 1807
- Fate: Wrecked November 1816

General characteristics
- Tons burthen: 150, or 15089/94 (bm)
- Complement: 18 (1811)
- Armament: 1808: 2 × 6-pounder guns; 1813: 6 × 6-pounder guns

Concord was launched at Dartmouth in 1807. From then until 1809 she traded widely. Between 1809 and 1812 two different histories emerged. The registers carried her as trading with North America. Other sources, however, have her sailing to the British Southern Whale Fishery as a sealer or whaler. She made three voyages between 1809 and 1816 in this capacity and then returned to trading. She was wrecked at the Cape of Good Hope in November 1816.

== Career ==
Concord first appeared in Lloyd's Register (LR) in 1807 with Adams, master, Haniford, owner, and trade Dartmouth–London.

=== The registers ===
The registers were only as accurate as owners chose to keep them. In Concord's case accuracy does not appear to have been a priority.

Year	Master	Owner	Trade	Source and notes
1808	Adams; P. Hanniford	Haniford	Dartmouth–London	LR
1809	Hanniford; D.Cole	Haniford; E.Barnie	London–Malta; London–Newfoundland	Register of Shipping (RS); damages repaired 1808
1810	Cole	Burney	London–Quebec	LR; damages repaired 1808
1811	D. Cole	E. Barnia	London-Newfoundland	RS
1812	Cole; T. Elder	Burney	London–Quebec; South Seas	LR; damages repaired 1808
1813	Cole; J.Elder	Birnie & Co.	London–South Seas	LR; damages repaired 1808
1814	J.Elder	Birnie & Co.	London–South Seas	LR; damages repaired 1808
1815	J.Elder	Birnie & Co.	London–South Seas	LR; damages repaired 1808
1816	J.Elder; J.Scott	Birnie & Co. Scott	London–South Seas	LR; damages repaired 1808 and thorough repair 1816

=== Whaler ===
Between 1809 and 1816, her owner was Alexander Birnie.

1st whaling/sealing voyage (1809–1811): Captain Thomas (or James) Garbutt (or Garbut) sailed from London on 23 November 1809. Concord sailed from Portsmouth on 14 January, bound for New Holland. She arrived at Port Jackson from London on 28 June 1810 with "sundries". She sailed on 31 July, bound for Rio de Janeiro and the Cape of Good Hope. She arrived at the Cape on 8 December. She returned to Port Jackson on 19 February 1811 with sundries. She then sailed on 9 March to go seal hunting. She arrived at Macquarie island in April. She left a sealing gang and returned to Port Jackson on 1 May. She sailed again for Macquarie on 1 June, arriving there on 12 July. She returned to Port Jackson on 5 October with seal skins. She next sailed on 14 November for Macquarie Island. While she was sealing off the west side of the island on 24 January 1812 one of her boats overturned and six men were drowned. She left Macquarie Island on 10 March, bound for England with 13,700 skins and 50 tons of seal oil. From Macquarie Island she sailed via Campbell Island. Concord was under the command of Captain Jarvis when she arrived at Gravesend from the South Seas on 15 September 1812; a week earlier she had arrived at Falmouth.

2nd whaling voyage (1812–1814): Captain William Elder sailed from England in October 1812. Concord arrived at Port Jackson from London on 13 July 1813, carrying merchandise. She left on 19 September for the sperm whale fishery. She was reported to have engaged in whaling around Norfolk Island.

3rd whaling voyage (1814–1816): Captain William Elder sailed in 1814. Concord, Elder, master, arrived at the Cape on 26 September 1815 from Timor. She returned to England on 20 February 1816 with 300 casks of sperm oil.

The Register of Shipping for 1816 showed Concord with Scott, master and owner, and trade London–Cape of Good Hope. On 21 July 1816 Concord, Scott, master, arrived back at Gravesend from the Cape.

== Fate ==
Concord, Scott, master, sailing from London, arrived on 4 November 1816 at Table Bay, Cape of Good Hope. There a violent storm almost immediately drove her and Woodbridge on shore. Passengers and crew were rescued, and part of the cargo was saved, though greatly damaged. By 5 November Concord was a complete loss. (Note: An earlier report of the wrecking gave the name of Concord's master as Craig, and stated that the incident had occurred in October. Woodbridge was later refloated and returned to service.)
