= Concord, Gloucester County, Virginia =

Unincorporated community in Virginia, United States

Coordinates: 37°21′49″N 76°37′07″W

Concord, Gloucester County is an unincorporated community in Gloucester County, in the U. S. state of Virginia.
