= Concord Village Historic District (Concord, Michigan) =

Historic district in Michigan, United States

- U.S. National Register of Historic Places
- U.S. Historic district
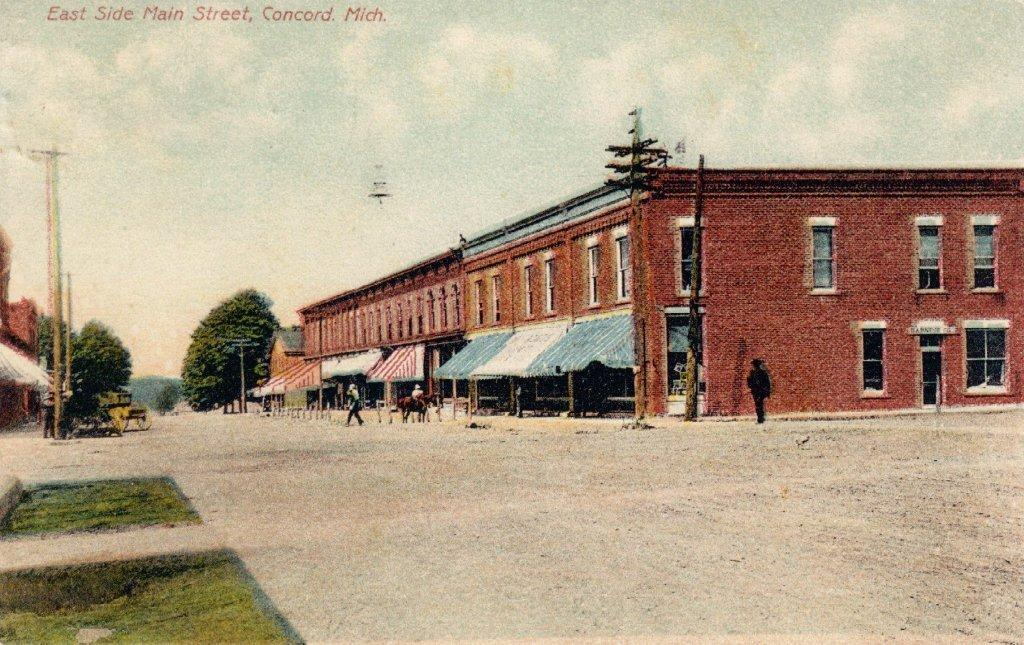
- East side of Main Street, looking north from Hanover, c. 1909

- Location within Michigan Location within the United States
- Interactive map
- Location: Roughly, Hanover St. from Spring to Michigan Sts. and N. Main St. from Railroad to Monroe Sts., Concord, Michigan
- Coordinates: 42°10′38″N 84°38′35″W
- Area: 58 acres (23 ha)
- Built: 1836
- Architectural style: Greek Revival, Gothic Revival, Italianate
- NRHP reference No.: 96000810
- Added to NRHP: July 25, 1996

The Concord Village Historic District in Concord, Michigan dates back to 1836, and consists of historic structures located along Hanover Street from Spring to Michigan Streets and North Main Street from Railroad to Monroe Streets. It was listed on the National Register of Historic Places in 1996.

== History ==
The village of Concord was first settled in the early 1830s by William Van Fossen and Thomas McGee. The village itself was platted in 1836 by Isaac Swain, a wealthy local farmer. A flour mill was built by Isaac and William Van Fossen on the north side of the river in 1837 and became the foundation of the local economy for the next few decades. Concord became a small village as more settlers arrived and built houses. A small business district, primarily in wooden buildings, grew along Main Street.

In 1871, the Michigan Air Line Railroad between Jackson and Niles was built. The track was leased by the Michigan Central Railroad, and eventually became part of the New York Central Railroad. The availability of transportation spurred growth in Concord, and local agriculture boomed. In addition, small industries sprang up in the area around the mill. The railroad also heralded a residential building boom, with about fifty houses constructed in Concord in the early 1870s. At the same time, the wood-frame buildings in the villages' commercial district were slowly replaced with one and two-story brick commercial buildings. Toward the end of the 1800s, a series of fires destroyed most of the remaining wooden commercial buildings in the district.

As the automobile rose in the 1900s, the railroad died out. Some auto-related businesses opened in the village, but the main highway (now M-60) was routed several blocks north of the downtown in the 1930s, and the district avoided the intrusion of auto-related businesses of the later twentieth century.

== Description ==
The Concord Village Historic District contains the entire historic commercial district of Concord, Michigan, as well as the surrounding early residential development. The district encompasses a cross-shaped area extending along the two main intersecting roads of the village: Hanover and Main Streets. In 1996, the district included 120 structures, of which 106 were contributing buildings. It includes two separately-NRHP-listed properties: the Mann House and the Paddock-Hubbard House.

The district is divided among commercial structures (primarily one- and two-story brick commercial Italianate buildings dating from the late nineteenth and early twentieth century) and residential structures. The residential structures are primarily wood-framed single-family homes, ranging from vernacular Greek Revival, Gothic Revival, and Italianate, to Craftsmen designs. The district also contains three churches.

Significant structures in the district include:

- Joer's Farm Center/Mill (206 North Main) This mill was constructed in 1920, replacing a Greek Revival mill that burned in 1919. The mill is a three-story, gabled roof structure with a single concrete main house.
- Farmers State Bank (101 South Main) Constructed in 1900, this building is a relatively rare building style: a one-story, flat iron and tower, glazed brick structures on a dressed stone foundation.
- The Woodmen Hall/Opera House (108 South Main) Concord's Opera House is a two-story, false front, brick Italianate structure noted for its three oculus windows and massive fieldstone foundation.
- Hamlin Tyler House (205 South Main) Built in 1847, this one-and-one-half-story coursed cobblestone house with a mansard roof house is the only cobblestone structure in Concord, and one of only about fifty such houses in Michigan.
- Spratt House (303 South Main) This two-story Italianate structure was constructed in 1876 for William Harvey Spratt, Jr., a successful commission grain dealer.
- Goodwin House (214 Homer) This one-story Greek Revival house with a second-story monitor was constructed in the 1850s for William Goodwin and his wife Mary (Granger) Goodwin.
- Universalist Church (200 Hanover) The First Universalist Church (1866) is a New England–style church with box pews and two aisles. It was built by a Universalist Society formed by 13 families in 1854, which first met in the Paddock-Hubbard House.
- First Presbyterian Church (201 Hanover) This church was constructed in 1911, using the original stone foundation of an earlier church that burned in 1909.
- Mann House (205 Hanover) A two-and-one-half-story cross-gabled Eastlake structure constructed in 1883-84 by local architect/builder Thomas McKenzie.
- Paddock-Hubbard House (317 Hanover) This one-story Greek Revival house with a second-story monitor was constructed in 1846 by the same builders who constructed the Goodwin House.
- Chapple House (436 Hanover) This house was built in 1890 for Percy Chapple by Thomas McKenzie, and is similar in style to the Mann House.

== Gallery ==
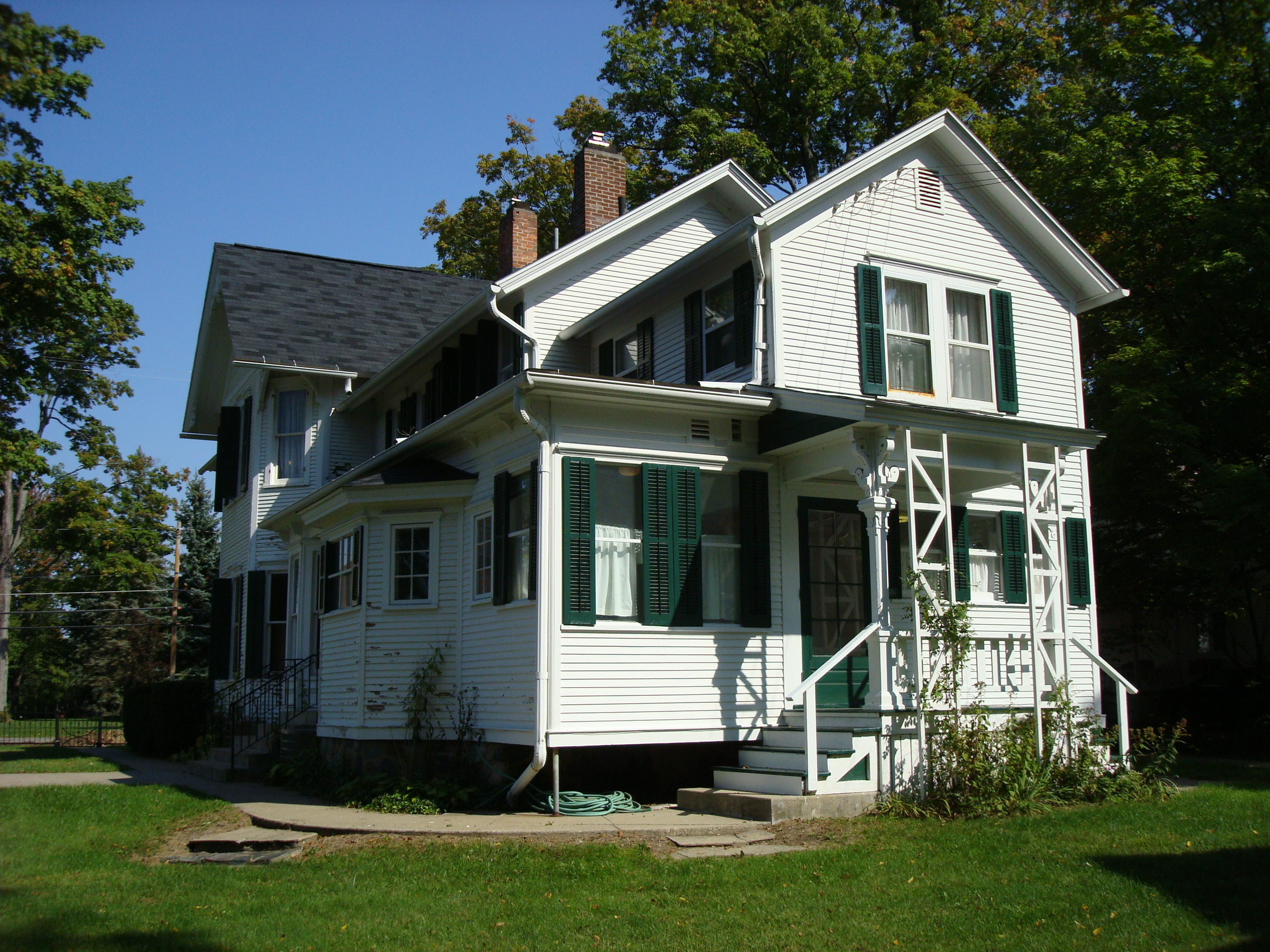
Mann House

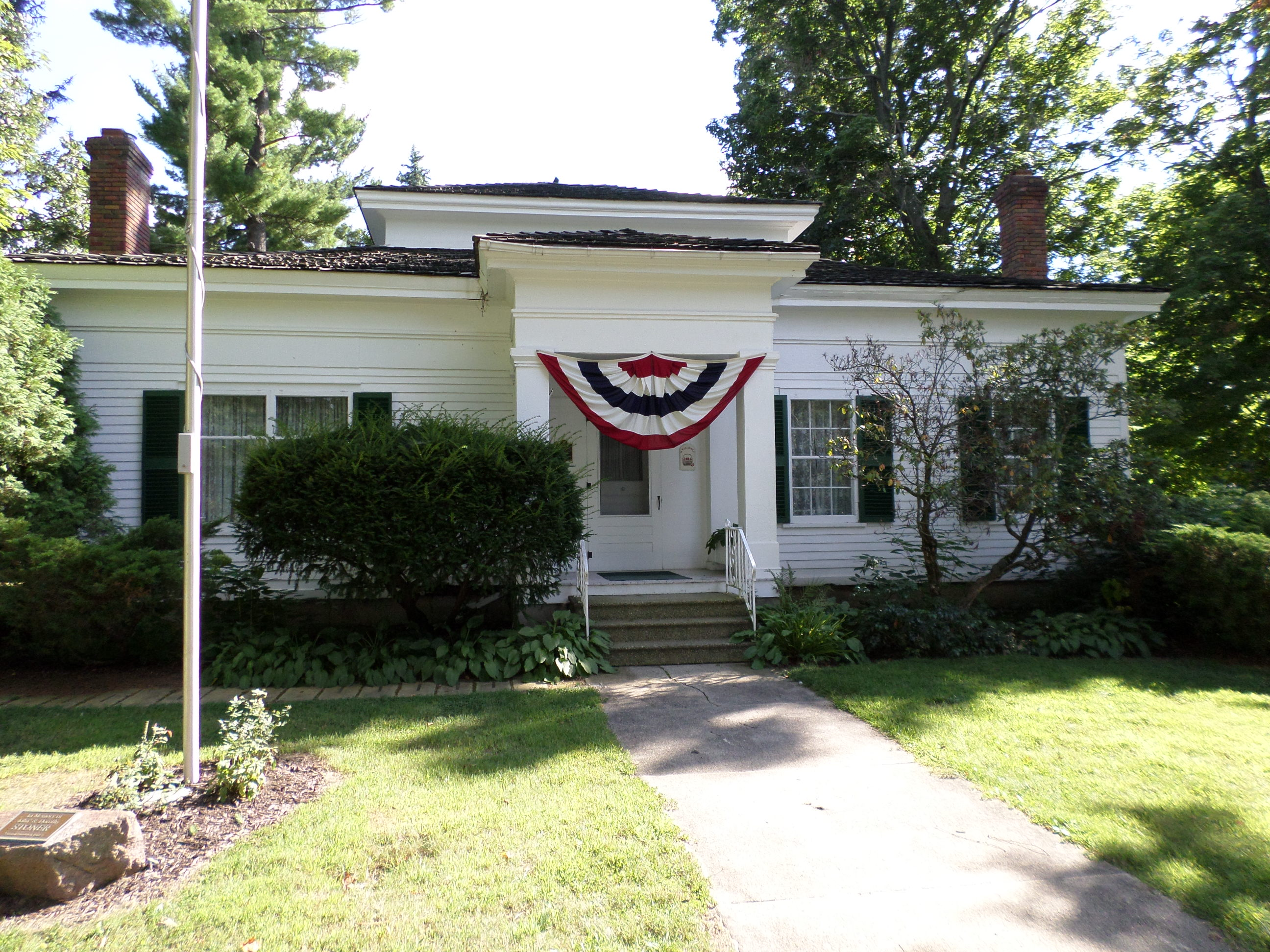
Paddock-Hubbard House
