= Concordia, Saint John, U.S. Virgin Islands =

Coordinates: 18.31051°N 64.70652°W

Concordia is an area on the island of Saint John in the United States Virgin Islands. It is located on the south east corner of the island, near Salt Pond Bay. Much of the area is part of Virgin Islands National Park. Concordia Eco-Resort is located here.
