= Concordance =

Concordance may refer to:

- Agreement (linguistics), a form of cross-reference between different parts of a sentence or phrase
- Bible concordance, an alphabetical listing of terms in the Bible
- Concordant coastline, in geology, where beds, or layers, of differing rock types form ridges that run parallel to the coast
- Concordant pair, in statistics
- Concordance (publishing), a list of words used in a body of work, with their immediate contexts
- Concordance (genetics), the presence of the same trait in both members of a pair of twins (or set of individuals)
- Concordance (medicine), involvement of patients in decision-making to improve patient compliance with medical advice
- Concordance of evidence, in law, science, history, etc.
- Concordance system, in Swiss politics, inclusion of everyone, manifested by the presence of all major parties in the Federal Council
- Concordance correlation coefficient, in statistics, a measurement of the agreement between two variables
- Concordance database, a database tailored to legal applications and distributed by LexisNexis
- Inter-rater reliability, in statistics, the degree to which multiple measurements of the same thing are similar
- Lambda-CDM model of big-bang cosmology
- Link concordance, a relation between mathematical links in knot theory
