= HMS Concord =

Five ships of the Royal Navy have borne the name Concord, or the French variant, HMS Concorde:

- English ship Concord (1649) was a 24-gun ship captured from the Dutch in 1649. She was hulked in 1653 and was sold in 1659.
- HMS Concord (1697) was a sloop captured from the French in 1697 and removed from service before 1699.
- HMS Concorde (1783) was a 36-gun fifth rate, captured from the French in 1783 by HMS Magnificent, and sold in 1811.
- HMS Concord (1916) was a C-class light cruiser launched in 1916 and scrapped in 1935.
- HMS Concord (R63) was a C-class destroyer, launched in 1945 as HMS Corso, but renamed in 1946. She was broken up in 1962.

== See also ==
- USS Concord
