= Concordia Academy (Austin, Texas) =

Concordia High School

Location
- 1201 S. Heatherwilde Blvd. Austin, Texas 78660; United States
- 30°17′35″N 97°43′25″W

Information
- Type: Private high school
- Motto: Concordia High School prepares students to navigate a dynamic world by building positive, life-defining relationships, equipping students to think critically, and rooting their identity in Christ.
- Religious affiliation: Lutheran
- Established: 2002; 24 years ago
- Administrator: Head of School-Mr. Steve Glandorf, M.Ed.
- Principal: Dr. Marianne Rader, M.S, M.Ed.
- Grades: 9-12
- Enrollment: 120-140
- Colors: Black, white and red
- Athletics conference: TAPPS 3A
- Mascot: Cardinal
- Website: www.chsaustin.org

Concordia High School (formerly known as Concordia Academy) is a private Christian high school in Pflugerville, Texas. The school is the only Lutheran high school in the greater Austin area. Founded in 2002, Concordia High School is a Christian, accredited, college preparatory school.

The AP courses offered are: AP Calculus, AP Economics, AP Physics B, and AP US History. Dual credit classes are also offered and vary by year. Currently ten sports are offered: cheer, football, cross country, soccer, volleyball, basketball, baseball, tennis, golf, and track. Extracurricular activities include band, choir, drama, art, Science Olympiad, National Honor Society, yearbook, TAPPS academic competition, student council, and class retreats. Before the start of classes every August, the new freshman class goes to Camp Lone Star to ease the transition from middle to high school. Prom is hosted every year by the Junior class for the Juniors and Seniors to celebrate the end of the school year.
