= USS Concord =

USS Concord may refer to:

- USS Concord (1828), a sloop-of-war launched in 1828, and lost when she ran aground on a sand bar off Mozambique
- USS Concord (PG-3), a patrol gunboat in service from 1890 to 1909, and participated in the Battle of Manila Bay
- USS Concord (SP-773), a tugboat purchased in 1917, renamed Mendota (YT-3) in 1920, then to Muscotah in 1932, and placed out of service in 1934
- USS Concord (CL-10), a light cruiser commissioned in 1923, a participant in World War II, and decommissioned in December 1945
- USS Concord (AFS-5), a combat stores ship commissioned in 1968, decommissioned and assigned to Military Sealift Command as USNS Concord (T-AFS-5), and out of service in 2009

== See also ==
- HMS Concord
