= Concorde (disambiguation) =

Concorde is a supersonic aircraft.

Concorde may also refer to:

- Concorde (pear), a cultivar of the European Pear

== Transport ==
- Chrysler Concorde, an automobile model
- HMS Concorde, originally a French naval frigate, captured by the British Royal Navy in 1783
- La Concorde de Nantes, flagship of the pirate Blackbeard

== Places and buildings ==
- Concorde station, a Paris Metro station named after the nearby Place de la Concorde
- De la Concorde station, a Montreal Metro and commuter train station in Laval, Quebec
- Hôtel Le Concorde, Québec
- Le Concorde Tower, Huai Khwang District, Bangkok
  - Swissôtel Le Concorde, Swissôtel in the Le Concorde Tower, Bangkok
- Concorde Hotel Kuala Lumpur, Malaysia

== Music ==
- Concorde (album), a 1955 album by the Modern Jazz Quartet
- Concorde, short for Concorde Contemporary Music Ensemble
- Le Concorde (band), American indie pop band
- "La Concorde", the national anthem of Gabon
- "Concorde", a song from Black Country, New Road's album Ants from Up There
- Concorde, a french indie new wave pop band

== Other ==
- Concorde TSP Solver, a piece of software
- The Concorde ... Airport '79, a 1979 film

== See also ==
- Concord (disambiguation)
- Concorde Agreement
- Concordia (disambiguation)
