= Concord, Brunswick County, Virginia =

Unincorporated community in Virginia, United States

Coordinates: 36°57′26″N 77°47′55″W

Concord, Brunswick County is an unincorporated community located in Brunswick County, in the U.S. state of Virginia.
