= Concordia Academy =

Concordia Academy may refer to:

- Concordia Academy (Minnesota)
- Concordia Academy (Austin, Texas)
- Concordia Academy (Moncton, New Brunswick)
