= Concordia Lutheran High School =

Concordia Lutheran High School may refer to:

- Concordia Lutheran High School (Fort Wayne, Indiana)
- Concordia Lutheran High School (Texas), Tomball, Texas
