= Concordia Normal School =

Normal school in Concordia, Kansas, US

Concordia Normal School located in Concordia, Kansas, was a state-funded normal school operated by the Kansas state government from 1874 until 1876.

Concordia Normal began on March 10, 1874, with Professor E. F. Robinson as the Principal. The school opened for students on September 16 that same year. In 1875, former State Superintendent H. D. McCarty was named president of the college. Sixty-six students were enrolled in the first year and in 1875 enrollment more than doubled to 171 students.

Some in the area and in the state government felt the opening of the school was premature due to lack of development in the area, a recent grasshopper infestation and drought. Depending upon state aid, the school closed on March 18, 1878 (a little before that of the Leavenworth Normal School). Following the "Miscellaneous appropriations bill of 1876" state normal schools were then consolidated to what is now Emporia State University.
