= National Register of Historic Places listings in Jackson County, Michigan =

Location of Jackson County in Michigan

This is a list of the National Register of Historic Places listings in Jackson County, Michigan.

This is intended to be a complete list of the properties and districts on the National Register of Historic Places in Jackson County, Michigan, United States. Latitude and longitude coordinates are provided for many National Register properties and districts; these locations may be seen together in a map.

There are 29 properties and districts listed on the National Register in the county.

This National Park Service list is complete through NPS recent listings posted September 4, 2026.

== Current listings ==
	Name on the Register	Image	Date listed	Location	City or town	Description
1	Clark-Stringham Site		June 19, 1973 (#73002154)	Address restricted 42°21′30″N 84°24′30″W	Jackson	Also designated 20-JA-37.
2	Collins Manufacturing–Jackson Automobile Company Complex	Collins Manufacturing–Jackson Automobile Company Complex	July 9, 1993 (#93000622)	2301 E. Michigan Ave. 42°15′09″N 84°22′32″W	Jackson	Now known as the Commercial Exchange Building
3	Concord Village Historic District	Concord Village Historic District	July 25, 1996 (#96000810)	Roughly Hanover St. from Spring to Michigan Sts. and N. Main St. from Railroad to Monroe Sts. 42°10′38″N 84°38′35″W	Concord	
4	Denton Road-Sparks Foundation Park Pond Bridge	Denton Road-Sparks Foundation Park Pond Bridge	January 28, 2000 (#99001676)	Denton Rd. over Sparks Foundation Park Pond; 42°13′38″N 84°25′55″W	Jackson	
5	First Congregational Church	First Congregational Church	July 10, 2017 (#100001294)	120 N. Jackson St. 42°14′54″N 84°24′32″W	Jackson	
6	Ford Motor Company Brooklyn Plant	Ford Motor Company Brooklyn Plant	January 12, 2017 (#100000532)	221 Mill St. 42°06′35″N 84°14′43″W	Brooklyn	
7	Grass Lake Public School	Grass Lake Public School	May 31, 1984 (#84001693)	661 E. Michigan Ave. 42°15′06″N 84°12′16″W	Grass Lake	
8	Hanover High School Complex	Hanover High School Complex	December 12, 2012 (#12001030)	105 Fairview St. 42°06′07″N 84°32′50″W	Hanover	Currently houses the Lee Conklin Antique Reed Organ & History Museum
9	Hayes Hotel	Hayes Hotel	March 19, 2024 (#100010157)	226-234 West Michigan Avenue; 42°14′52″N 84°24′37″W	Jackson	
10	Hebrew Cemetery	Hebrew Cemetery	June 24, 2009 (#09000474)	420 N. West Ave. 42°15′09″N 84°25′24″W	Jackson	Also known as the Temple Beth Israel Cemetery
11	Gordon Hitt Farmstead	Gordon Hitt Farmstead	July 22, 1994 (#94000743)	4561 N. Lake Rd. 42°07′27″N 84°20′04″W	Columbia Township	
12	Jackson District Library	Jackson District Library	March 10, 1980 (#80001873)	244 W. Michigan St. 42°14′53″N 84°24′40″W	Jackson	
13	James M. Jameson Farm	James M. Jameson Farm	July 15, 1980 (#80001875)	East of Springport at 10220 N. Parma Rd. 42°22′49″N 84°36′02″W	Springport	
14	Frederick A., Jr. and Caroline Hewett Kennedy Farm		December 21, 2000 (#00000643)	8490 Hanover Rd. 42°06′05″N 84°33′56″W	Hanover Township	
15	Kentucky Homestead	Kentucky Homestead	July 1, 1994 (#94000663)	3740 Ocean Beach Rd. 42°07′25″N 84°18′13″W	Columbia Township	Moved to a county park on the northeast side of Clark Lake. Currently used as the Clark Lake Community Center.
16	M-50-Sandstone Creek Bridge	M-50-Sandstone Creek Bridge	January 14, 2000 (#99001674)	M-50 over Sandstone Creek; 42°22′23″N 84°32′42″W	Tompkins Township	
17	Mann House	Mann House	October 15, 1970 (#70000273)	205 Hanover St. 42°10′40″N 84°38′36″W	Concord	
18	Michigan Central Railroad Jackson Depot	Michigan Central Railroad Jackson Depot	December 12, 2002 (#02001504)	501 E. Michigan Ave., 42°14′52″N 84°23′58″W	Jackson	
19	Michigan State Prison	Michigan State Prison	August 10, 1979 (#79001156)	Armory Court and Cooper St. 42°15′27″N 84°24′21″W	Jackson	
20	Michigan Theater	Michigan Theater	May 8, 1980 (#80001874)	124 N. Mechanic St. 42°14′53″N 84°24′22″W	Jackson	
21	Mill Street-South Branch Raisin River Bridge	Mill Street-South Branch Raisin River Bridge	January 14, 2000 (#99001675)	Mill St. over the South Branch of the Raisin River; 42°06′36″N 84°14′44″W	Brooklyn	
22	Otsego Hotel	Otsego Hotel	April 20, 2015 (#15000158)	102–106 Francis St. 42°14′50″N 84°24′16″W	Jackson	
23	Paddock-Hubbard House	Paddock-Hubbard House	December 9, 1994 (#94001429)	317 Hanover St. 42°10′40″N 84°38′25″W	Concord	
24	Peoples National Bank Building	Peoples National Bank Building	December 2, 2014 (#14000977)	101 E. Michigan Ave. 42°14′50″N 84°24′21″W	Jackson	
25	Hugh H. Richard House	Hugh H. Richard House	December 2, 1993 (#93001352)	505 Wildwood Ave. 42°14′53″N 84°25′01″W	Jackson	
26	Ella Sharp House	Ella Sharp House	August 25, 1972 (#72000622)	3225 4th St. 42°12′54″N 84°25′04″W	Jackson	Now the Ella Sharp Museum
27	Siebold Farm/Ruehle (Realy) Farm	Siebold Farm/Ruehle (Realy) Farm	March 30, 1973 (#73000952)	9998 Waterloo-Munith Rd. 42°22′46″N 84°10′48″W	Waterloo Township	Now the Waterloo Farm Museum
28	Stone Post Office	Stone Post Office	March 16, 1972 (#72000623)	Rear of 125 N. Jackson St. 42°14′53″N 84°24′30″W	Jackson	
29	Henry and Aurora (Walker) Vinkle House	Henry and Aurora (Walker) Vinkle House	July 31, 2017 (#100001391)	371 W. Michigan Ave. 42°14′56″N 84°13′07″W	Grass Lake	Also known as the Coe House
30	Andrew Wilcox House	Andrew Wilcox House	December 14, 1987 (#87002138)	231 E. High St. 42°13′58″N 84°23′54″W	Jackson	

== Former listing ==
	Name on the Register	Image	Date listed	Date removed	Location	City or town	Description
1	Sidney T. Smith House	Sidney T. Smith House	January 13, 1972 (#72001590)	January 11, 1978	Michigan Ave. 42°15′24″N 84°10′41″W	Grass Lake	Demolished.

== See also ==
- List of Michigan State Historic Sites in Jackson County, Michigan
- List of National Historic Landmarks in Michigan
- National Register of Historic Places listings in Michigan
- Listings in neighboring counties: Calhoun, Eaton, Hillsdale, Ingham, Lenawee, Livingston, Washtenaw
