= List of Michigan State Historic Sites in Jackson County =

Location of Jackson County in Michigan

The following is a list of Michigan State Historic Sites in Jackson County, Michigan. Sites marked with a dagger (†) are also listed on the National Register of Historic Places in Jackson County, Michigan.

== Current listings ==
Name	Image	Location	City	Listing date
All Saints' Episcopal Church		151 Main Street at the head of Marshall Street	Brooklyn	July 17, 1997
Blackman Township Fractional District No. 4 School		3091 Blackman Road	Jackson	October 17, 1996
Governor Austin Blair Informational Designation		600 Greenwood Avenue	Jackson	February 15, 1984
Brooklyn First Presbyterian Church		160 North Main Street	Brooklyn	November 2, 1980
Brooklyn's Founder Informational Designation		Village Square on M-50	Brooklyn	February 14, 1963
William G. Brown House		6770 Brown Road	Parma vicinity	November 16, 1982
Eleazer Clark Homestead		1916 Norvell Road	Grass Lake vicinity	January 27, 1983
Edward and Edith Cross Farm		321 Teft Road, 1/4 mile south of M-60	Spring Arbor	June 28, 2001
First Congregational Church†		120 North Jackson Street	Jackson	May 15, 1987
First State Prison Informational Designation		National Guard Armory, north end of Mechanic Street	Jackson	January 24, 1958
Hanover High School (now used as the Lee Conklin Organ Museum)†		105 Fairview Street	Hanover	July 18, 1996
Horton Methodist Episcopal Church		101 Main Street	Horton	October 23, 1979
Horace Ismon Building		171 West Michigan Avenue	Jackson	July 17, 1997
The Jackson Area Informational Designation		Rest Area, westbound I-94, west of Mt. Hope Road	Grass Lake	January 16, 1962
Jackson District Library†		244 Michigan Avenue	Jackson	August 3, 1979
Jackson First Baptist Church		201 South Jackson Street	Jackson	June 15, 1984
Jacksonburg Public Square Informational Designation		NE Corner of Michigan Avenue and Jackson Street	Jackson	April 16, 1992
James M. Jameson Farm†		10220 North Parma Road, NW corner of Pope Church Road	Springport vicinity	March 18, 1982
Frederick A. Jr., and Caroline Hewett Kennedy Farm†		8490 Hanover Road	Hanover	March 19, 1992
John King Farm Complex		2484 Berry Road	Rives Township	August 21, 1987
Lake Shore and Michigan Southern Railroad Springport Depot		Railroad Street north of M-99	Springport	November 26, 1985
Mann House†		205 Hanover Street	Concord	June 18, 1970
McCain School		3517 McCain Road	Summit Township	February 23, 1981
Michigan Central Railroad Grass Lake Depot		210 East Michigan Avenue	Grass Lake	May 21, 1992
Michigan Theater†		124 Mechanic Street	Jackson	April 24, 1979
Mount Evergreen Cemetery		1047 Greenwood	Jackson	November 1, 1988
Paddock-Hubbard House†		317 Hanover Street	Concord	December 19, 1991
Railroad Conspiracy Case of 1851 Informational Designation				September 17, 1957
Berthold S. Rummler House		122 West Wilkins Street	Jackson	January 8, 1981
Saint John's Church		711 Cooper Street	Jackson	April 4, 1978
Saint Mary Star of the Sea Church		NE corner of Wesley and S Mechanic streets	Jackson	February 23, 1981
Saint Paul's Episcopal Church		309 South Jackson Street	Jackson	March 28, 1985
Ella Sharp House†		3225 Fourth Street	Jackson	August 13, 1971
Siebold Farm / Ruehle (Realy) Farm†		9998 Waterloo-Munith Road	Waterloo Township	October 29, 1971
Chauncey C. Smith House		6134 Wolf Lake Road	Napoleon	August 20, 1992
Sidney T. Smith House (Demolished, NR delisted 1990)		12880 Michigan Avenue	Grass Lake	January 22, 1971
Spring Arbor College Informational Designation		Spring Arbor University Campus, Main Street (M-60)	Spring Arbor	July 10, 1963
Spring Arbor Commemorative Designation		Southwest corner of Hammond and Cross Roads	Spring Arbor	March 17, 1994
Stone Post Office†		125 Jackson	Jackson	August 13, 1971
John Timbers House		201 East Main Street	Spring Arbor	February 15, 1990
Under the Oaks Commemorative Designation		Northwest corner of Second and West Franklin Streets	Jackson	February 18, 1956
Universalist Church		200 Hanover	Concord	July 15, 1999
Wellman General Store		205 Main Street	Horton	September 10, 1979
Andrew Wilcox House†		231 High Street	Jackson	February 26, 1985
Thomas Wilson House		3600 Vrooman Road	Summit Township	May 17, 1978
Soloman Wolcott House		6707 Cross Road	Horton	November 15, 1990

== See also ==
- National Register of Historic Places listings in Jackson County, Michigan

== Sources ==
- Historic Sites Online – Jackson County. Michigan State Housing Developmental Authority. Accessed February 27, 2011.
