= Gunther Plaut =

German-born Canadian rabbi (1912–2012)

Rabbi Wolf Gunther Plaut C.C., O.Ont.
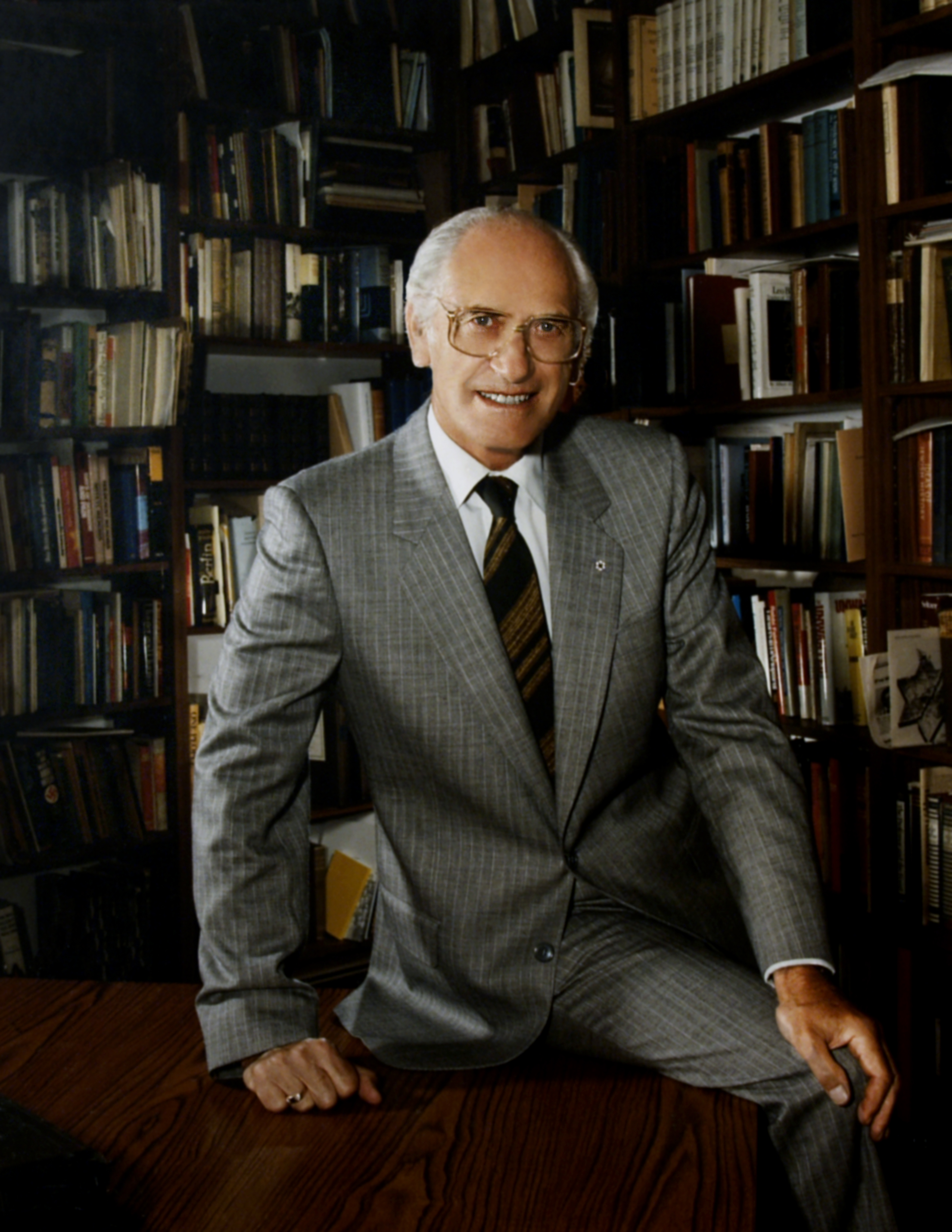

Personal life
- Born: November 1, 1912 Münster, Germany
- Died: February 8, 2012 (aged 99) Toronto, Ontario, Canada
- Children: Jonathan V. Plaut and Judith Plaut

Religious life
- Religion: Judaism
- Denomination: Reform

Jewish leader
- Position: Rabbi Emeritus
- Synagogue: Holy Blossom Temple
- Residence: Canada
- Semikhah: Hebrew Union College

Wolf Gunther Plaut (November 1, 1912 – February 8, 2012) was an American Reform rabbi and author of a Torah commentary who was based in Canada. Plaut was the rabbi of Holy Blossom Temple in Toronto for several decades and from 1978 was its senior scholar.

== Early life and education ==
He was born in Münster, Germany. His father's name was Jonas and his mother's name was Selma. Gunther had a younger brother, Walter, who was the Rabbi of Temple Emanuel of Great Neck, NY at the time of his death in 1964 at the age of 44. Gunther received his Doctor of Laws degree in 1934, and in 1935 fled the Nazis and went to the United States. In 1939, he received his ordination as a Rabbi from Hebrew Union College.

== Career ==
After receiving his U.S. citizenship on March 31, 1943, he enlisted as a chaplain in the U.S. Army. He was eventually assigned to the 104th Infantry "Timberwolf" Division and served as a frontline chaplain with the 104th in Belgium and Germany. He held pulpits in Chicago, Illinois (1939-49) and at Mount Zion Temple in St. Paul, Minnesota (1948–1961). He moved to Holy Blossom Temple in 1961, replacing Abraham Feinberg.

He published a volume of commentary on the Torah and Haftarah, which has become the standard Humash used by the Reform movement. He was a long-time columnist for the Canadian Jewish News as well as a contributor of opinion pieces to various Canadian newspapers such as The Globe and Mail and the Toronto Star. He was the first recipient of the W. Gunther Plaut Humanitarian Award. In 1978, he was the honoree of the Toronto Jewish National Fund Negev Dinner.

He was president of the Canadian Jewish Congress from 1977 to 1980, and was also vice-chair of the Ontario Human Rights Commission. In 1983, he was elected president of the Central Conference of American Rabbis, the international association for Reform rabbis.

In 1978 he was made an Officer of the Order of Canada and was promoted to Companion in 1999. In 1993, he was awarded the Order of Ontario. In 1999, he received the Commander's Cross (Komturkreuz) of the Order of Merit of the Federal Republic of Germany.

== Personal life and death ==
Plaut married Elizabeth Strauss in 1938, and they remained married until her death in 2003. His son, Jonathan V. Plaut, was also a Reform rabbi, who served as rabbi of Temple Beth Israel in Jackson, Michigan. His nephew, Rabbi Joshua Eli Plaut, Ph.D (son of Rabbi Walter H. and Hadassah Y. Plaut) is the director of the New York City based American Friends of Rabin Medical Center.

Plaut was diagnosed with Alzheimer's disease in 2002, and withdrew from all public activities. In February 2012, he died at Baycrest Hospital in Toronto, Ontario, Canada at the age of 99.

== Selected works ==
- Die materielle Eheungültigkeit (The material marriage annulment) (doctoral dissertation, 1934)
- High Holiday Services for Children (1952)
- Mount Zion – The First Hundred Years (1956)
- The Jews in Minnesota; the first seventy-five years (1959) 59-14710
- The Book of Proverbs – A Commentary (1961) 61-9760
- Judaism and the Scientific Spirit (1962) 61-17139
- The Rise of Reform Judaism: A Sourcebook of its European Origins. New York: World Union for Progressive Judaism. 1963. OCLC 39869725. 63-13568
- The Case for the Chosen People – The Role of the Jewish People Yesterday and Today (1965) 65-19869
- The Growth of Reform Judaism (1965) 65-18555
- Your Neighbour is a Jew (1967)
- The Sabbath as Protest: Thoughts on Work and Leisure in the Automated Society (1970)
- Page Two – Ten Years of "News and Views." (1971)
- A Shabbat Manual (1972) 72-10299
- Genesis. The Torah, A Modern Commentary, Vol. I (1974)
- Exodus. The Torah, A Modern Commentary, Vol. II
- Time to Think (1977)
- Hanging Threads: Stories Real and Surreal (1978) ISBN 0-919630-99-5. Published in U.S. as The Man in the Blue Vest and Other Stories (1978) ISBN 0-8008-5093-9
- Numbers. The Torah, A Modern Commentary, Vol. IV (1979) ISBN 0-8074-0039-4
- Unfinished business: an Autobiography (1981), ISBN 0-919630-41-3
- The Torah: A Modern Commentary (1981), ISBN 0-8074-0055-6
- Deuteronomy. The Torah, A Modern Commentary, Vol. V (1983)
- Refugee Determination in Canada (1985)
- The Letter (1986) ISBN 0-7710-7164-7
- A Modern Commentary – Genesis (1988) (in Hebrew)
- The Man Who Would Be Messiah: A Biographical Novel (1990), ISBN 0-88962-400-3
- The Magen David – How the Six-Pointed Star Became an Emblem for The Jewish People (1991) ISBN 0-910250-16-2
- German-Jewish Bible Translations: linguistic theology as a political phenomenon (1992)
- Asylum: A Moral Dilemma (1995), ISBN 0-275-95196-0
- The Haftarah Commentary (1996) ISBN 0-8074-0551-5
- More Unfinished Business (1997), ISBN 0-8020-0888-7
- Teshuvot for the Nineties: Reform Judaism's Answers to Today's Dilemmas (1997) ISBN 0-88123-071-5
- The Price and Privilege of Growing Old (2000) ISBN 0-88123-081-2
- Meyer, Michael A.; Plaut, W. Gunther (2001). The Reform Judaism Reader: North American Documents (PDF). New York: UAHC Press. ISBN 0-8074-0732-1.
- Die Torah in Jüdischer Auslegung (in German) (1999–2004)
- The Torah: A Modern Commentary, Revised Edition (ISBN 0-8074-0883-2)
- One Voice: The Selected Sermons of W. Gunther Plaut (2007) ISBN 978-1-55002-739-6
- Eight Decades: The Selected Writings of W. Gunther Plaut (2008) ISBN 978-1-55002-861-4

Preceded by Sydney Harris	President of the Canadian Jewish Congress; 1977-1980	Succeeded by Irwin Cotler
