= First Congregational Church (Jackson, Michigan) =

- U.S. National Register of Historic Places
- Michigan State Historic Site
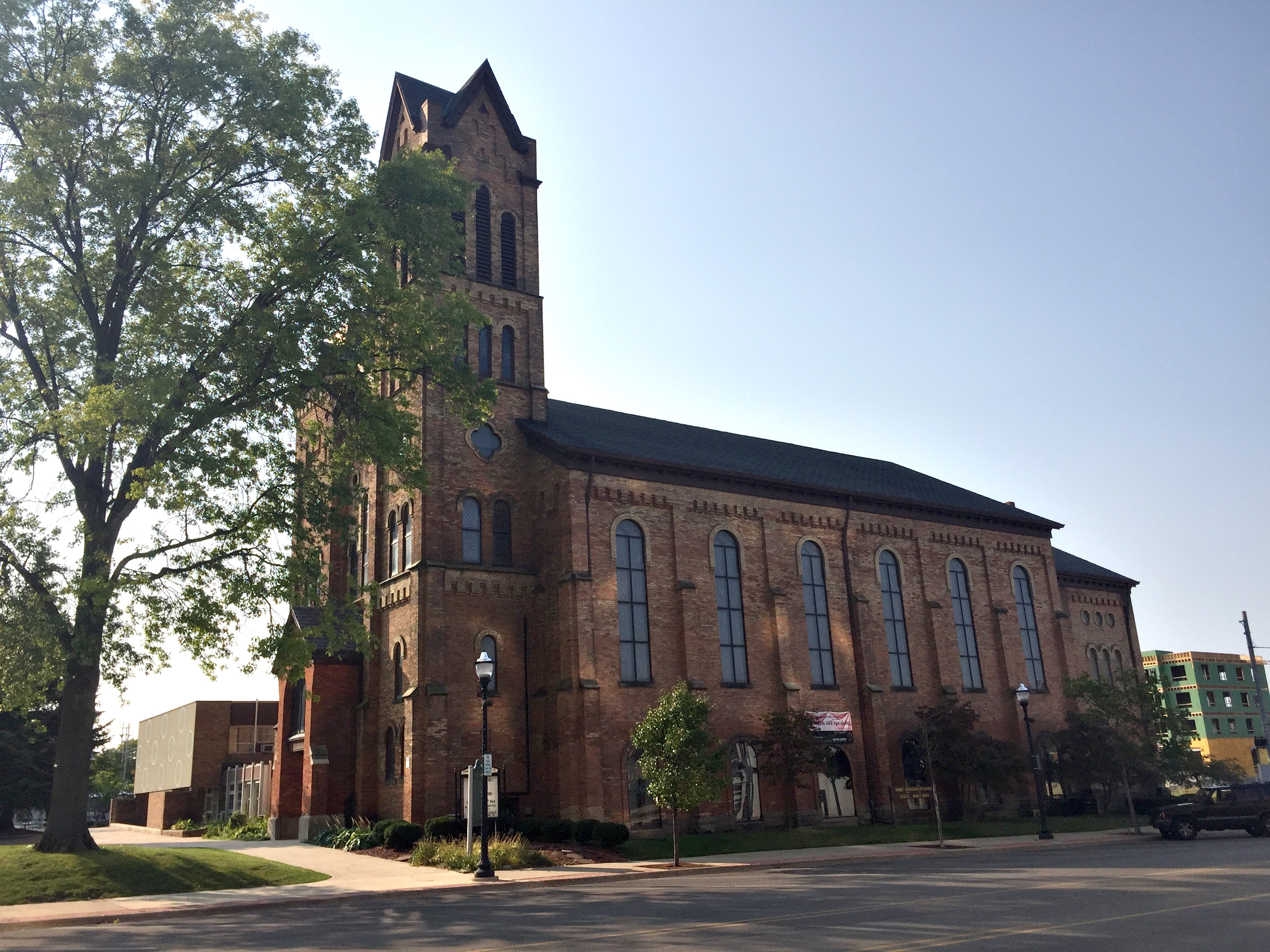
- View from Jackson St.

- Location within Michigan Location within the United States
- Interactive map
- Location: 120 N Jackson St, Jackson, Michigan
- Coordinates: 42°14′54″N 84°24′32″W
- Built: 1859
- Built by: James Morwick
- Architect: Horatio Nelson White
- Architectural style: Romanesque Revival
- NRHP reference No.: 100001294
- Added to NRHP: July 10, 2017

The First Congregational Church is a historic church in downtown Jackson, Michigan, adjacent to the original city square. It was listed as a Michigan State Historic Site in 1987 and added to the National Register of Historic Places in July 2017. The church is currently home to the First Congregational Church, United Church of Christ of Jackson.

== History ==
A Presbyterian Church in Jackson was organized in June 1837, led by the Rev. Marcus Harrison. Harrison and many of the members were originally Congregationalists, but Congregationalists and Presbyterians often formed on unified church in what was then the western frontier. However, in 1841, Harrison and 57 congregants broke off to found a new Congregationalist church, leaving a small number of Presbyterians behind. The congregation began constructing a new building, but ran out of funds, and it was not until 1843 that the new Congregationalist Church construction was complete. However, Jackson was a growing city, and the influx of new residents also added to the Congregationalist church, which had expanded to 222 members by 1850. By 1858, the church was actively involved in planning for a new building.

In 1858, the church purchased two lots on which to construct a new building. The next year, they hired Syracuse architect Horatio Nelson White to design the building and contracted with James Morwick, also of Syracuse, to construct it. Construction of the Congregational Church began in early 1859, and the church was dedicated on October 18, 1860. However, the church congregation continued to grow. By 1871, the Congregationalists needed even more space, particularly for a meeting hall and Sunday school rooms. To gain more space, the entire building was raised eight feet, and a lower section built underneath.

In 1895, a new entryway was added to the church. The original parsonage was removed some time in the late 1940s, and in 1960 a new modern addition was constructed as a Christian Education Wing. As of 2019, the First Congregational Church still uses the building.

== Description ==
The First Congregational Church is a large reddish brown brick Romanesque Revival structure, with a modern two-story brick addition on one side. The original building sits on a stone foundation and is topped with a gabled roof clad with asphalt shingles. The center section of the facade, containing the entryway, projects forward, forming an entryway with a slate covered gable roof. A recessed, round-arch door is within the entryway. The projecting section is flanked by two massive, distinctly different towers. The towers are similar at their bases, but one if taller than the other, extending four sections to the shorter one's two. There are round-headed stained glass windows on either side of the church, which are original to the building.

The modern two-story addition is a brown brick structure accented with burgundy enameled metal panels. It sits on a concrete foundation and has a flat roof.

== Gallery ==
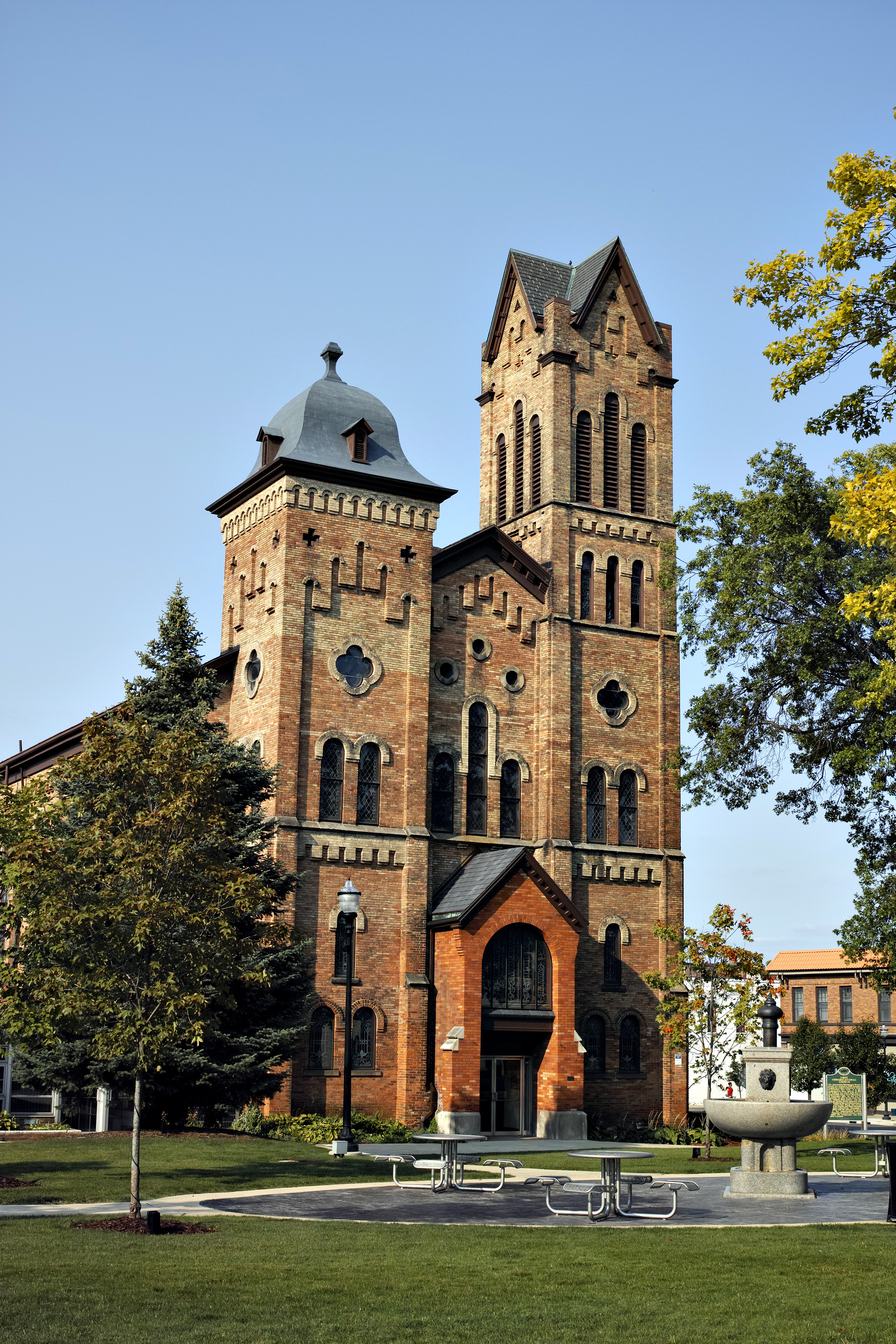
View from W. Michigan Ave.

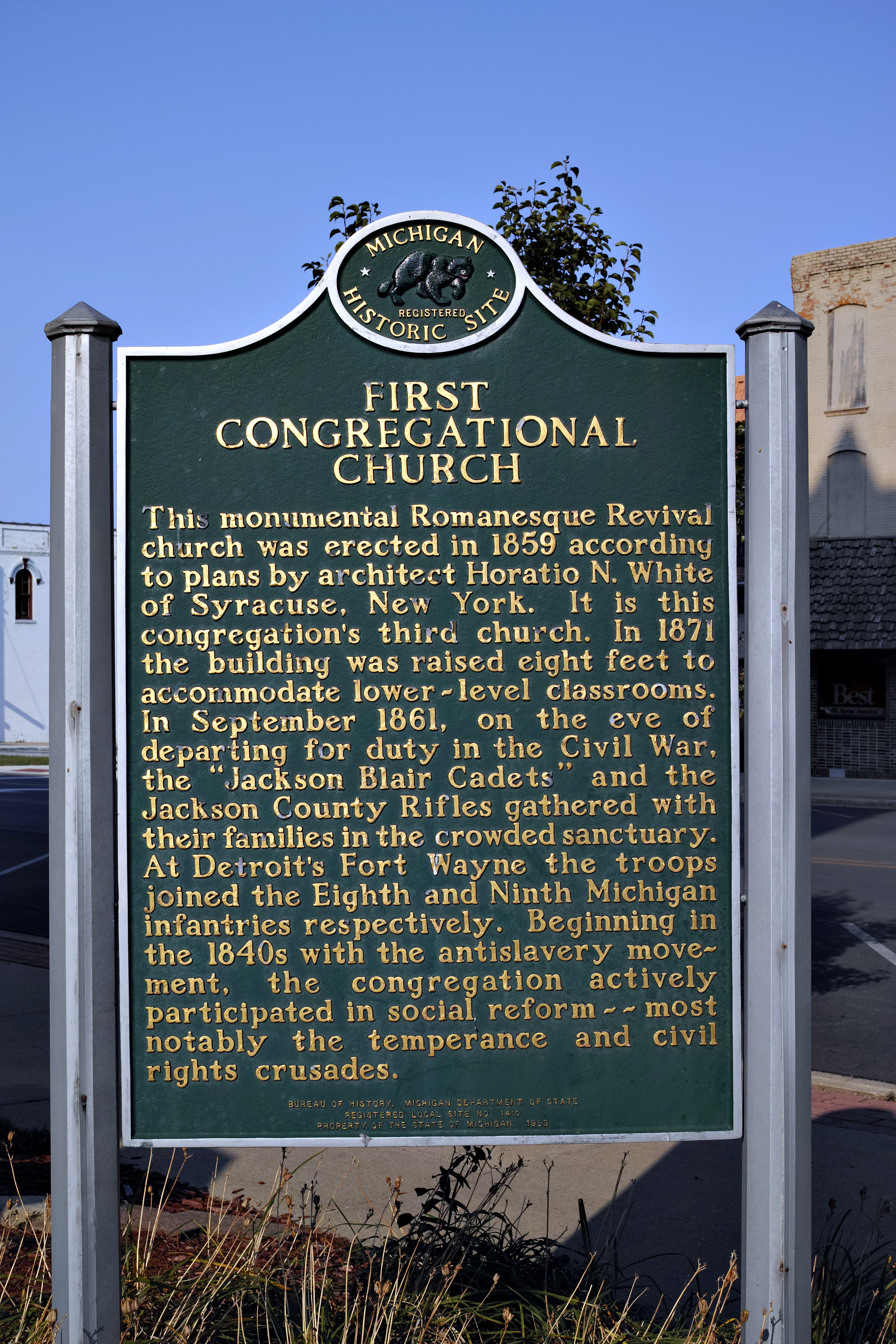
Michigan Historic Site marker

== See also ==
- National Register of Historic Places listings in Jackson County, Michigan
- List of Michigan State Historic Sites in Jackson County, Michigan
