= Mill Street–Raisin River Bridge =

- U.S. National Register of Historic Places
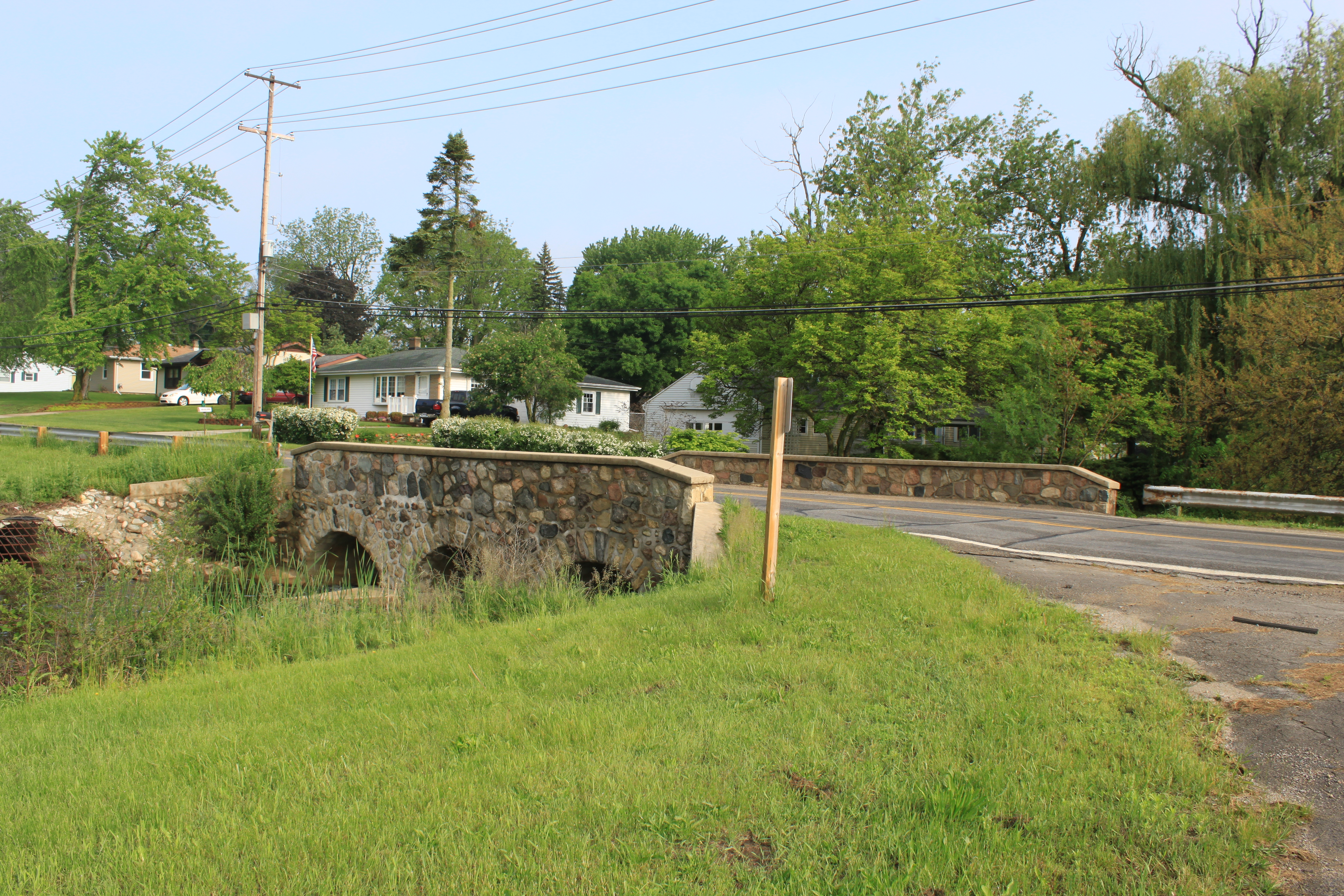
- Interactive map
- Location: Mill Street over River Raisin, Brooklyn, Michigan
- Coordinates: 42°06′36″N 84°14′44″W
- Area: Less than one acre
- Built: 1925
- Architect: Michigan State Highway Department
- Architectural style: Concrete arch
- MPS: Highway Bridges of Michigan MPS
- NRHP reference No.: 99001675
- Added to NRHP: January 14, 2000

The Mill Street–Raisin River Bridge is a bridge carrying Mill Street over the River Raisin in Brooklyn, Michigan, United States. It was listed on the National Register of Historic Places in 2000.

== History ==
In the early 1900s, the bridge at this location was a three-span stone arch structure. In 1921, Henry Ford purchased the nearby Brooklyn water-powered mill as part of his village industries program. This bridge, constructed in 1925, was likely built to accommodate anticipated traffic increases associated with Ford's mill. The stone facing on the bridge likely came from the earlier bridge. The mill site, however, remained vacant for several years until 1937, when it began producing automobile horns, distributors, and starter switches.

== Description ==
The Mill Street bridge is a 35-foot-long (11 m), three-span concrete arch bridge with a 22.4-foot-wide (6.8 m) deck. The maximum span of the arches measures eight feet (2.4 m). The bridge has flared concrete wingwalls covered with a stone veneer. On the upstream side are cutwaters on both piers and at both abutment–wingwall junctions. On the downstream side, a concrete apron slopes down to the riverbed. Solid parapet railings along each side of the bridge are also faced with stone veneer. The riverbanks on both sides of the bridge are lined with mortared stone.
