= Jonathan Plaut =

American writer and rabbi (1942–2012)

Rabbi Dr. Jonathan V. Plaut D.H.L., D.D., LL.D.
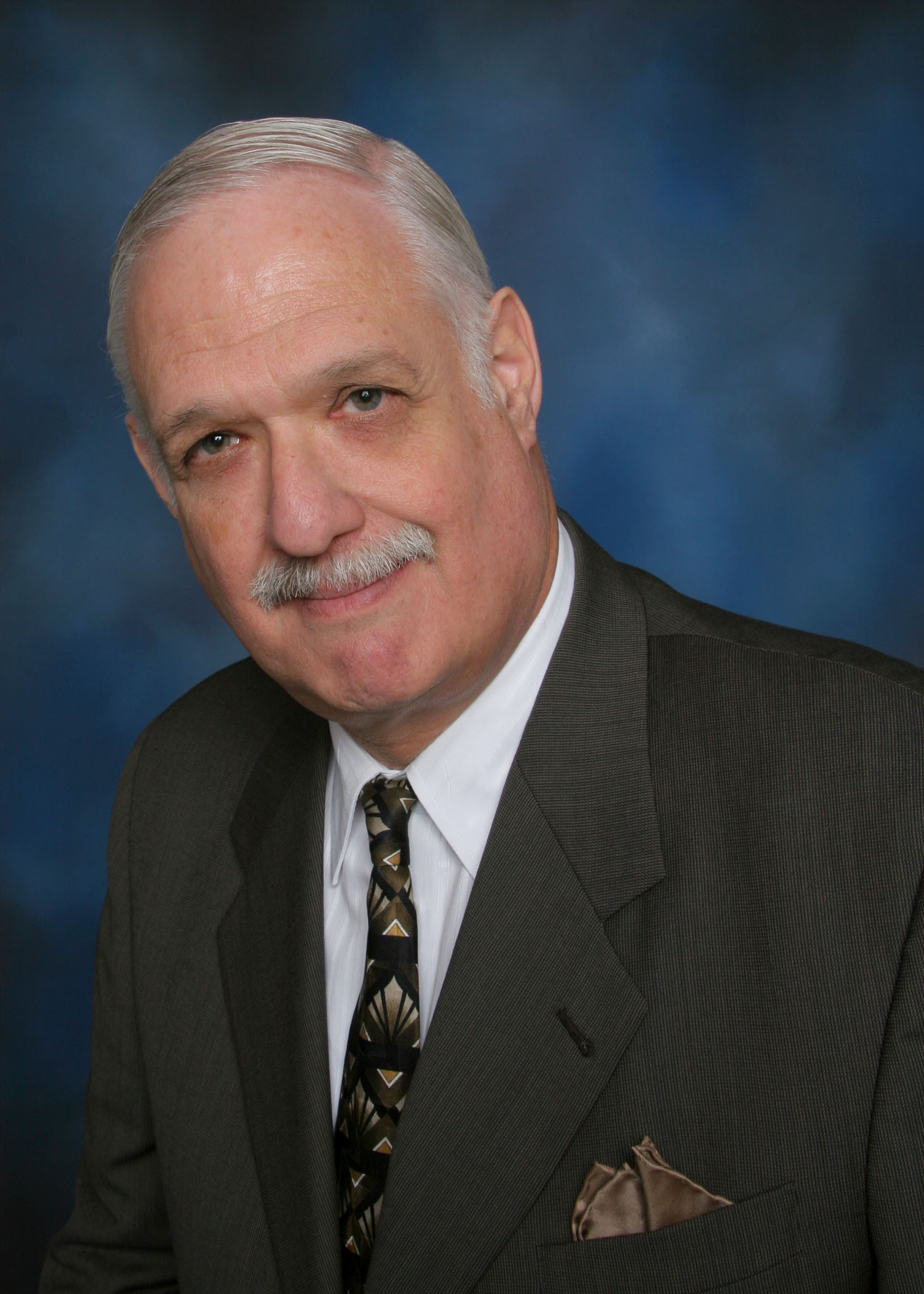

Personal life
- Born: October 7, 1942 Chicago, Illinois
- Died: April 17, 2012 (aged 69) Farmington Hills, Michigan
- Buried: Holy Blossom Memorial Park, Toronto
- Spouse: Carol Plaut
- Children: 2
- Parent(s): Rabbi W. Gunther Plaut and Elizabeth Strauss Plaut

Religious life
- Religion: Judaism
- Denomination: Reform
- Synagogue: Temple Beth Israel
- Position: Rabbi
- Semikhah: Hebrew Union College

Jonathan V. Plaut (October 7, 1942 – April 17, 2012) was an American Reform rabbi and author. Plaut was the rabbi of Temple Beth Israel in Jackson, MI.

== Biography ==
He was born in Chicago, the son of Rabbi Dr. W. Gunther Plaut, an internationally renowned Jewish scholar who lived in Toronto, Ontario until his death on February 8, 2012 at the age of 99.

On October 1, 2000, Jonathan Plaut was appointed spiritual leader of Temple Beth Israel (Jackson, Michigan). Prior to this, he served as Senior Rabbi of Temple Emanu-El, San Jose, California from 1985 to 1993 and Congregation Beth El in Windsor, Ontario, Canada from 1970 to 1984 where he spearheaded the synagogue’s growth of more than a hundred percent. In addition, he held part-time positions at Temple Beth El (Bloomfield Hills, Michigan) as Visiting Rabbinic Scholar and for five years at Congregation Beth El in Traverse City, Michigan before becoming Rabbi Emeritus in August 2004.

A 1964 graduate of Macalester College in St. Paul, Minnesota, he was ordained in 1970 from the Hebrew Union College, Cincinnati, Ohio. Plaut earned a Doctor of Hebrew Letters degree in 1977 and an honorary Doctor of Divinity degree in 1995 from the Hebrew Union College. In 2009, he received a Doctor of Laws Degree (honoris causa) from Assumption University which is in federation with the University of Windsor. For eight years, Plaut was adjunct assistant professor in the Religious Studies Department at Santa Clara University, San Jose, California. From 2001 to 2008, he taught a one semester graduate course at University of Detroit Mercy. In Windsor, Ontario, he taught for twelve years at Assumption College School. For more than a decade, he hosted a weekly religious news program on CBET-TV television and CKWW radio in Windsor.

He was the editor of the Journal of the Canadian Jewish Historical Society from 1977 to 1984, and Through the Sound of Many Voices: Writings Contributed on the Occasion of the 70th Birthday of W. Gunther Plaut. For nearly nine years, he wrote a monthly article for the San Jose Jewish Community News. In 2007, he authored The Jews of Windsor 1790–1990: A Historical Chronicle. In 2007, he also edited One Voice: The Selected Sermons of W. Gunther Plaut and The Plaut Family: Tracing the Legacy and in 2008 wrote the introduction for Eight Decades: The Selected Writings of W. Gunther Plaut.

All of Rabbi Plaut's papers spanning a career of nearly 40 years are housed at Library and Archives Canada in Ottawa, Ontario, Canada. Included in this collection are the research materials, newspaper articles, interviews and photographs of the Windsor Jewish Community from 1790 to 2000.

Rabbi Plaut held many civic and religious posts and was the youngest person to receive Windsor Jewry's highest communal honor in 1985, becoming the Jewish National Fund Negev Dinner honoree. Active in a variety of communal activities, Rabbi Plaut headed the Jewish National Fund, United Jewish Appeal of Windsor, State of Israel Bonds, Credit Counseling Service of Metropolitan Windsor, Counsel of Agency Executives and Rabbis in San Jose, and was chaplain for both the San Jose Fire and Police departments.

Rabbi Plaut and his wife, Carol, had two children: a son, Daniel Plaut, and a daughter, Mrs. Deborah Elias.

== Selected works ==
Authored:

- The Jews of Windsor, 1790–1990: A Historical Chronicle (2007), ISBN 978-1-55002-706-8

Edited:

- Through the sound of many voices : writings contributed on the occasion of the 70th birthday of W. Gunther Plaut (1982), ISBN 0-88619-030-4
- One Voice: The Selected Sermons of W. Gunther Plaut (2007), ISBN 978-1-55002-739-6
- Journal of the Canadian Jewish Historical Society Journal of the Canadian Jewish Historical Society
- The Plaut Family: Tracing the Legacy (2007), ISBN 978-1-886223-34-9
- Eight Decades (2008), ISBN 978-1-55002-861-4
- Eileen McCullough (1982), ISBN 978-0-88924-125-1
- One Voice (2007), ISBN 978-1-55002-739-6

Introduction/Preface:

- On Sunday Observance 1906, Compiled by David Rome with Preface Jonathan V. Plaut, (Montreal: National Archives, Canadian Jewish Congress, 1979)
- On the Early Harts, Compiled by David Rome with Preface Jonathan V. Plaut (Montreal: National Archives, Canadian Jewish Congress, 1980)
- On the Early Harts—Their Contemporaries, Compiled by David Rome with Preface Jonathan V. Plaut, (Montreal: National Archives, Canadian Jewish Congress, 1981–1982)
- Introduction, Plaut, W. Gunther, Eight Decades: The Selected Writings of W. Gunther Plaut (Dundurn Press, 2008)
