= Temple Beth Israel (Jackson, Michigan) =

Reform synagogue in Jackson, Michigan, United States

Beth Israel
- Hebrew: בית ישראל
- Location in Michigan

Religion
- Affiliation: Reform Judaism
- Ecclesiastical or organizational status: Synagogue
- Leadership: Rabbi S. Robert Morais
- Status: Active

Location
- Location: 801 West Michigan Avenue, Jackson, Michigan
- Country: United States
- Interactive map of Beth Israel
- Coordinates: 42°14′51″N 84°25′25″W

Architecture
- Type: Synagogue
- Established: 1862 (as a congregation)
- Completed: 1949

Website
- tbijackson.org

Temple Beth Israel (Hebrew: בית ישראל) is a Reform Jewish synagogue located at 801 West Michigan Avenue in Jackson, Michigan, in the United States. Formed in 1862 by Jews of German background, it grew out of the Hebrew Benevolent Society, which had been organized in 1858, and was the second Reform congregation in Michigan.

After meeting in downtown Jackson in two different buildings, the congregation moved to its current site, on Michigan Avenue, that was dedicated in 1949 and remodelled following a fire in 1971. The congregation's cemetery is the oldest Jewish cemetery in continuous use and was listed on the National Register of Historic Places in June 2009.

Jonathan V. Plaut, the son of the notable rabbi W. Gunther Plaut, was rabbi from 2000 until his death in 2012. In September 2011 S. Robert Morais became Beth Israel's rabbi.
