= Gordon Hitt Farmstead =

- U.S. National Register of Historic Places
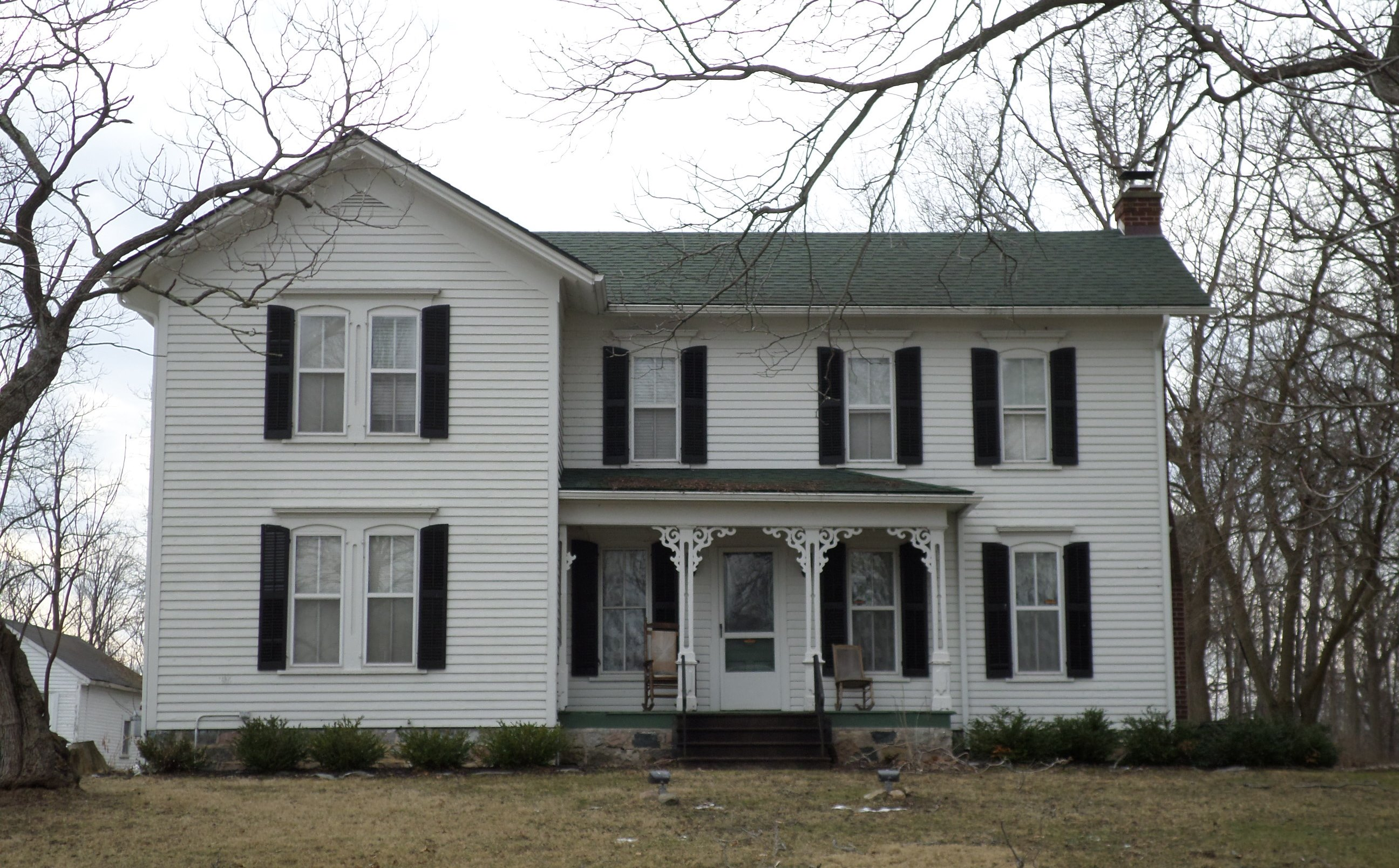
- 1868 main house

- Location within Michigan Location within the United States
- Interactive map
- Location: 4561 N. Lake Rd., Clark Lake, Michigan
- Coordinates: 42°07′25″N 84°18′13″W
- Area: 55 acres (22 ha)
- Built: 1868
- Architectural style: Italianate, Gambrel-roof barns
- NRHP reference No.: 94000743
- Added to NRHP: July 22, 1994

The Gordon Hitt Farmstead is a farm located at 4561 North Lake Road near Clark Lake, Michigan, United States. It was listed on the National Register of Historic Places in 1994.

== History ==
The first European settlers arrived in the Clark Lake area in 1833. In 1835, Ephraim, a veteran of the War of 1812, and Nellie Hitt, along with their eight children including their young son Gordon, moved from Delaware County, New York to this area in the wilderness of Michigan, then a part of the Northwest Territory. They traveled by way of horse and wagon from New York to Michigan via Canada. Although they were originally headed toward White Pigeon, Michigan, Ephraim decided to settle at Clark Lake. They built a log cabin near the shore of Clark Lake.

In the 1850s, the Federal government granted Ephraim two bounty land warrants totalling 160 acres for his service in the War of 1812. The family then built a new home further north away from the lake along North Lake Road. That home was destroyed by a fire in the 1860s. By this time Gordon was grown, and in 1868 he constructed a new farmhouse near the site of the older building. Around the same time, a group of barns was constructed across the road from the house. Over the next three decades, the Hitt farm expanded from 160 acres to 270 acres. By the 1890s, Gordon Hitt had died, and his son Elmer built a second house near the main one for his mother (and Gordon's widow) Eliza Hitt. He constructed a small garage in 1912. By this time, Clark Lake was becoming a recreation hub, and in the 1920s, Elmer and his son Gordon sold off lots along the lakeshore for cottages. Into the twentieth century, the usage of the Hitt farmstead changed. The farm decreased in size, and in the 1930s, Gordon Hitt operated a boys' summer camp on the site.

The farm eventually passed to Gordon's son, Richard. Richard operated it as a bed and breakfast for a time. He died in 2008. The farm passed to younger member of the Hitt family.

== Description ==
The Hitt Farmstead includes a complex of buildings on either side of North Lake Road. On one side are the two-story main house, a smaller 1 1/2-story secondary house, a garage and small shed. On the other side are two large gambrel roof barns, the foundation of a third barn, and a one-story gable roof outbuilding.

The main house is a two-story, Upright and Wing balloon frame house with intersecting gable roofs covered with asphalt shingles. It sits on a fieldstone foundation, and is covered with clapboards and vertical corner boards. A single-story gabled dining room and kitchen ell extends from the rear of the house. The upright portion is one bay wide, and side-gabled wing portion is three bays wide, fronted by a single-story porch running for two bays. The front entrance is located near the junction of the upright and wing. Two more porches are located in the rear. All porches have hipped roofs and are decorated with cut-outs, paneled bases and floral brackets. The windows throughout the house are tall, two-over-two double-hung sash units in slightly arched openings flanked by shutters with their tops cut to match the arches of the windows.

The secondary house is a 1 1/2-story, front-gabled balloon framed structure covered with horizontal clapboard siding with flat corner boards. A small single-story side-gabled kitchen ell is located to one side of the main section. A hipped roof, single-story porch wraps around the house from the ell across the front and onto the other side. The porch has a plain geometric railing. The windows are one-over-one double-hung units, paired on the gable ends.

Two smaller buildings are located nearby on the same side of the road: a small wooden single-story gable roof garage, and a small gabled chicken coop/storage shed. Across the road are two barns and another outbuilding. The outbuilding is a single-story, gable roof post and beam structure on a limestone foundation. It is covered with horizontal siding with flat corner boards, and has a pair of side-hinged vertical plank doors. The two barns are joined, gambrel structures sited nearby, with their roof ridgelines perpendicular to each other. The barns sit on limestone foundations. The lower levels of the barns are covered with vertical board and batten siding, with horizontal drop siding identical to that on the outbuilding on the upper section of one, and newer board and batten siding on the upper level of the other. The roofs of all three buildings are covered with asphalt shingles.

== Gallery ==
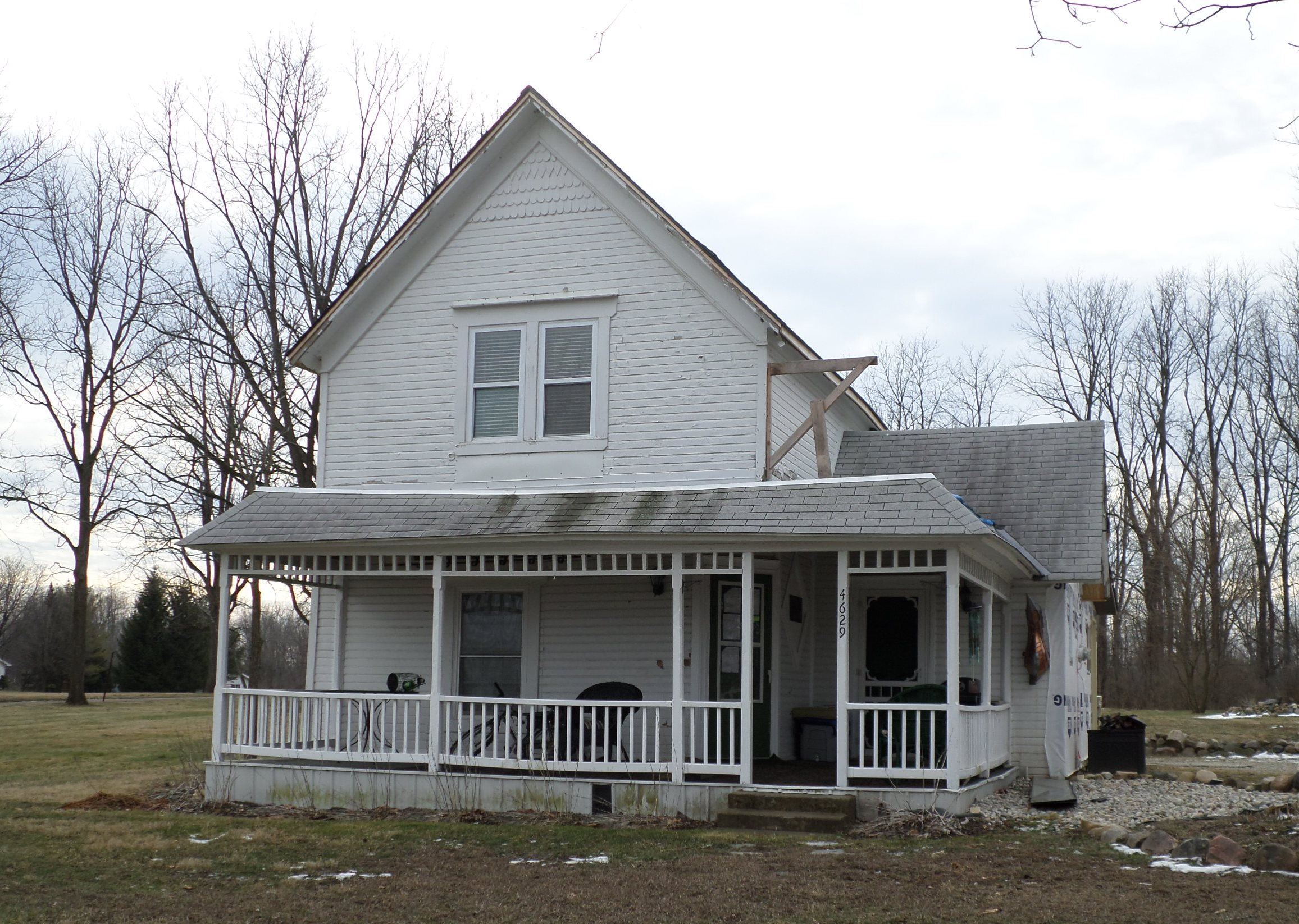
Secondary house

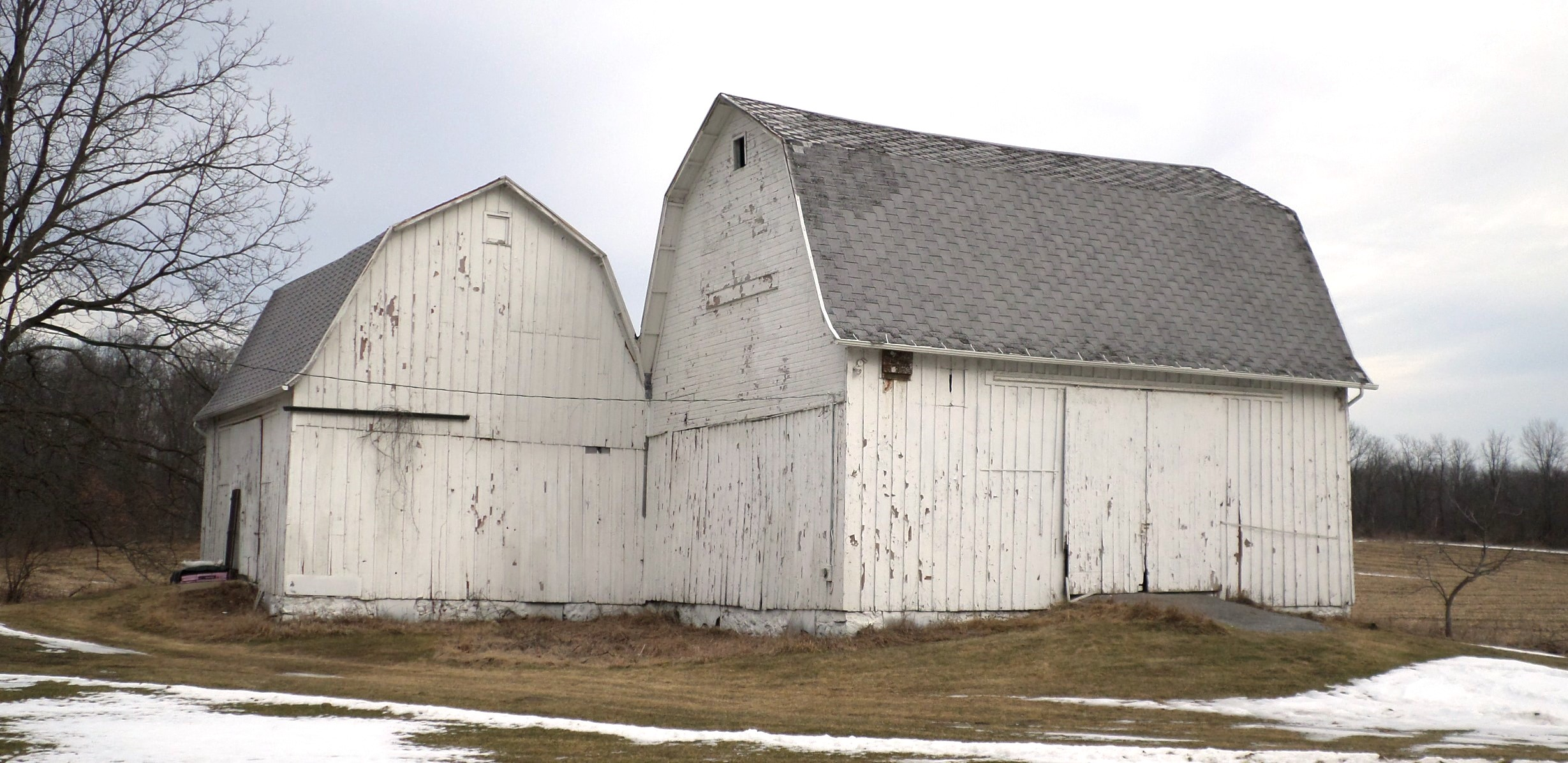
Barns
