= Frederick A., Jr. and Caroline Hewett Kennedy Farm =

- U.S. National Register of Historic Places
- Interactive map
- Location: 8490 Hanover Rd., Hanover, Michigan
- Coordinates: 42°6′5″N 84°33′56″W
- Area: 80 acres (32 ha)
- Built: c. 1847
- Architectural style: Greek Revival, Basement barn
- NRHP reference No.: 00000643
- Added to NRHP: December 21, 2000

The Frederick A., Jr. and Caroline Hewett Kennedy Farm is a historic farmstead located at 8490 Hanover Road near Hanover, Michigan. It was listed on the National Register of Historic Places in 2000.

== History ==
Frederick A. Kennedy, Jr. was born in 1811 in Brighton, England, and emigrated to the United States in 1817 along with his family. The family moved around New York State and Pennsylvania, eventually settling near Lodi, New York in 1821. In about 1830 or 1831, Frederick Jr. moved to Tecumseh, Michigan, where he married Caroline Hewett. The Kennedys moved to Hanover Township, Michigan in 1837, part of the early wave of European settlers who arrived in the area. The couple purchased property, eventually amassing 370 acres. After arriving, the Kennedys constructed a small house located just east of the present site.

The construction date of the present house is unknown, although tax records suggest that a portion of it was built in the 1846-47 period, and a larger portion added in the 1855-56 period. Frederick A. Kennedy, Jr., served four terms as Hanover Township supervisor, and in 1846 was elected to the state legislature. However, in 1871 the Kennedys moved to Jackson, and in 1883 they sold the Hanover farm to their son, Van Buren Kennedy and his wife Adelia M. Kennedy. In 1936, the property was purchased by Hiram A. and Helen Tallmadge; Helen Tallmadge sold it to Dr. and Mrs. John Hand in 1980.

== Description ==
The Frederick A. and Caroline Hewett Kennedy, Jr., Farm is an eighty-acre farm, containing open field and pasture as well as wooded sections. On the property are a brick, Upright and Wing-style Greek Revival house and a timber-frame basement barn.

The house consists of a two-story upright section and one-story wing with a single-story ell in the rear. The house sits on a fieldstone foundation, and the walls are made of hard-baked brick in the front, upright-and-wing section of softer brick in the rear ell, perhaps indicating different construction dates. The windows are six-over-six units in square-head openings with splayed brickwork caps The wing is fronted with a recessed porch containing the front entrance; the porch is supported by two fluted Tuscan columns with similar half-columns flanking the opening. Frieze windows under the eaves of the upright contain decorative cast-iron grilles.

The nineteenth-century gable-roof barn is located well to the rear of the house. It is constructed of rubble fieldstone walls on two sides and vertical boarding on the other two. A superstructure is completely clad in vertical board-and-batten siding. One side of the basement contains an entrance.
