= Hayes Hotel =

- U.S. National Register of Historic Places
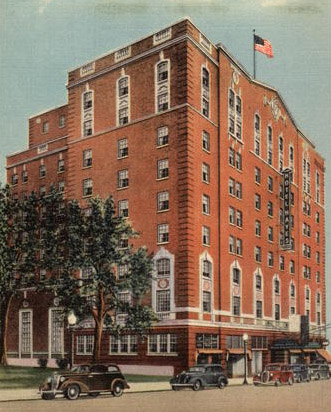
- Hayes Hotel, c. 1940 from a postcard

- Location within Michigan
- Interactive map
- Location: 226-234 West Michigan Ave., Jackson, Michigan
- Coordinates: 42°14′52″N 84°24′37″W
- Built: 1926
- Architect: Holabird & Roche
- Architectural style: Neo-Classical Revival
- NRHP reference No.: 100010157
- Added to NRHP: March 19, 2024

The Hayes Hotel is a former hotel located at 226-234 West Michigan Avenue in Jackson, Michigan. It was listed on the National Register of Historic Places in 2024.

== History ==
In 1924, leading citizens of Jackson formed the Jackson Community Hotel Company in order to fund the construction of a new hotel. The site along Michigan Avenue was chosen based on its proximity to the Michigan Central Railroad. Once funding was secured, the company hired the Chicago architectural firm of Holabird & Roche to design the new hotel. The hotel opened in November 1926 with over 200 rooms, a ballroom, dining hall, dancing hall, various conference rooms, and retail storefronts on the ground level.

In 1951, the Hayes Hotel was purchased by the conglomerate International Hotels, Inc., which refurbished the guest rooms. In 1964 the hotel was purchased by the Civic Center Hotel Corporation, a local Jackson business organization. Renovations were completed in 1967; however, the hotel was not profitable, and in 1973 it was sold to Consumers Energy. Consumers used the top floors for office space and leased the lower floors back to the Civic Center Hotel Corporation. Despite the sale, the hotel was unable to turn a profit, and hotel operations ceased in 1975.

Consumers remained the primary occupant in the 1980s and 1990s, and in 2000 the building was purchased by the city of Jackson. The building has been vacant until 2024. The city expected to sell the building to developers J. Jeffers & Co. in early 2024. The plan is for the building to be redeveloped into 84 apartment along with event space and retail areas.

== Description ==
The Hayes Hotel is a ten-story red brick Neo-Classical Revival building, with terra cotta and cast stone ornamentation. The building has a flat roof. Small one-story additions dating from the 1960s are attached to the rear.

The main elevation is seven bays wide, with a base consisting of the first and second stories, a main section consisting of stories three through eight, and a top section of the ninth and tenth stories. The lower section is made of red brick with a granite water table. A recessed entrance to the hotel is centrally located, with storefronts containing separate entrances to each side. Above this is a main section built of smooth red brick with brick quoins located at each end. The third- and fourth-story windows in this section are surrounded with terra cotta ornamentation. A thin terra cotta band above the eighth floor separates the main section from the top. Windows on the ninth and tenth floors are also surrounded with terra cotta ornamentation, and a gable is centrally located above.
