= Hugh H. Richard House =

- U.S. National Register of Historic Places
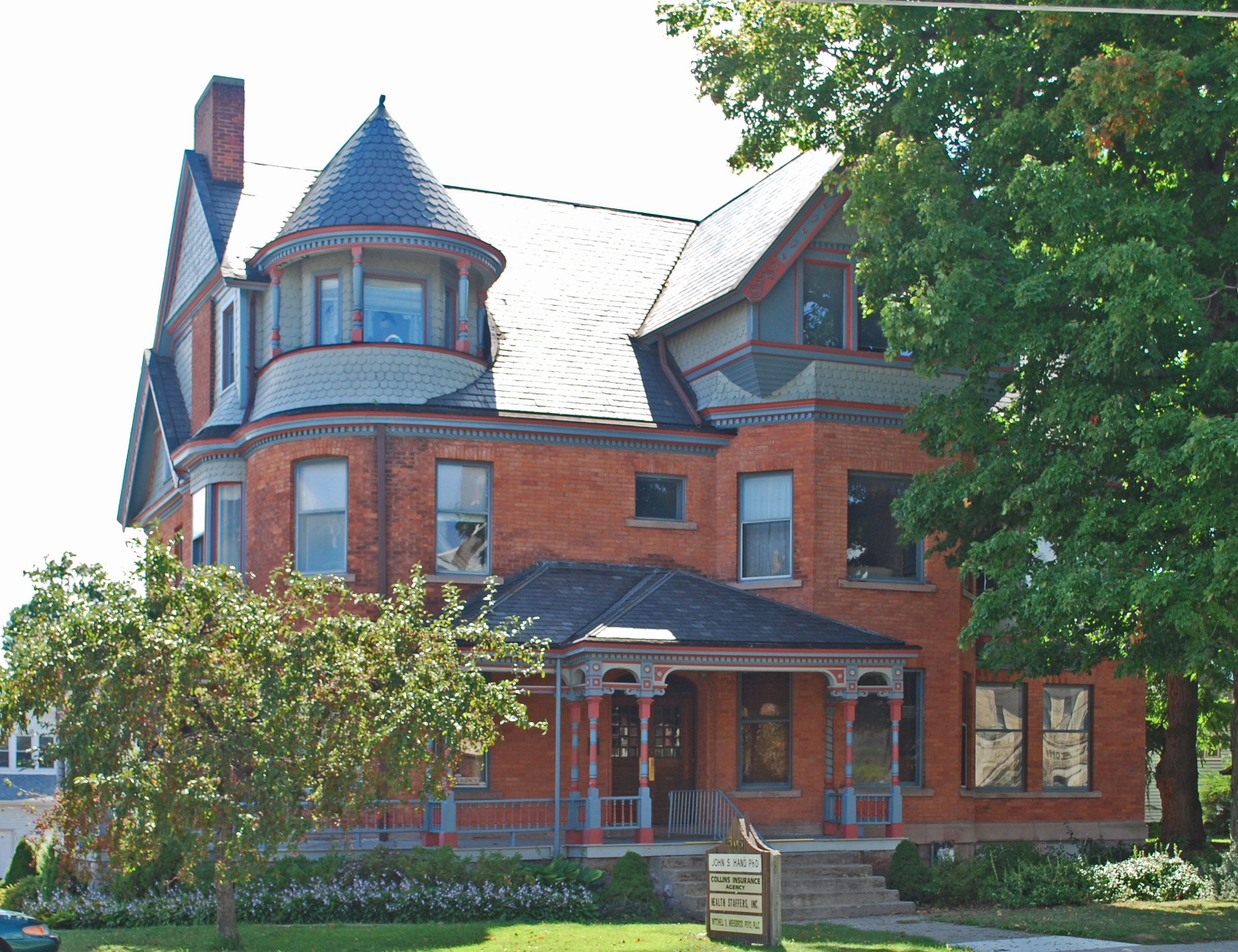

- Location within Michigan
- Interactive map
- Location: 505 Wildwood Ave., Jackson, Michigan
- Coordinates: 42°14′53″N 84°25′01″W
- Area: less than one acre
- Built: 1888
- Architectural style: Queen Anne
- NRHP reference No.: 93001352
- Added to NRHP: December 2, 1993

The Hugh H. Richard House, also known as the Hand Building, or Fossores Chapter House, located at 505 Wildwood Avenue in Jackson, Michigan, United States, was built as a single-family home, and later converted to office use. It was listed on the National Register of Historic Places in 1993.

== History ==
Hugh H. Richard was born in 1824 in County Antrim, Ireland. In 1828, his family emigrated to the United States and settled in Geneseo, New York. In 1833, they moved again to Lenawee County, Michigan, settling near Tecumseh. By 1850, Hugh Richard was making his living as a mason. In about 1869 he moved to Jackson and continued working as a mason until he retired in the late 1880s. In about 1888, he constructed a brick home for his own use. He lived there until his death in 1893.

After Richard's death, the house passed on to his daughter Alice and her husband Arthur A. Bennett. Arthur A. Bennett was at the time secretary and treasurer of the Bennett Sewer Pipe Company, and later became the general manager. Bennett died in 1930, and since that time it appears that the house has been used as office space for professionals. In the 1970s the entire house was converted to office space.

In 2018 the house was purchased by Dr. David McDonald, lead pastor at Westwinds Church. The space was officially rebranded as the Fossores Chapter House, and is marketed as "a research and development center for creative pastors."

== Description ==
The Richard House is a 2-1/2-story, brick, gable-roof, Queen Anne house with a rectangular side-gable front section and gable-roof rear ell. It sits on a masonry foundation, and additional stone trims the brick of the main section. The front facade has a slightly off-center, projecting structure containing slant-sided bay windows on the first and second stories with a gabled third story section cantilevered on top. The corner has a rounded, hip-roof dormer shaped like a turret. A hip-roof, turned-column front porch extends across the facade between the rounded turret corner and the bay window. The porch is detailed with bracketry. The bable fronts are extensively detailed.
