= Commercial Exchange Building (Jackson, Michigan) =

- Collins Manufacturing – Jackson Automobile Company complex
- U.S. National Register of Historic Places
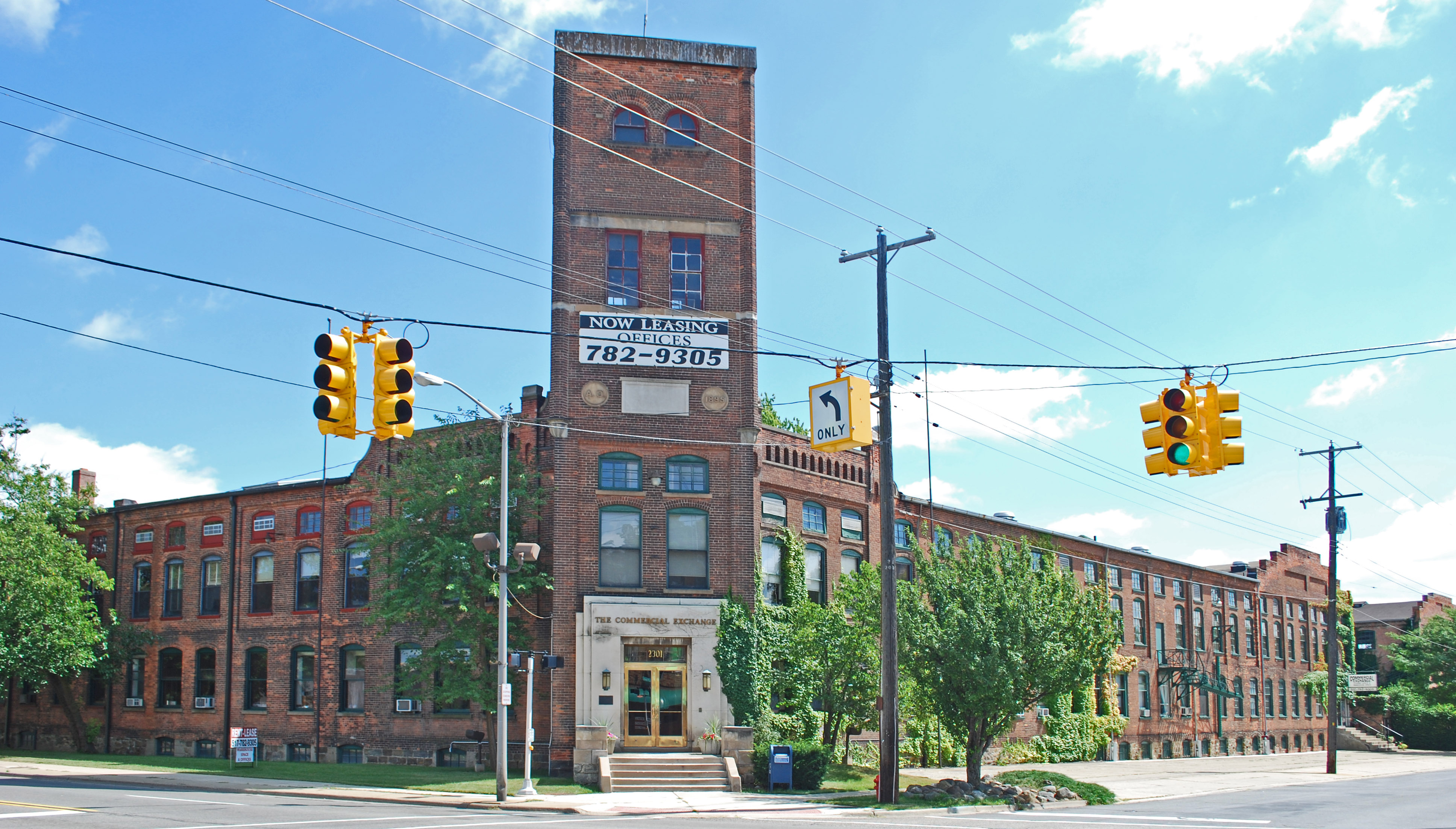

- Location within Michigan
- Interactive map
- Location: 2301 E. Michigan Ave., Jackson, Michigan
- Coordinates: 42°15′09″N 84°22′32″W
- Area: 3 acres (1.2 ha)
- Built: 1895
- NRHP reference No.: 93000622
- Added to NRHP: July 9, 1993

The Commercial Exchange Building, also known as the Collins Manufacturing – Jackson Automobile Company complex, is an industrial building complex located at 2301 E. Michigan Ave. in Jackson, Michigan. The building was built partly in 1895, and was listed on the National Register of Historic Places in 1993. The listing included four contributing buildings.

== History ==
In 1885, prominent businessmen Samuel B. Collins and Dwight and Henry Smith established the Collins Manufacturing Company to manufacture wagons, carts, surreys, sleighs and buggies. The owners looked for a place to build a factory, and decided on this area, then near the eastern edge of Jackson. Around 1880, the Michigan Central Railroad had constructed a spur in this area, which prompted the construction of a number of nearby industrial buildings. Collins Manufacturing constructed an 1885 factory at this site and began manufacturing. A decade later, the company employed 300–400 men and was producing 20,000 vehicles per year. However, in 1895, a fire destroyed the factory. Collins Manufacturing immediately rebuilt the same year, constructing a massive U-shaped factory on the site.

A few years later, in 1897, the Collins Manufacturing Company was absorbed by another Jackson business, the National Wheel Company. National Wheel relocated its general offices into the former Collins Manufacturing site, occupying it until 1908. In 1908, the former Collins factory was purchased by the Jackson Automobile Company, which built cars there. Around this time, a second building was constructed, enclosing the U of the original building. In 1909, Jackson Automobile built another two buildings on the site. The company used the factory until its dissolution in 1922. The site was then used by Cardon-Phonocraft Corporation, who made neon signs, radio tubes and radio/phonograph receivers. In 1930, Cardon-Phonocraft was purchased by the Sparks-Withington Company (later Sparton Corporation), a Jackson-area manufacturer of auto parts and radios. Sparks-Withington occupied the building until the late-1950s.

In 1961, the manufacturing complex was purchased by a new owner, who renamed the building the "Commercial Exchange Building." Building space is leased to a variety of tenants, who use the space for commercial and manufacturing purposes, as well as warehouse, office, and residential space.

== Description ==
The Collins Manufacturing-Jackson Automobile Company complex consists of four adjacent buildings, distributed over most of sixteen lots. The buildings are brick, set back from the street and former railroad spur by about twenty feet.

Building A (1895) was the first building constructed in the site. It is a three-story, U-shaped red brick building with a six-story tower at the street corner that contains the main entry. The sections have shallow-pitched gable roofs. The U shape is composed of sections that run parallel to East Michigan Avenue and Horton Street, with a third perpendicular to Horton. The East Michigan section is 224 feet (27 bays) long, the Horton Street section is 207 feet (26 bays) long, and the last section is 227 feet long. The basement, first and second stories contain double-hung, 1/1 and 6/9 sash window units. The top floor contains fixed nine-pane sash window units. All windows are in segmentally arched enclosures.

The tower in the corner is angled to face the street intersection. The entryway was remodeled in 1930, and reflects an Art Deco design. It contains double brass doors with a fixed glass transom above, flanked by limestone panels.

Building B (c. 1908) is along the former rail spur, creating a fourth side to the U shape of building A and forming an inner courtyard. This building is also a three-story brick structure with a shallow pitched gable roof. It measures 155 feet long (19 bays) on the exterior and 139 feet long (15 bays) along the interior courtyard. Covered ramps lead into the courtyard from Buildings A and B. There are no basement windows, but the first and second stories contain double-hung, 6/9 sash windows, while the third floor contains double-hung 6/6 sash windows.

Building C (1909) is located to the south of Building A, and is connected to it through a single-story power house/and loading dock. It is also a three-story brick structure. It is a three-story building, measuring approximately 227 feet (23 bays) long and 65 feet (six bays) along the gable ends. The windows are segmentally arched and contain predominantly 8/12 windows on the first and second floors and 8/8 windows on the third floor.

Building D (1909) is also located south of Building C. It is a single-story brick building measuring approximately 60 feet (six bays) by 100 feet (ten bays). It has a slightly-pitched gable roof with a monitor roof running for about 40 feet along the center. All of the window openings are segmentally arched and contain 8/12 sash windows with stone lug sills.

The building complex is surrounded by minimal landscaping. Paved parking and service areas run along Horton Street and between the Buildings. A low cement retaining wall borders the parking area.
