= Peoples National Bank Building (Jackson, Michigan) =

- U.S. National Register of Historic Places
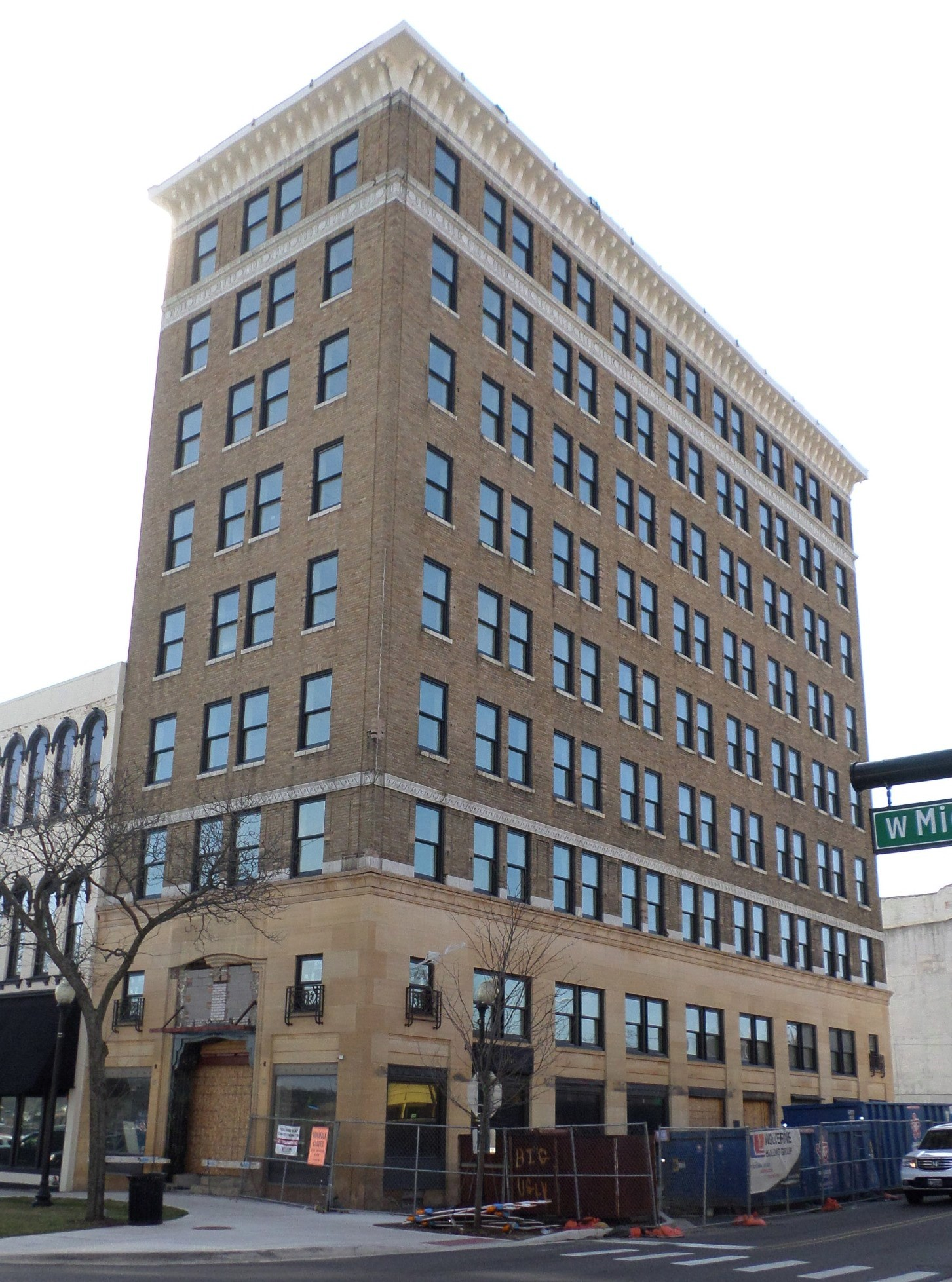

- Location within Michigan
- Interactive map
- Location: 101 E. Michigan Ave., Jackson, Michigan
- Coordinates: 42°14′50″N 84°24′21″W
- Built: 1916
- Built by: Hoggson Brothers
- Architects: Rocker and Vatet
- Architectural style: Neoclassical
- NRHP reference No.: 14000977
- Added to NRHP: December 2, 2014

The Peoples National Bank Building, also known as the Elaine Apartments, is a former office building located at 101 E. Michigan Ave. in Jackson, Michigan. The building was listed on the National Register of Historic Places in 2014.

== History ==
The Peoples National Bank was organized in 1865, and was at the time the only national bank in Jackson. It was originally housed in a four-story mansard roof building, located at the same location as the present bank building. In 1916, the bank decided to construct a new building, demolishing the old one. The bank hired the Hoggson Brothers firm, of New York City and Chicago, to design, build, equip the building. The New York City firm of Rocker & Vatet were the architects. The new building opened in 1917.

In 1929, Peoples National Bank merged with the National Union Bank to become the Union & Peoples National Bank. The new bank vacated the building, opting to construct a new headquarters. The new eventually became part of the then newly established Guardian Detroit Union Group, Inc; this entity suffered substantial losses during the Great Depression, was declared insolvent and closed in 1933, and never re-opened.

The vacated banking space in the People's National Building was filled in 1931 when the Elaine Shop, a women's wear store, moved from their original location at 144 East Michigan Avenue after substantially remodeling the space. The Elaine Shop was very successful, and expanded to the second floor in 1943, and the entire building in 1946. However, sales declined by the late 1960s, and it went out of businessin 1971. IN 1972, the building was converted into apartments, known as the Elaine Apartments.

== Description ==
The Peoples National Bank Building is a narrow, nine-story Neoclassical commercial and office building. It has a two-story based clad with golden cream colored Mankato stone, above which is a gray brick upper portion with terra cotta trim. It is located at the corner of Michigan and Mechanic, and runs for three bays along Michigan and nine along Mechanic. An entablature with cornice runs above the eighth floor, and a broadly projecting metal cornice runs along the front and side roofline.

The first and second story base section reflects the 1931 Art Deco refurbishment of the building. In contains a two-story tall central entrance on the Michigan Avenue side, framed with an Art Deco stylized architrave. This is flanked by large storefront windows with brass trim on the first floor, and small casement windows on the second. Above this is a single window opening on each floor on the two outer bays, and a double opening on the inner bay. Bays on the Mechanic Street side contain windows similar to those on the Michigan Avenue side.
