= Clark Lake Community Center =

- Kentucky Homestead
- U.S. National Register of Historic Places
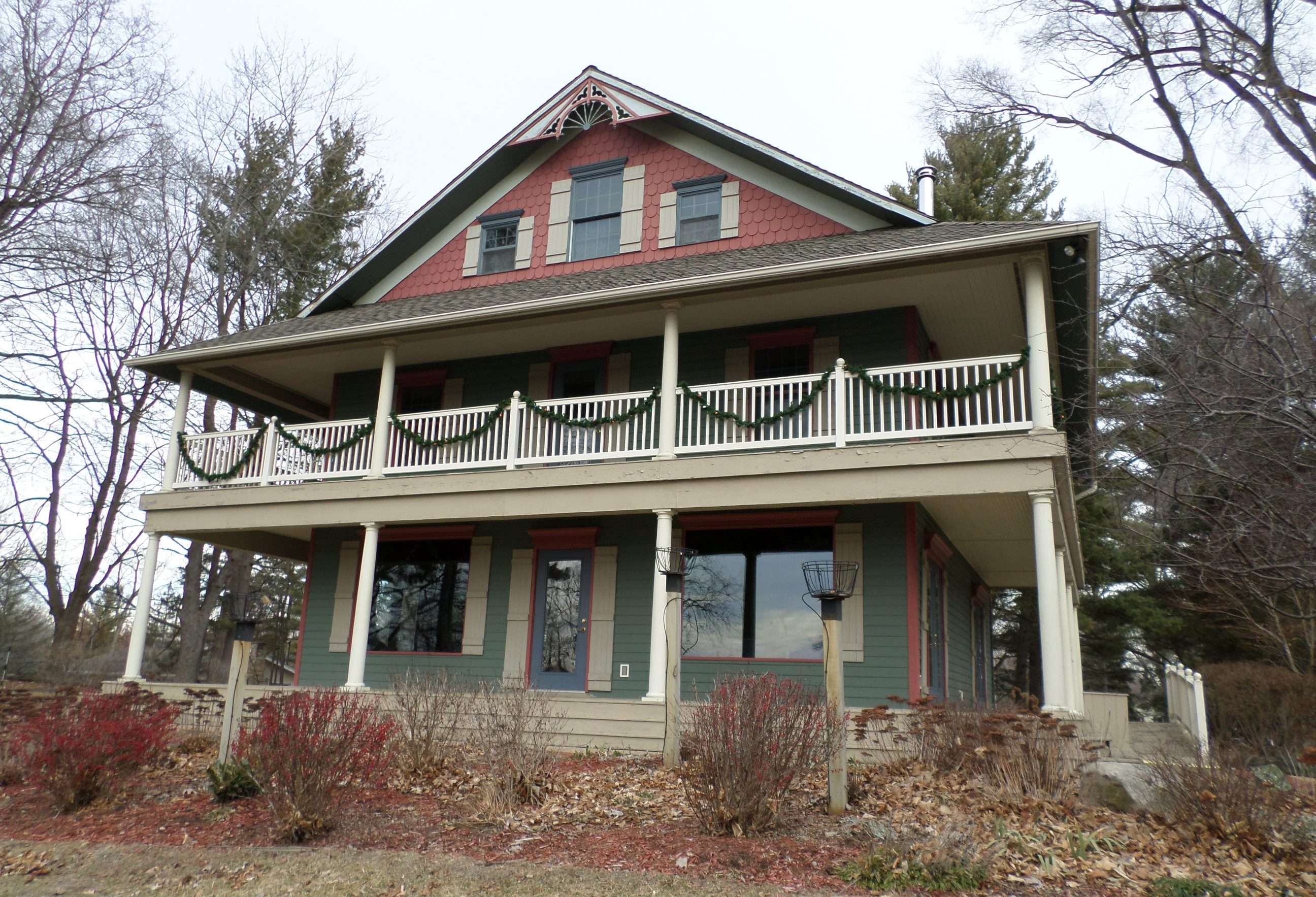
- Interactive map
- Location: 3740 Ocean Beach Rd., Clark Lake, Michigan
- Coordinates: 42°07′25″N 84°18′13″W
- Area: less than one acre
- Built: 1899
- Architectural style: Colonial Revival
- NRHP reference No.: 94000663
- Added to NRHP: July 1, 1994

The Clark Lake Community Center (formerly known as the Kentucky Homestead or the Graziani House) is a public community center located at 3740 Ocean Beach Road in Clark Lake, Michigan. It was originally built as a private house at a different location, and was moved to the present location in 1998. It was listed on the National Register of Historic Places in 1994.

== History ==
In the 1880s, interest in recreational activities was on the rise nationally, and Clark Lake began to be a destination for families from Kentucky, Ohio, and Indiana. This tourist base increased in 1896, when a railroad line was laid through the area, connecting Clark Lake to Jackson and to the rest of the nation. The visitors camped on the shores of the lake, stayed on one of the hotels that had been built in the area, of constricted their own cottages. One of the families which began visiting the area was that of Benjamin Graziani, a well-known lawyer and Kentucky State Senator. The Graziani family first came to Clark Lake in 1896, staying at a small hotel. Graziani decided to build his own cottage, and in 1897 purchased some property on the north side of the lake, at what is now 6740 Kentucky Avenue.

The property already had three small cottages on it, and Graziani constructed an additional large, two-story, frame cottage, which was completed in 1899. He referred to the cottage as the "Kentucky Homestead." The cottage was positioned in such a way as to be prominently visible from different parts of the lake, and became a local landmark. The Grazianis added five more small cottages and began renting them out, helping to develop the area as a vacation spot.

Benjamin Graziani continued to use the cottage until his death in 1923, and his widow, Eliza, summered there until her death in 1933. In 1937, the family rented the cottage to the Clark Lake Yacht Club. After World War II, Laura Graziani Solar, one of Benjamin Graziani's daughters, purchased the cottage. Laura removed the porches that had originally encircled the house. The house remained in the Graziani family until 1986. In 1997, the owners offered the house to the Clark Lake community. It was moved by barge across the lake to the Clark Lake County Park. The house was restored, including the reconstruction of the two-story porches originally included on the house. It opened in 1998 as a community center. The facility is open to the public, and available for rent.

== Description ==
The Clark Lake Community Center is a 2-story, rectangular-shaped cottage with a gable roof. It is three bays wide, and covered with clapboard siding. The roof has asphalt shingles. Corner posts run down the corners of the house, and a frieze board with crown molding runs along the eaves. A two-story, wraparound porch encircles the building. There are four entrances to the cottage: a main central entrance, and three pairs of 15-light French doors: one on one side and two on the opposite. The windows are primarily 1/1 double-hung or single-sash units, with two or three such windows on each floor of all sides of the house.
