= Otsego Apartments =

- Otsego Hotel
- U.S. National Register of Historic Places
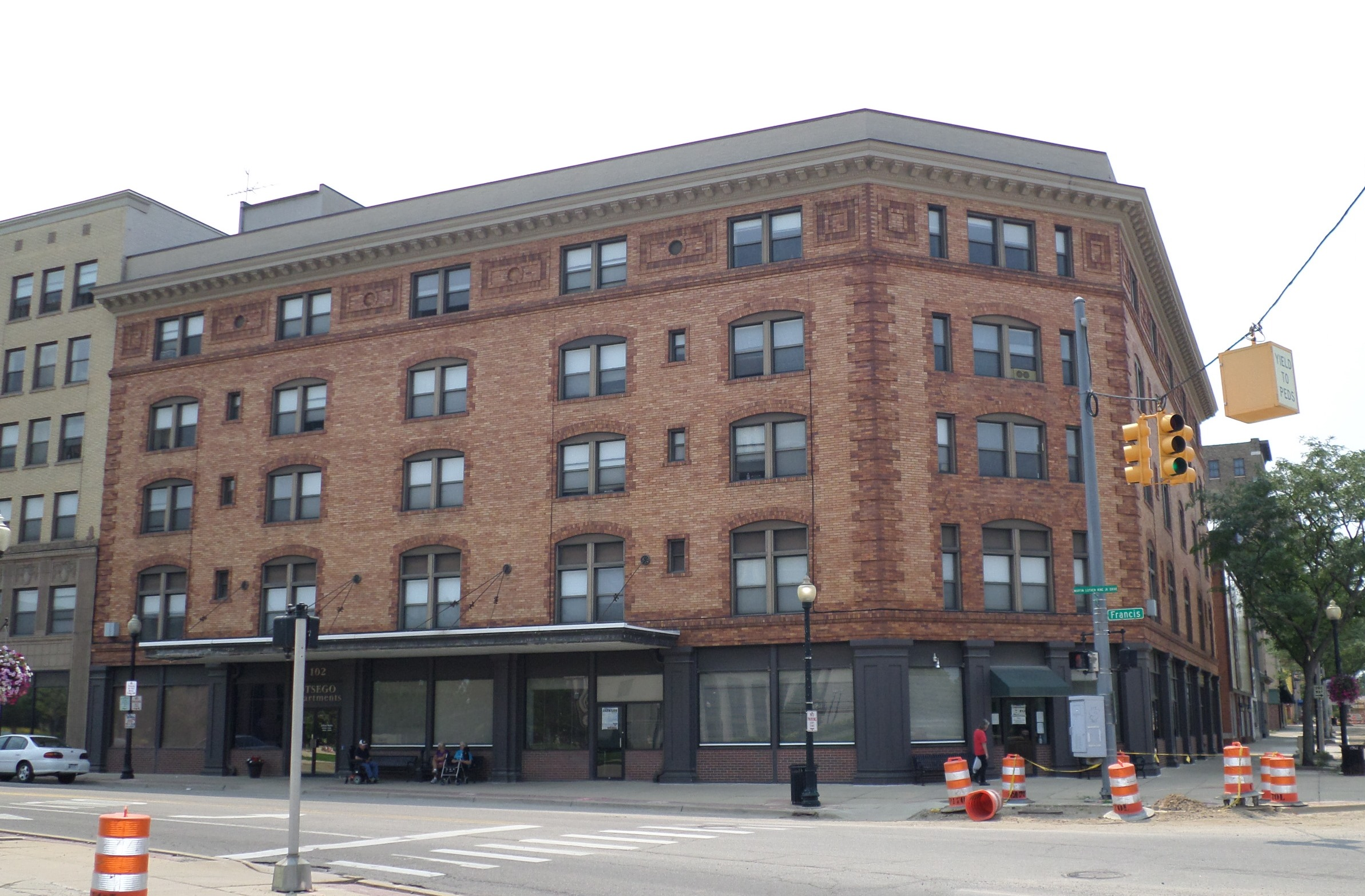

- Location within Michigan
- Interactive map
- Location: 102–106 Francis St., Jackson, Michigan
- Coordinates: 42°14′50″N 84°24′16″W
- Built: 1902
- NRHP reference No.: 15000158
- Added to NRHP: April 20, 2015

The Otsego Apartments, formerly known as the Otsego Hotel is an apartment building located at 102–106 Francis Street in Jackson, Michigan. The building was listed on the National Register of Historic Places in 2015.

== History ==
In 1865, Jackson businessman and stagecoach tycoon Daniel Hibbard constructed an opulent four-story hotel at this location, calling it the Hibbard House. The Hibbard House was later managed by Henry Haden. By the time Haden died in 1899, the Hibbard House was wearing. His heirs closed the hotel and demolished it in 1901. They then invested in constructing a new hotel, starting in 1902. Construction took longer than expected, and the hotel opened in early 1904. They called this new structure the Otsego Hotel, after Haden's birthplace near Otsego Lake, New York. In 1918. the hotel was renovated, and in 1929 a six-story addition was constructed to increase the number of hotel rooms. The hotel operated until 1962, when it closed its doors. In 1972, the building was sold to New Tribes Mission, who converted it into a school for missionaries. The New Tribes Mission stayed in the building for several years, moving out in the late 1970s. The building was converted into federally subsidized housing in 1981. Today it houses senior citizens.

== Description ==
The main section of the Otsego Apartments is a five-story brick structure. A six-story addition is located along Francis Street.
