= Temple Beth Israel Cemetery =

Historic cemetery in Jackson County, Michigan

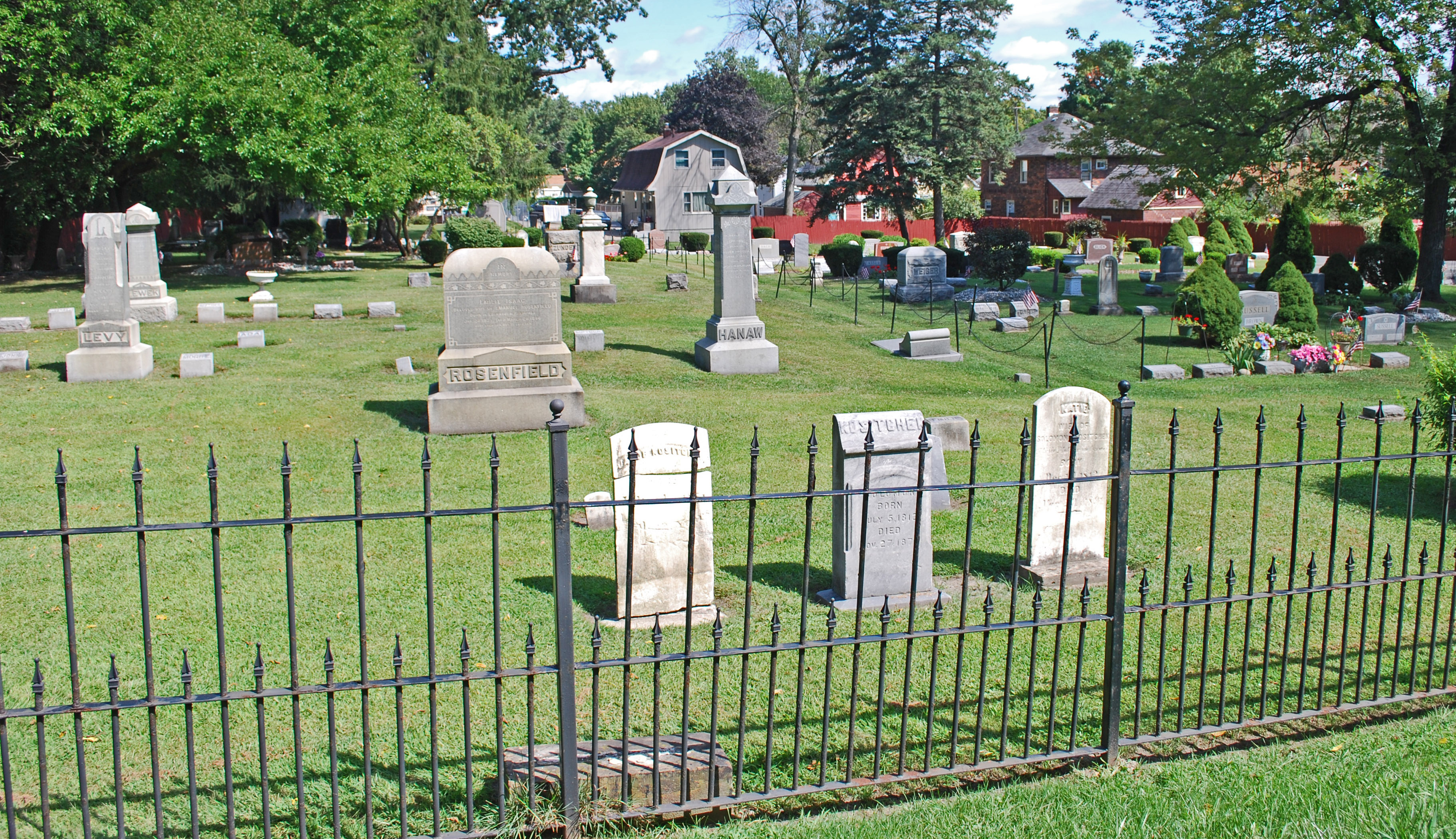
- Interactive map of Temple Beth Israel Cemetery

Details
- Established: 1859
- Location: 420 N. West Ave., Jackson, Michigan
- Coordinates: 42°15′9″N 84°25′24″W
- Type: Jewish cemetery
- Owned by: Temple Beth Israel, Jackson, Michigan
- No. of graves: 274 (as of 2009)
- Find a Grave: Temple Beth Israel Cemetery
- Hebrew Cemetery
- U.S. National Register of Historic Places
- Area: 1 acre (0.40 ha)
- NRHP reference No.: 09000474
- Added to NRHP: June 24, 2009

The Temple Beth Israel Cemetery, also known as the Hebrew Cemetery, is a Jewish cemetery located at 420 North West Avenue in Jackson, Michigan. It was listed on the National Register of Historic Places in 2009. It is owned by Temple Beth Israel, the second-oldest Reform synagogue in Michigan.

== History ==
Early Detroit had a prominent Jewish community, out of which the first Jewish congregation in Michigan, the Temple Beth El, was founded in 1850. Jewish communities gradually moved west, into Ypsilanti, Ann Arbor, and Jackson. The very first Jews in Jackson were Jacob Hirsch and Jacob Levy, who arrived in 1842. Others followed, building up a small community. In 1859, the first burial in what is now the Temple Beth Israel Cemetery took place, of Rosa Hirsch, wife of Jacob Hirsch. It was not until 1860 that the deed was recorded, recognizing ownership of the land, and not until 1861 that the Hebrew Association was formed, for the purpose of maintaining and improving the land.

Jackson's Beth Israel congregation was officially formed in 1862, the second Reform congregation in Michigan. In 1937 ownership and control of the cemetery was transferred to the Temple. In the 21st century, the cemetery remains in use, and is the oldest such Jewish cemetery in Michigan.

== Description ==
The Temple Beth Israel Cemetery is an approximately one-acre plot, now located in an area of mixed commercial and early twentieth-century residential development. A black-painted iron milled post fence runs along the street edge of the cemetery, with chain-link and wooden privacy fences surrounding the other sides. At one corner is a vehicle entrance, marked by a black-painted iron milled post swinging gate between two rock-faced stone pillars. A pedestrian entrance is located on one side of the property. The interior is flat and grass-covered, with a single central formal walkway.

As of 2009, the cemetery contained 274 burials, arranged in rows and divided into family plots. Most of the graves are marked with headstones, nearly all of marble or granite. Markers are typically modest, with little ornamentation. The oldest burials are located in the northwest corner of the cemetery along West Avenue, with the graves becoming newer farther away.

A caretaker's residence is located within at the boundary of the cemetery, fronting the street. It is a two-story vernacular stucco-covered building with a gambrel roof, with an addition at the rear. The original section sits on a rock-faced concrete block foundation. Horizontal and diagonal boards on the exterior mimic half-timbering. The front of the house has a half-hip-roofed porch spanning the first floor, covering one double-hung window and one door; a single double-hung window is on the second floor. Other elevations contain a variety of window forms, including double-hung and fixed lights. The cemetery also contains two small, modern, utility sheds near the house.
