= Old Michigan Avenue School =

- Grass Lake Public School
- U.S. National Register of Historic Places
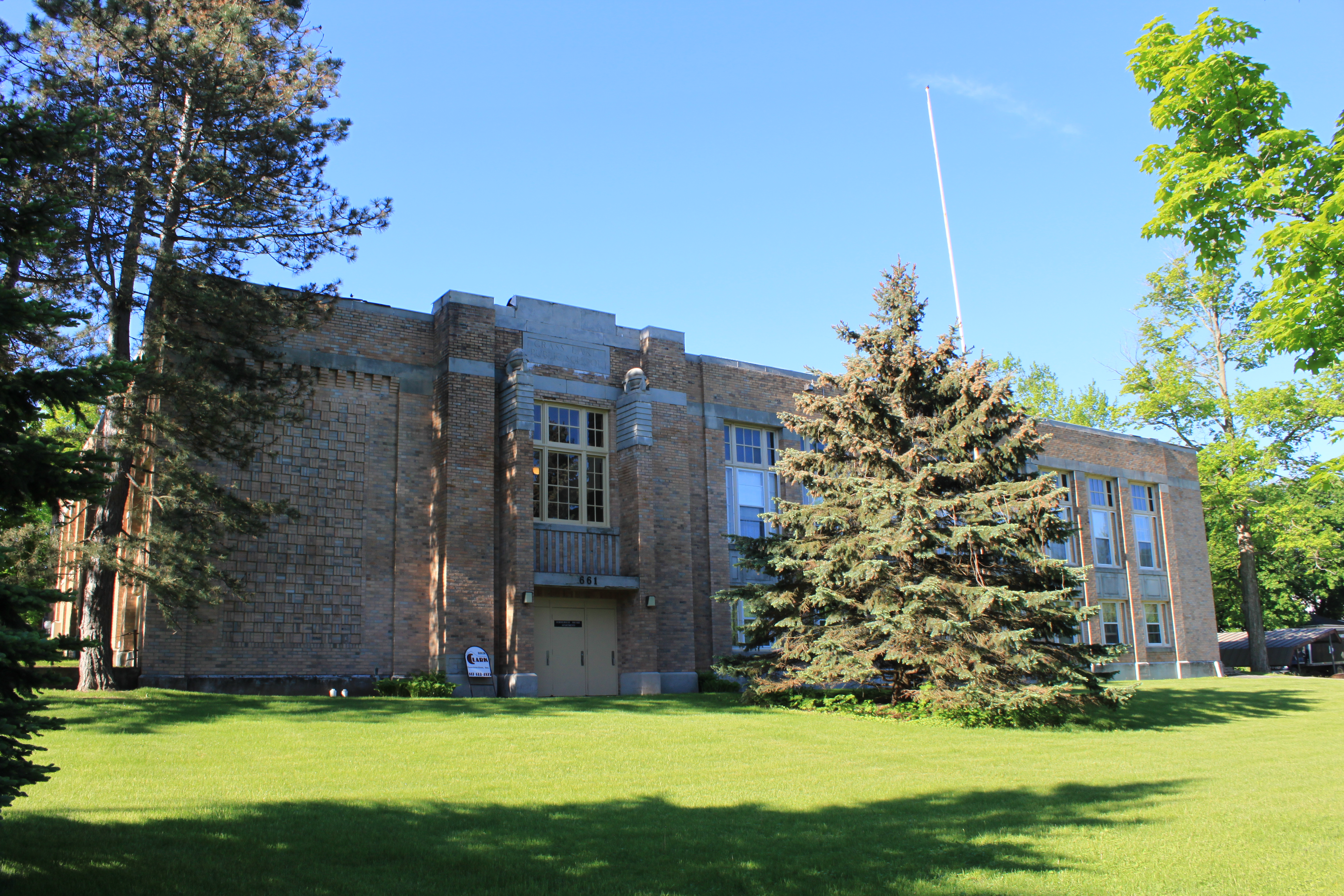
- Interactive map
- Location: 661 E. Michigan Ave., Grass Lake, Michigan
- Coordinates: 42°15′06″N 84°12′16″W
- Area: 2.2 acres (0.89 ha)
- Built: 1927
- Architect: Lane, Davenport & Peterson
- Architectural style: Classical Revival, Modern Eclectic
- NRHP reference No.: 84001693
- Added to NRHP: May 31, 1984

The Old Michigan Avenue School, also known as the Grass Lake Public School or the Schoolhouse Square Apartments, is a former school building located at 661 East Michigan Avenue in Grass Lake, Michigan. It was listed on the National Register of Historic Places in 1984.

== History ==
The village of Grass Lake was founded In 1842, a by-product of the railroad line constructed through the area. In 1863, a school building was constructed for the village, located just south of this building. This was the only area school until the 1920s, when it was determined that more space was needed. The Detroit architectural firm of Lane, Davenport and Peterson was hired to design a new classroom building. Construction began in 1927, and was completed in 1929.

The new building served the lower grades, while the 1863 building continued to serve as a high school. A new high school was constructed in the 1950s, and the older structure was demolished in 1960. The 1927 building was used as a school into the 1980s, when it was converted into apartments.

== Description ==
The Old Michigan Avenue School is a two-story, flat-roofed, steel-frame masonry structure designed in a "Modern Eclectic" Classical Revival style. The main entrance is at the corner of the building, with wings extending in both directions to make an L-shaped footprint. The exterior of the building is clad with orange brick, sitting on a concrete basement. Projecting piers and pylons surround the main entrance. The facade is separated into bays by pilasters. Each bay contains multi-paned, double-hung windows on each level, framed by two vertical multi-paned sidelights A multi-paned tripartite transom unit surmounts the second floor window, and a paneled spandrel separates the first and second floor units. A concrete lintel and brick attic runs across the top of the building.
