= M-50–Sandstone Creek Bridge =

- U.S. National Register of Historic Places
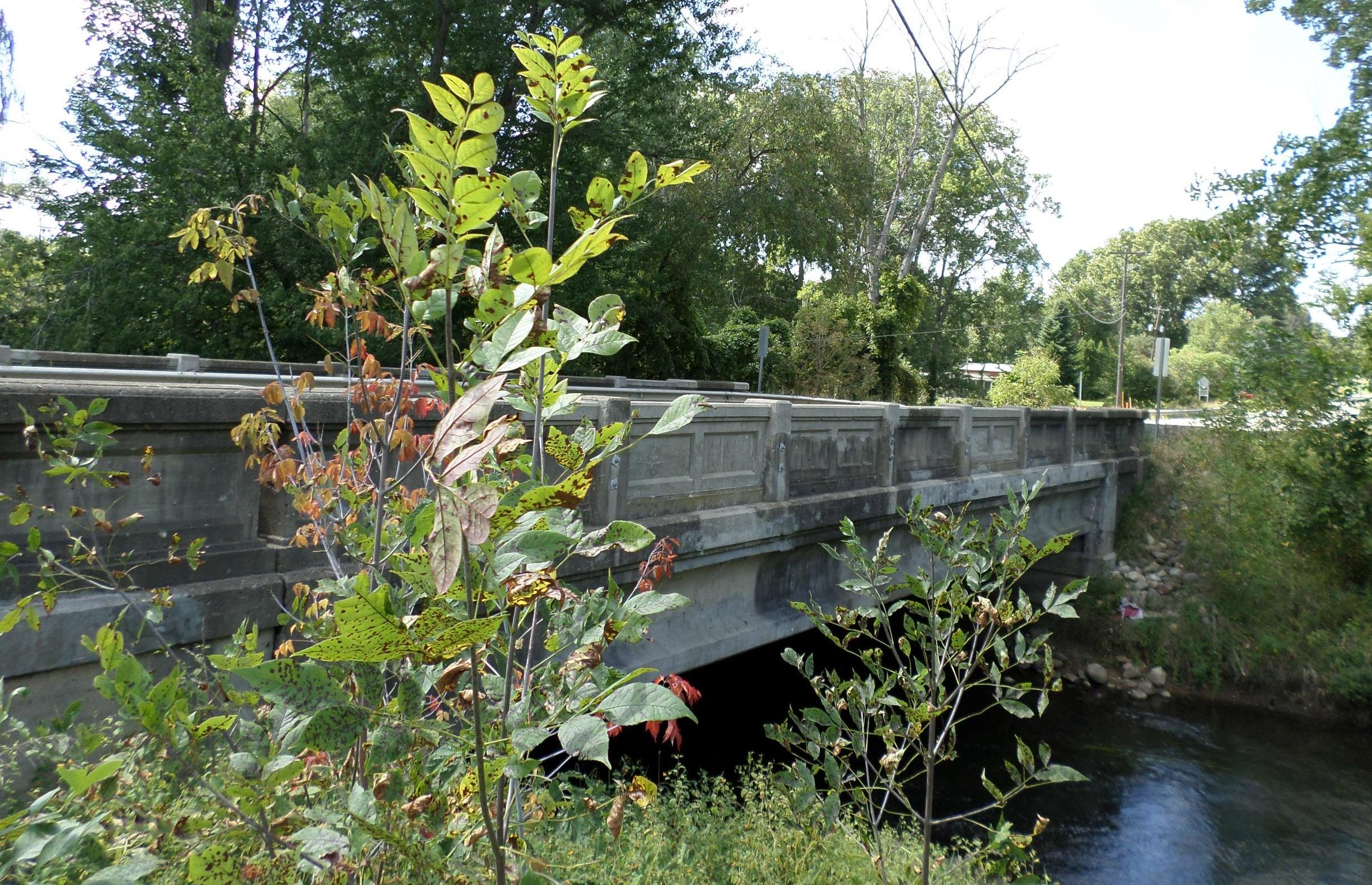
- Interactive map
- Location: M-50 over Sandstone Creek, Tompkins Township, Michigan
- Coordinates: 42°22′23″N 84°32′42″W
- Area: Less than one acre
- Built: 1927
- Built by: W Toebe & Co.
- Architect: Michigan State Highway Department
- Architectural style: Steel deck plate girder
- MPS: Highway Bridges of Michigan MPS
- NRHP reference No.: 99001674
- Added to NRHP: January 14, 2000

The M-50–Sandstone Creek Bridge, also known as th Tompkins Bridge, is a road bridge carrying M-50 over Sandstone Creek in Tompkins Township, Michigan, United States. It was listed on the National Register of Historic Places in 2000.

== History ==
In the early 1900s, what was then Clinton Road followed the route of what is now M-50. The road was incorporated into the Michigan State Trunkline Highway System in the 1910s, with a 62-foot (19 m), pin-connected, Pratt pony truss bridge carrying the road over Sandstone Creek. In the 1920s, this bridge was deemed inadequate, and in 1927 the Michigan State Highway Department contracted with Walter Toebe and Company of Shingleton, Michigan, to construct a replacement bridge. The Wisconsin Bridge and Iron Company of Milwaukee was hired to deliver the structural steel. Modern metal guardrails were later added along the inner faces of the railings, but the bridge still carries traffic along M-50.

== Description ==
The M-50–Sandstone Creek Bridge is a steel deck, plate girder bridge with a 65-foot (20 m) span. It has a 36.4-foot-wide (11.1 m) concrete deck with a two-lane, 30-foot-wide (9.1 m) roadway. The deck is supported by nine concrete-encased plate girders. The bridge has concrete parapet railings, ornamented with recessed panels along the inner and outer faces. Modern metal guardrails are bolted along the inner railing faces. It has a substructure of concrete abutments and wingwalls.
