= Ford Motor Company Brooklyn Plant =

- U.S. National Register of Historic Places
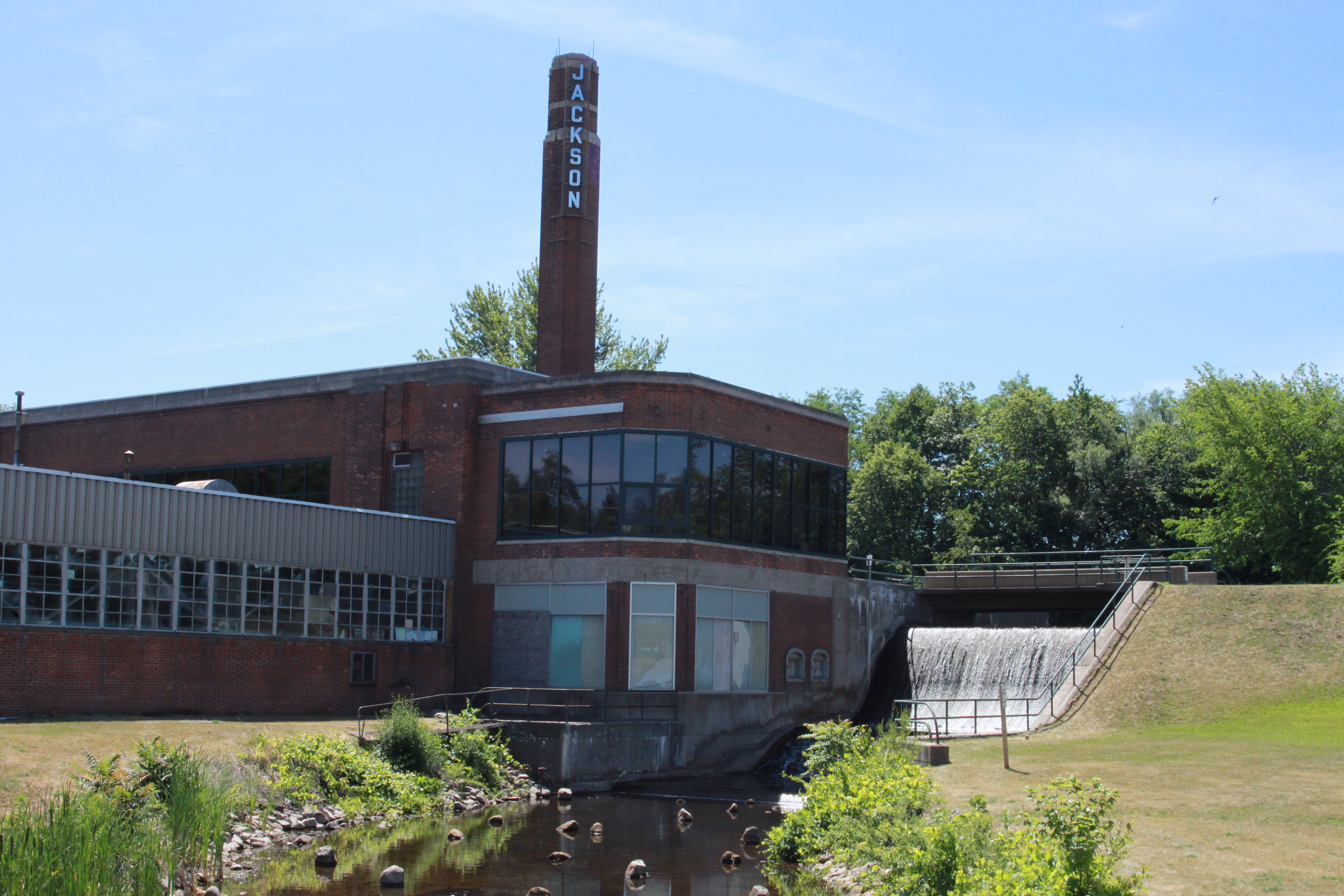
- Interactive map
- Location: 221 Mill St., Brooklyn, Michigan
- Coordinates: 42°06′35″N 84°14′33″W
- Area: less than one acre
- Built: 1938
- Architectural style: Moderne
- NRHP reference No.: 100000532
- Added to NRHP: January 12, 2017

The Ford Motor Company Brooklyn Plant is a former industrial plant once owned by the Ford Motor Company, located at 221 Mill Street in Brooklyn, Michigan. The plant was one of Ford's village industries, which were small factories located in rural areas in southern Michigan. It was listed on the National Register of Historic Places in 2017.

== History ==
In 1832, Calvin Swain purchased the land at this location along the River Raisin. Some time after that, he established a gristmill at the site. The Brooklyn mill burned down in about 1912. Henry Ford purchased the property in 1921, but did not use it for some time. In 1938, he constructed a new building constructed on the site, and the plant opened in 1939. It employed up to 130 people making workers horn buttons and starter switches. During World War II, production shifted to brass spark plug bushings for B-24 bombers. After the war, the line returned to making horn buttons and starter switches until 1954, when production shifted to armrests and lamp lenses.

The Brooklyn site closed in 1967. After it was closed, the building was owned by Industrial Automotive Products, a subsidiary of Jackson Gear. The building has been recently used to house a collector's Model T collection, then housed an alternative fuel research company. The building was purchased by Daniel and Samantha Ross in 2014 and is being converted into an Irish themed destination called the Old Irish Mill. However, funding fell through in 2018.

== Description ==
The Brooklyn plant is a Moderne style red brick plant with large windows.
