= Stone Post Office =

- U.S. National Register of Historic Places
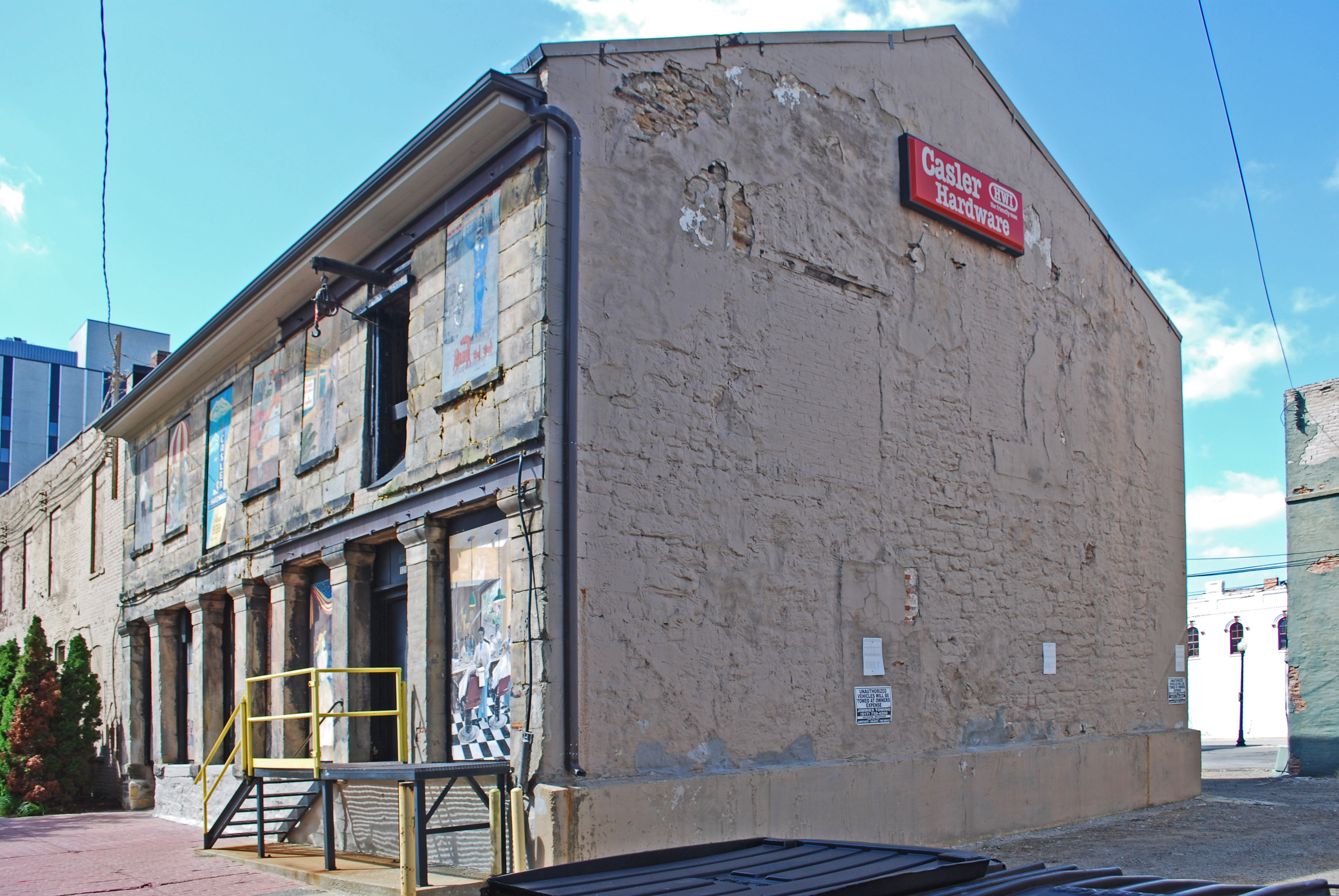

- Location within Michigan Location within the United States
- Interactive map showing the location of the Stone Post Office
- Location: Rear of 125 N. Jackson St., Jackson, Michigan
- Coordinates: 42°14′53″N 84°24′30″W
- Area: less than one acre
- Built: 1839
- Built by: Joseph G.R. Blackwell
- NRHP reference No.: 72000623
- Added to NRHP: March 16, 1972

The Stone Post Office, also known as the Blackwell Building, is a former post office (now used as a portion of a commercial business) located at the rear of 125 North Jackson Street in Jackson, Michigan, United States. It was listed on the National Register of Historic Places in 1972.

== History ==
The first post office in Jackson was located in the log house of Isaiah Bennett, the village's first postmaster. In 1839, Joseph G.R. Blackwell, a wealthy businessman, constructed this stone structure to house his general store, located facing what was then the town's small public square. It was later used to house the town's post office, a use which continued until 1894, By that time, Jackson was large enough to have outgrown the small building, and the Stone Post Office was abandoned in favor of a larger structure built with federal financing. The commercial center of Jackson was also growing, and larger structures were built around the old Stone Post Office, relegating it to the rear of other buildings. Since that time, it has mostly been used as a warehouse for a series of downtown businesses.

== Description ==
The old Stone Post Office is a two-story sandstone structure. Six pillars and two engaged columns are strung across the first floor of what was once the front of the building. The building has nineteen windows, all of which are boarded up. There are five doors, only two of which are currently used. One end of the building is connected to the commercial building fronting the lot.
