= James M. Jameson Farm =

- U.S. National Register of Historic Places
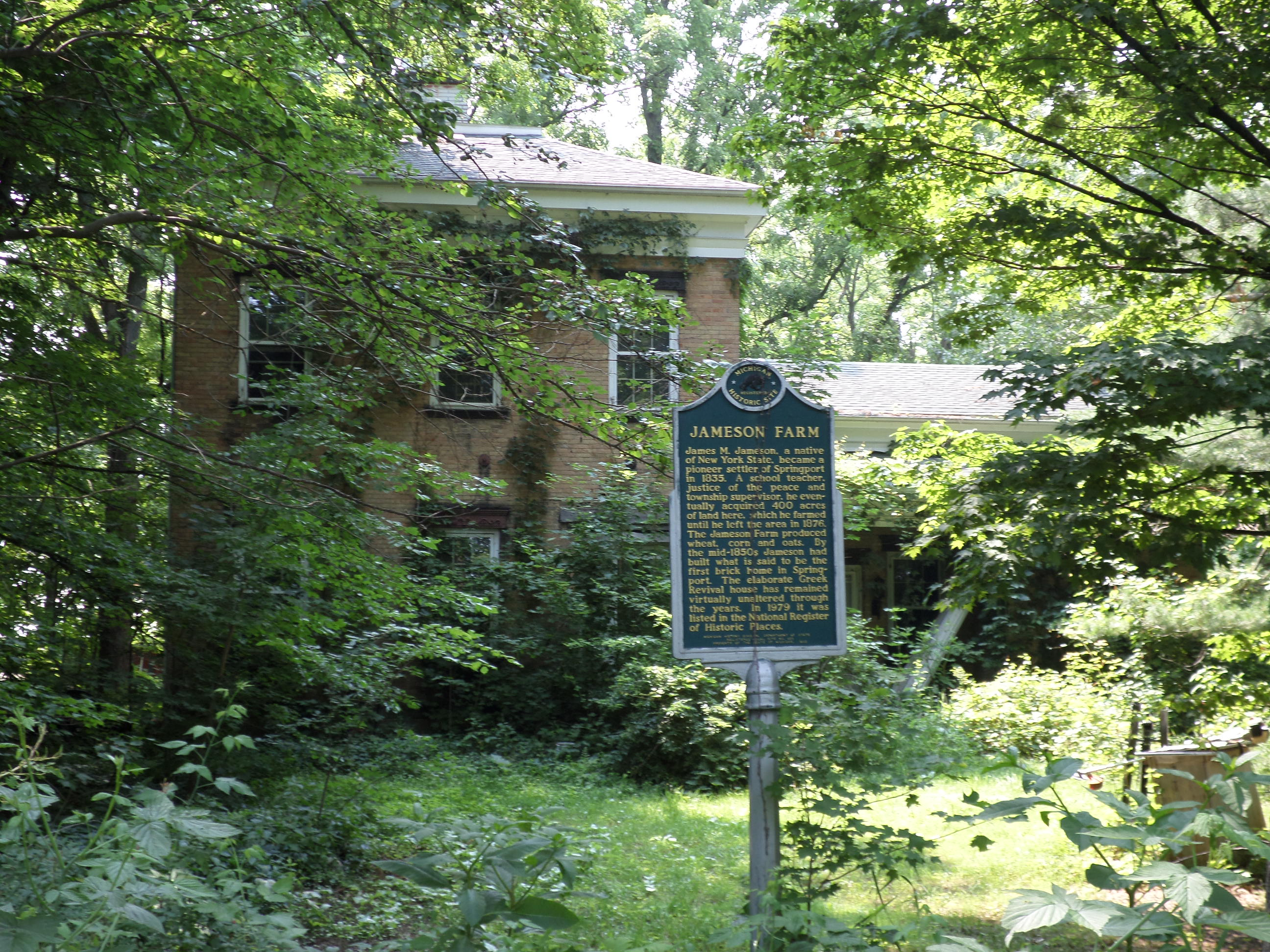
- Interactive map
- Location: 10220 N. Parma Rd., Springport, Michigan
- Coordinates: 42°22′49″N 84°36′02″W
- Area: 4 acres (1.6 ha)
- Built: 1850
- Architectural style: Greek Revival
- NRHP reference No.: 80001875
- Added to NRHP: July 15, 1980

The James M. Jameson Farm is a farmstead located at 10220 North Parma Road near Springport, Michigan. It was listed on the National Register of Historic Places in 1980.

== History ==
James M. Jameson moved from New York State to Springport in 1835. Soon thereafter, he settled on the land on which this house stands and constructed a log house. He began farming, and teaching school in the winter. In 1841, he married Loretta Townley, and began concentrating more on farming. Over the next decade, Jameson built one of the two largest farms in the area, and became a leading local citizen, being elected township supervisor several times. In 1850, Jameson constructed a new brick house. It was the first brick residence built in the township, and the unusually elaborate (for Michigan) house is one of the finest Greek Revival houses in south-central Michigan. Jameson left the Springport area in 1876, and died in Jackson, Michigan, in 1886.

== Description ==
The Jameson Farm includes the 1850 farmhouse along with an old barnyard area containing a barn-corncrib structure, sheep pen, implement shed, and the remains of an orchard. The 1850 farmhouse is an unusually large, elaborate, brick Greek Revival structure built in an L shape. It sits on a fieldstone foundation. The house consists of a two-story main section with a hip roof and a 1-1/2-story, flank-gable, side wing. A large ell extends to the rear. The house has wide cornices with returns and a frieze band below. A porch with Doric columns fronts the wing; a second small porch was formerly located in front of the entry door. The windows are double-hung, six-pane sash units, with iron lintels and sills on the front facade and sandstone lintels and sills on the other facades.
