= Andrew Wilcox House =

- U.S. National Register of Historic Places
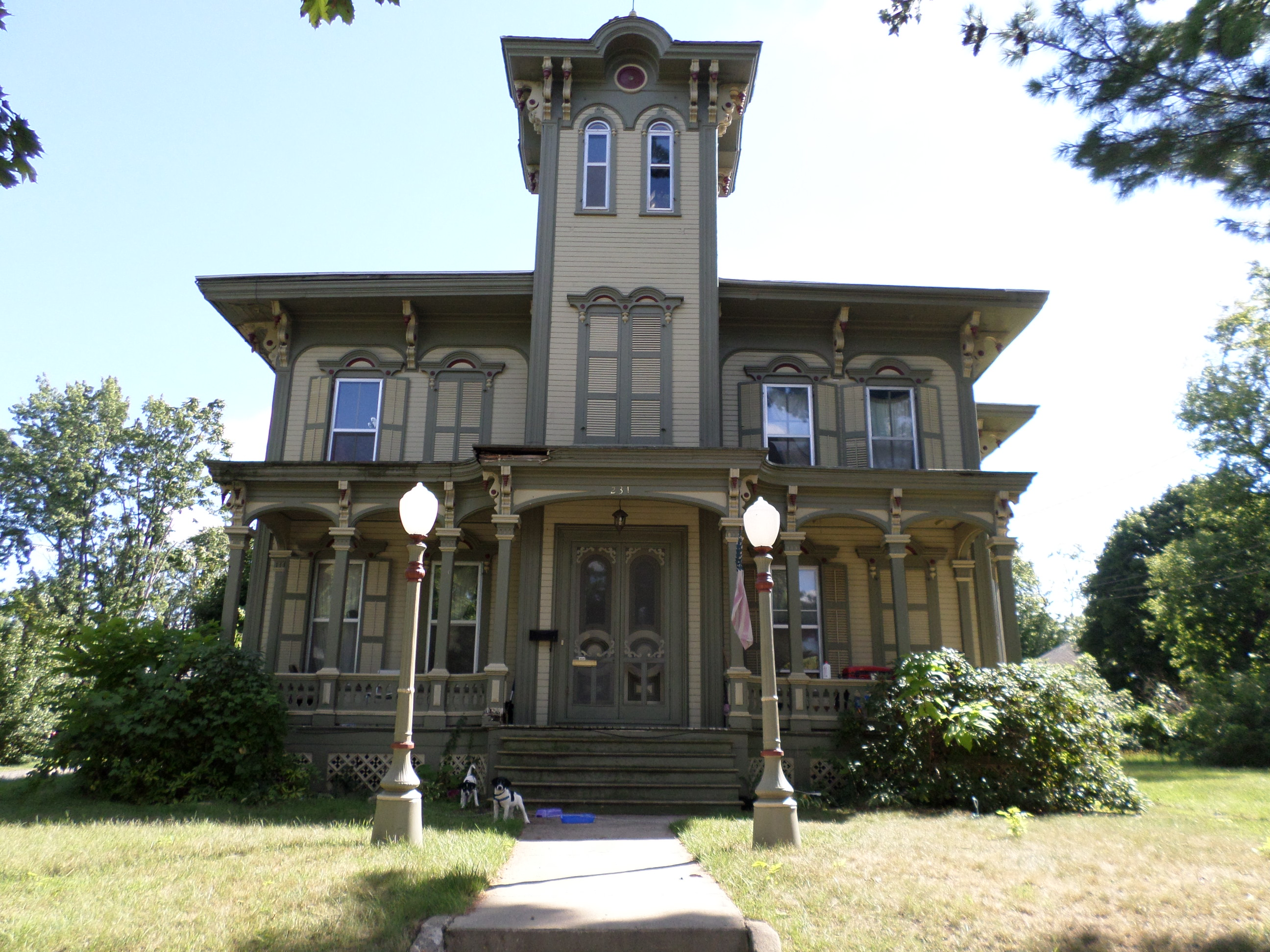

- Location within Michigan Location within the United States
- Interactive map showing the location of Andrew Wilcox House
- Location: 231 E. High St., Jackson, Michigan
- Coordinates: 42°13′57″N 84°23′54″W
- Area: 0.8 acres (0.32 ha)
- Built: 1870
- Architectural style: Italianate
- NRHP reference No.: 87002138
- Added to NRHP: December 14, 1987

The Andrew Wilcox House, also known as the Wilcox-Holton House, is a single-family home located at 231 East High Street in Jackson, Michigan. It was listed on the National Register of Historic Places in 1987.

== History ==
Andrew Wilcox and his brother Homer were partners in A. and H. Wilcox Company, a lumbering, planing mill, and building materials-sales business. The brothers operated a lumbering operation near Cadillac, and in 1870 opened a planing mill in Jackson, Michigan. Andrew Wilcox then constructed this house for his family, completing it in 1871. He likely retired from the business in the early 1880s. Both Andrew Wilcox and his wife died in 1891, and in 1893 George Holton became the owner of the house. Holton ran a foundry and machine shop, and lived in the house until his own death in 1903. The house passed to his wife Ella, and then his son Fred. Fred died in 1933, but his wife Marie continued to live in the house until she moved into a nursing home in 1975.

== Description ==
The Wilcox House is a two-story, T-shaped, frame Italianate structure with a central three-story tower. The house is clad with clapboard, and has corner pilasters. It is capped by a low-pitched hipped roof. It sits on a fieldstone foundation covered with a regular coursing of stone. The windows are single-or double-hung sash units topped by ogee pediments and enclosed in square frames. The front entry doors are in round-head openings, with the other doors in square-head openings. A front fporch runs across the full width of the house, and has chamfered posts and ornamented balusters. Three additional small entry porches are located on different sides of the house.
